= List of birds by common name =

In this list of birds by common name 11,172 extant and recently extinct (since 1500) bird species are recognized. Species marked with a dagger (†) are extinct.

== A ==
- Abbott's babbler
- Abbott's booby
- Abbott's starling
- Abd al-Kuri sparrow
- Abdim's stork
- Aberdare cisticola
- Aberrant bush warbler
- Abert's towhee
- Abyssinian catbird
- Abyssinian crimsonwing
- Abyssinian ground hornbill
- Abyssinian ground thrush
- Abyssinian longclaw
- Abyssinian owl
- Abyssinian roller
- Abyssinian scimitarbill
- Abyssinian slaty flycatcher
- Abyssinian sunbird
- Abyssinian thrush
- Abyssinian wheatear
- Abyssinian white-eye
- Abyssinian woodpecker
- Acacia pied barbet
- Acacia tit
- Acadian flycatcher
- Aceh bulbul
- Acorn woodpecker
- Acre antshrike
- Acre tody-tyrant
- Adamawa turtle dove
- Adelaide's warbler
- Adélie penguin
- Admiralty cicadabird
- Afep pigeon
- Afghan babbler
- Afghan snowfinch
- African barred owlet
- African black duck
- African black swift
- African blue flycatcher
- African blue tit
- African broadbill
- African chaffinch
- African citril
- African collared dove
- African crake
- African cuckoo
- African cuckoo-hawk
- African darter
- African desert warbler
- African dusky flycatcher
- African dwarf kingfisher
- African emerald cuckoo
- African finfoot
- African firefinch
- African fish eagle
- African golden oriole
- African goshawk
- African grass owl
- African green bee-eater
- African green pigeon
- African grey flycatcher
- African grey hornbill
- African grey woodpecker
- African harrier-hawk
- African hawk-eagle
- African hill babbler
- African hobby
- African houbara
- African jacana
- African marsh harrier
- African olive pigeon
- African openbill
- African oystercatcher
- African palm swift
- African paradise flycatcher
- African penguin
- African piculet
- African pied wagtail
- African pipit
- African pitta
- African pygmy goose
- African pygmy kingfisher
- African rail
- African red-eyed bulbul
- African red-rumped swallow
- African river martin
- African rock pipit
- African sacred ibis
- African scops owl
- African shrike-flycatcher
- African silverbill
- African skimmer
- African snipe
- African spoonbill
- African spotted creeper
- African stonechat
- African thrush
- African wattled lapwing
- African wood owl
- African woolly-necked stork
- African yellow warbler
- Agami heron
- Agile tit-tyrant
- †Aguiguan reed warbler
- Ahanta spurfowl
- Ainley's storm petrel
- Akekeʻe
- ʻAkiapōlāʻau
- ʻAkikiki
- ʻAkohekohe
- Akun eagle-owl
- Alagoas antwren
- Alagoas curassow
- †Alagoas foliage-gleaner
- Alagoas tyrannulet
- †Alaotra grebe
- Albert's lyrebird
- Albertine owlet
- Albertine sooty boubou
- †Aldabra brush warbler
- Aldabra drongo
- Aldabra fody
- Alder flycatcher
- Aleutian tern
- Alexandrine parakeet
- Algerian nuthatch
- Allen's gallinule
- Allen's hummingbird
- Allpahuayo antbird
- Alor boobook
- Alor myzomela
- Alpine accentor
- Alpine chough
- Alpine pipit
- Alpine swift
- Alpine thrush
- Alström's warbler
- Alta Floresta antpitta
- Altai accentor
- Altai snowcock
- Altamira oriole
- Altamira yellowthroat
- Amami thrush
- Amami woodcock
- Amani sunbird
- †ʻĀmaui
- Amazilia hummingbird
- Amazon kingfisher
- Amazonian antpitta
- Amazonian antshrike
- Amazonian barred woodcreeper
- Amazonian beardless tyrannulet
- Amazonian black tyrant
- Amazonian black-throated trogon
- Amazonian elaenia
- Amazonian grosbeak
- Amazonian inezia
- Amazonian motmot
- Amazonian plain xenops
- Amazonian pygmy owl
- Amazonian scrub flycatcher
- Amazonian streaked antwren
- Amazonian trogon
- Amazonian umbrellabird
- Amber Mountain rock thrush
- Ambon golden bulbul
- Ambon white-eye
- Amboyna cuckoo-dove
- Amboyna paradise kingfisher
- Ameline swiftlet
- American avocet
- American barn owl
- American bittern
- American black duck
- American black swift
- American bushtit
- American cliff swallow
- American coot
- American crow
- American dipper
- American dusky flycatcher
- American flamingo
- American golden plover
- American goldfinch
- American goshawk
- American gray flycatcher
- American herring gull
- American kestrel
- American oystercatcher
- American pipit
- American pygmy kingfisher
- American redstart
- American robin
- American three-toed woodpecker
- American tree sparrow
- American white ibis
- American white pelican
- American wigeon
- American woodcock
- American yellow warbler
- Amethyst brown dove
- Amethyst sunbird
- Amethyst woodstar
- Amethyst-throated mountaingem
- Amethyst-throated sunangel
- Ampay tapaculo
- Amsterdam albatross
- †Amsterdam wigeon
- Amur falcon
- Amur paradise flycatcher
- Anambra waxbill
- Ancash tapaculo
- Anchieta's barbet
- Anchieta's sunbird
- Ancient antwren
- Ancient murrelet
- Andaman boobook
- Andaman bulbul
- Andaman coucal
- Andaman crake
- Andaman cuckoo-dove
- Andaman cuckooshrike
- Andaman drongo
- Andaman flowerpecker
- Andaman green pigeon
- Andaman masked owl
- Andaman nightjar
- Andaman scops owl
- Andaman serpent eagle
- Andaman shama
- Andaman teal
- Andaman treepie
- Andaman wood pigeon
- Andaman woodpecker
- Andean avocet
- Andean cock-of-the-rock
- Andean condor
- Andean coot
- Andean emerald
- Andean flamingo
- Andean flicker
- Andean goose
- Andean guan
- Andean gull
- Andean hillstar
- Andean ibis
- Andean laniisoma
- Andean lapwing
- Andean motmot
- Andean negrito
- Andean parakeet
- Andean potoo
- Andean pygmy owl
- Andean siskin
- Andean slaty thrush
- Andean solitaire
- Andean swallow
- Andean swift
- Andean teal
- Andean tinamou
- Andean tit-spinetail
- Angola batis
- Angola cave chat
- Angola greenbul
- Angola lark
- Angola slaty flycatcher
- Angola swallow
- Angola waxbill
- Angola white-eye
- Anhinga
- ʻAnianiau
- Anjouan scops owl
- Anjouan sunbird
- Ankober serin
- Anna's hummingbird
- Annam limestone babbler
- Annam prinia
- Annobón white-eye
- Ansorge's greenbul
- Ant-eating chat
- Antarctic petrel
- Antarctic prion
- Antarctic tern
- Anteater chat
- Anthony's nightjar
- Antillean crested hummingbird
- Antillean nighthawk
- Antillean palm swift
- Antillean piculet
- Antillean siskin
- Antioquia bristle tyrant
- Antioquia brushfinch
- Antioquia wren
- Antipodean albatross
- Antipodes kakariki
- ʻApapane
- Apical flycatcher
- Aplomado falcon
- Apo myna
- Apo sunbird
- Apolinar's wren
- Apostlebird
- Appert's tetraka
- Apricot-breasted sunbird
- Apurímac brushfinch
- Apurímac spinetail
- Aquatic warbler
- Arabian babbler
- Arabian bustard
- Arabian eagle-owl
- Arabian golden sparrow
- Arabian golden-winged grosbeak
- Arabian green bee-eater
- Arabian lark
- Arabian partridge
- Arabian scops owl
- Arabian serin
- Arabian sunbird
- Arabian warbler
- Arabian waxbill
- Arabian wheatear
- Arabian woodpecker
- Arafura fantail
- Araguaia spinetail
- Araripe manakin
- Araucaria tit-spinetail
- Archbold's bowerbird
- Archbold's newtonia
- Archbold's nightjar
- Archer's ground robin
- Archer's lark
- Arctic tern
- Arctic warbler
- Arfak astrapia
- Arfak honeyeater
- Aripuana antwren
- Arizona woodpecker
- Armenian gull
- Arnot's chat
- Arrow-marked babbler
- Arrowhead piculet
- Arrowhead warbler
- †Ascension crake
- Ascension frigatebird
- †Ascension night heron
- Ash-breasted antbird
- Ash-breasted sierra finch
- Ash-breasted tit-tyrant
- Ash-browed spinetail
- Ash-colored cuckoo
- Ash-colored tapaculo
- Ash-throated antwren
- Ash-throated casiornis
- Ash-throated crake
- Ash-throated flycatcher
- Ash-throated gnateater
- Ash-winged antwren
- Ashambu laughingthrush
- Ashy bulbul
- Ashy cisticola
- Ashy drongo
- Ashy flowerpecker
- Ashy flycatcher
- Ashy minivet
- Ashy myzomela
- Ashy prinia
- Ashy robin
- Ashy starling
- Ashy storm petrel
- Ashy tailorbird
- Ashy thrush
- Ashy tit
- Ashy wood pigeon
- Ashy woodpecker
- Ashy woodswallow
- Ashy-bellied white-eye
- Ashy-breasted flycatcher
- Ashy-crowned sparrow-lark
- Ashy-faced owl
- Ashy-fronted bulbul
- Ashy-headed babbler
- Ashy-headed goose
- Ashy-headed green pigeon
- Ashy-headed greenlet
- Ashy-headed laughingthrush
- Ashy-headed tyrannulet
- Ashy-tailed swift
- Ashy-throated chlorospingus
- Ashy-throated parrotbill
- Ashy-throated warbler
- Asian barred owlet
- Asian brown flycatcher
- Asian desert warbler
- Asian dowitcher
- Asian emerald cuckoo
- Asian fairy-bluebird
- Asian glossy starling
- Asian golden weaver
- Asian green bee-eater
- Asian houbara
- Asian house martin
- Asian koel
- Asian openbill
- Asian palm swift
- Asian red-eyed bulbul
- Asian rosy finch
- Asian short-toed lark
- Asian stubtail
- Asian woolly-necked stork
- Asir magpie
- Assam laughingthrush
- Atherton scrubwren
- †Atitlán grebe
- Atiu swiftlet
- Atlantic black-throated trogon
- Atlantic canary
- Atlantic petrel
- Atlantic plain xenops
- Atlantic puffin
- Atlantic royal flycatcher
- Atlantic white tern
- Atlantic yellow-nosed albatross
- Atlas pied flycatcher
- Atlas wheatear
- Atoll fruit dove
- Atoll starling
- Atuen antpitta
- Auckland rail
- Auckland shag
- Auckland teal
- Audouin's gull
- Audubon's oriole
- Augur buzzard
- Austen's brown hornbill
- Austral blackbird
- Austral canastero
- Austral negrito
- Austral parakeet
- Austral pygmy owl
- Austral rail
- Austral thrush
- Australasian bittern
- Australasian darter
- Australasian figbird
- Australasian gannet
- Australasian grebe
- Australasian masked owl
- Australasian shoveler
- Australian boobook
- Australian brushturkey
- Australian bustard
- Australian crake
- Australian golden whistler
- Australian hobby
- Australian king parrot
- Australian logrunner
- Australian magpie
- Australian owlet-nightjar
- Australian painted-snipe
- Australian pelican
- Australian pied cormorant
- Australian pipit
- Australian pratincole
- Australian raven
- Australian reed warbler
- Australian ringneck
- Australian rufous fantail
- Australian shelduck
- Australian swiftlet
- Australian tern
- Australian white ibis
- Ayacucho antpitta
- Ayacucho thistletail
- Ayeyarwady broadbill
- Ayeyarwady bulbul
- Ayres's hawk-eagle
- Azara's spinetail
- Azores bullfinch
- Azores chaffinch
- Aztec rail
- Aztec thrush
- Azure dollarbird
- Azure gallinule
- Azure jay
- Azure kingfisher
- Azure tit
- Azure-breasted pitta
- Azure-crested flycatcher
- Azure-crowned hummingbird
- Azure-hooded jay
- Azure-naped jay
- Azure-rumped parrot
- Azure-rumped tanager
- Azure-shouldered tanager
- Azure-winged magpie

== B ==
- Babar myzomela
- Babar whistler
- Babbling starling
- Bacan myzomela
- Bachman's sparrow
- Bachman's warbler
- Baer's pochard
- Baglafecht weaver
- Bagobo babbler
- Bahama mockingbird
- Bahama nuthatch
- Bahama oriole
- Bahama swallow
- Bahama warbler
- Bahama woodstar
- Bahama yellowthroat
- Bahia antwren
- Bahia spinetail
- Bahia tapaculo
- Bahia tyrannulet
- Bahia wagtail-tyrant
- Baikal bush warbler
- Baikal teal
- Baillon's crake
- Baird's flycatcher
- Baird's junco
- Baird's sandpiper
- Baird's sparrow
- Baird's trogon
- Bald eagle
- Bald parrot
- Balearic warbler
- Bali starling
- Balicassiao
- Baliem whistler
- Balsas screech owl
- Baltimore oriole
- Bamboo antshrike
- Bamboo foliage-gleaner
- Bamboo warbler
- Bamboo woodpecker
- Bamenda apalis
- Bananal antbird
- Bananaquit
- Banasura laughingthrush
- Band-backed wren
- Band-bellied crake
- Band-bellied owl
- Band-rumped storm petrel
- Band-rumped swift
- Band-tailed antbird
- Band-tailed antshrike
- Band-tailed antwren
- Band-tailed barbthroat
- Band-tailed cacique
- Band-tailed earthcreeper
- Band-tailed fruiteater
- Band-tailed guan
- Band-tailed hornero
- Band-tailed manakin
- Band-tailed nighthawk
- Band-tailed pigeon
- Band-tailed seedeater
- Band-tailed sierra finch
- Band-winged nightjar
- Banda Islands myzomela
- Banda Sea monarch
- Banda Sea pitta
- Banded antbird
- Banded barbet
- Banded bay cuckoo
- Banded broadbill
- Banded cotinga
- Banded fruit dove
- Banded green sunbird
- Banded ground cuckoo
- Banded honeyeater
- Banded kestrel
- Banded kingfisher
- Banded lapwing
- Banded martin
- Banded parisoma
- Banded prinia
- Banded quail
- Banded stilt
- Banded wattle-eye
- Banded whiteface
- Banded woodpecker
- Banded wren
- Banded yellow robin
- Banggai cicadabird
- Banggai crow
- Banggai fruit dove
- Banggai golden bulbul
- Banggai jungle flycatcher
- Banggai scops owl
- Bangwa forest warbler
- Bank cormorant
- Bank myna
- Bannerman's shearwater
- Bannerman's sunbird
- Bannerman's turaco
- Bannerman's weaver
- Bar-backed partridge
- Bar-bellied cuckooshrike
- Bar-bellied pitta
- Bar-bellied woodcreeper
- Bar-bellied woodpecker
- Bar-breasted firefinch
- Bar-breasted honeyeater
- Bar-breasted piculet
- Bar-crested antshrike
- Bar-headed goose
- Bar-shouldered dove
- Bar-tailed cuckoo-dove
- Bar-tailed godwit
- Bar-tailed lark
- Bar-tailed treecreeper
- Bar-tailed trogon
- Bar-throated apalis
- Bar-throated minla
- Bar-winged flycatcher-shrike
- Bar-winged oriole
- Bar-winged prinia
- †Bar-winged rail
- Bar-winged weaver
- Bar-winged wood wren
- Bar-winged wren-babbler
- Barau's petrel
- Barbados bullfinch
- Barbary partridge
- Barbuda warbler
- Bare-cheeked babbler
- Bare-cheeked trogon
- Bare-crowned antbird
- Bare-eyed antbird
- Bare-eyed myna
- Bare-eyed pigeon
- Bare-eyed rail
- Bare-eyed thrush
- Bare-eyed white-eye
- Bare-faced bulbul
- Bare-faced curassow
- Bare-faced go-away-bird
- Bare-faced ground dove
- Bare-faced ibis
- Bare-headed laughingthrush
- Bare-legged owl
- Bare-legged swiftlet
- Bare-necked fruitcrow
- Bare-necked umbrellabird
- Bare-shanked screech owl
- Bare-throated bellbird
- Bare-throated tiger heron
- Bare-throated whistler
- Barka indigobird
- Barking imperial pigeon
- Barking owl
- Barn swallow
- Barnacle goose
- Barolo shearwater
- Barratt's warbler
- Barred antshrike
- Barred antthrush
- Barred becard
- Barred buttonquail
- Barred cuckoo-dove
- Barred cuckooshrike
- Barred dove
- Barred eagle-owl
- Barred forest falcon
- Barred fruiteater
- Barred hawk
- Barred honey buzzard
- Barred honeyeater
- Barred laughingthrush
- Barred long-tailed cuckoo
- Barred owl
- Barred owlet-nightjar
- Barred parakeet
- Barred puffbird
- Barred rail
- Barred tinamou
- Barred warbler
- Barred wren-warbler
- Barrow's goldeneye
- Bartlett's tinamou
- Barusan bulbul
- Barusan cuckoo-dove
- Basra reed warbler
- Bassian thrush
- Bat falcon
- Bat hawk
- Bateleur
- Bates's nightjar
- Bates's paradise flycatcher
- Bates's sunbird
- Bates's swift
- Bates's weaver
- Baudin's black cockatoo
- Baudo guan
- Baudó oropendola
- Baumann's olive greenbul
- Bay antpitta
- Bay coucal
- Bay hornero
- Bay woodpecker
- Bay wren
- Bay-backed shrike
- Bay-breasted cuckoo
- Bay-breasted warbler
- Bay-capped wren-spinetail
- Bay-chested warbling finch
- Bay-crowned brushfinch
- Bay-headed tanager
- Bay-ringed tyrannulet
- Bay-vented cotinga
- Baya weaver
- Beach kingfisher
- Beach stone-curlew
- Bearded barbet
- Bearded bellbird
- Bearded guan
- Bearded mountaineer
- Bearded reedling
- Bearded screech owl
- Bearded scrub robin
- Bearded tachuri
- Bearded vulture
- Bearded wood partridge
- Bearded woodpecker
- Beaudouin's snake eagle
- Beautiful firetail
- Beautiful fruit dove
- Beautiful jay
- Beautiful nuthatch
- Beautiful sheartail
- Beautiful sibia
- Beautiful sunbird
- Beautiful treerunner
- Beautiful woodpecker
- Beck's petrel
- Bedford's paradise flycatcher
- Bee hummingbird
- Beesley's lark
- Beijing babbler
- Belcher's gull
- Belding's yellowthroat
- Belford's melidectes
- Bell miner
- Bell's sparrow
- Bell's vireo
- Belted flycatcher
- Belted kingfisher
- Bendire's thrasher
- Bengal bush lark
- Bengal florican
- Benguet bush warbler
- Beni greenlet
- Bennett's woodpecker
- Berlepsch's canastero
- Berlepsch's tinamou
- †Bermuda flicker
- †Bermuda hawk
- †Bermuda night heron
- Bermuda petrel
- †Bermuda saw-whet owl
- †Bermuda towhee
- Bernier's teal
- Bernier's vanga
- Berthelot's pipit
- Bertoni's antbird
- Bertram's weaver
- Beryl-spangled tanager
- Berylline hummingbird
- Besra
- Bewick's wren
- Bhutan laughingthrush
- Biak black flycatcher
- Biak coucal
- Biak gerygone
- Biak hooded pitta
- Biak leaf warbler
- Biak lorikeet
- Biak monarch
- Biak myzomela
- Biak paradise kingfisher
- Biak scops owl
- Biak scrubfowl
- Biak triller
- Biak whistler
- Biak white-eye
- Bianchi's warbler
- Bicknell's thrush
- Bicol ground warbler
- Bicolored antbird
- Bicolored antpitta
- Bicolored antvireo
- Bicolored babbler
- Bicolored conebill
- Bicolored flowerpecker
- Bicolored hawk
- Bicolored scrubwren
- Bicolored wren
- Bimaculated lark
- Biscutate swift
- †Bishop's ʻōʻō
- Bismarck black myzomela
- Bismarck cicadabird
- Bismarck crow
- Bismarck fantail
- Bismarck hanging parrot
- Bismarck island thrush
- Bismarck kingfisher
- Bismarck monarch
- Bismarck pitta
- Bismarck whistler
- Bismarck white-eye
- Black antbird
- Black antshrike
- Black baza
- Black bee-eater
- Black berrypecker
- Black bishop
- Black bittern
- Black boubou
- Black bulbul
- Black bushbird
- Black butcherbird
- Black caracara
- Black catbird
- Black cicadabird
- Black coucal
- Black crake
- Black crowned crane
- Black cuckoo
- Black cuckoo-dove
- Black cuckooshrike
- Black curassow
- Black currawong
- Black drongo
- Black eagle
- Black falcon
- Black fantail
- Black flowerpiercer
- Black francolin
- Black grasswren
- Black grouse
- Black guan
- Black guillemot
- Black guineafowl
- Black harrier
- Black hawk-eagle
- Black heron
- Black honey buzzard
- Black honeyeater
- Black hornbill
- Black imperial pigeon
- Black inca
- Black jacobin
- Black kite
- Black lark
- Black laughingthrush
- Black lory
- †Black mamo
- Black manakin
- Black mannikin
- Black metaltail
- Black monarch
- Black noddy
- Black nunbird
- Black oriole
- Black oropendola
- Black oystercatcher
- Black paradise flycatcher
- Black partridge
- Black petrel
- Black phoebe
- Black pitohui
- Black rail
- Black redstart
- Black robin
- Black rosy finch
- Black saw-wing
- Black scimitarbill
- Black scoter
- Black scrub robin
- Black shama
- Black sicklebill
- Black siskin
- Black sittella
- Black skimmer
- Black solitaire
- Black sparrowhawk
- Black spinetail
- Black stilt
- Black stork
- Black storm petrel
- Black sunbird
- Black swan
- Black tern
- Black thicket fantail
- Black thrush
- Black tinamou
- Black turnstone
- Black vulture
- Black wheatear
- Black wood pigeon
- Black woodpecker
- Black-and-buff woodpecker
- Black-and-chestnut eagle
- Black-and-chestnut warbling finch
- Black-and-cinnamon fantail
- Black-and-crimson oriole
- Black-and-gold cotinga
- Black-and-gold tanager
- Black-and-orange flycatcher
- Black-and-red broadbill
- Black-and-rufous swallow
- Black-and-rufous warbling finch
- Black-and-tawny seedeater
- Black-and-white antbird
- Black-and-white becard
- Black-and-white bulbul
- Black-and-white hawk-eagle
- Black-and-white mannikin
- Black-and-white monjita
- Black-and-white owl
- Black-and-white seedeater
- Black-and-white shrike-flycatcher
- Black-and-white tanager
- Black-and-white tody-flycatcher
- Black-and-white triller
- Black-and-white warbler
- Black-and-white-casqued hornbill
- Black-and-yellow broadbill
- Black-and-yellow grosbeak
- Black-and-yellow phainoptila
- Black-and-yellow tanager
- Black-backed antshrike
- Black-backed barbet
- Black-backed bittern
- Black-backed bush tanager
- Black-backed butcherbird
- Black-backed cisticola
- Black-backed dwarf kingfisher
- Black-backed forktail
- Black-backed grosbeak
- Black-backed oriole
- Black-backed puffback
- Black-backed tanager
- Black-backed thornbill
- Black-backed tody-flycatcher
- Black-backed water tyrant
- Black-backed woodpecker
- Black-banded barbet
- Black-banded crake
- Black-banded flycatcher
- Black-banded fruit dove
- Black-banded owl
- Black-banded woodcreeper
- Black-bellied antwren
- Black-bellied bustard
- Black-bellied cuckoo
- Black-bellied cuckooshrike
- Black-bellied firefinch
- Black-bellied gnateater
- Black-bellied hummingbird
- Black-bellied malkoha
- Black-bellied myzomela
- Black-bellied sandgrouse
- Black-bellied seedcracker
- Black-bellied seedeater
- Black-bellied starling
- Black-bellied storm petrel
- Black-bellied sunbird
- Black-bellied tern
- Black-bellied thorntail
- Black-bellied whistling duck
- Black-bellied wren
- Black-belted flowerpecker
- Black-bibbed cicadabird
- Black-bibbed tit
- Black-billed amazon
- Black-billed barbet
- Black-billed brushturkey
- Black-billed capercaillie
- Black-billed cnemoscopus
- Black-billed coucal
- Black-billed cuckoo
- Black-billed flycatcher
- Black-billed gull
- Black-billed hanging parrot
- Black-billed koel
- Black-billed magpie
- Black-billed mountain toucan
- Black-billed nightingale-thrush
- Black-billed peppershrike
- Black-billed scythebill
- Black-billed seed finch
- Black-billed shrike-tyrant
- Black-billed sicklebill
- Black-billed streamertail
- Black-billed thrush
- Black-billed treehunter
- Black-billed turaco
- Black-billed weaver
- Black-billed wood dove
- Black-billed wood hoopoe
- Black-bodied woodpecker
- Black-breasted barbet
- Black-breasted boatbill
- Black-breasted buttonquail
- Black-breasted buzzard
- Black-breasted gnateater
- Black-breasted hillstar
- Black-breasted mannikin
- Black-breasted myzomela
- Black-breasted parrotbill
- Black-breasted puffbird
- Black-breasted puffleg
- Black-breasted thrush
- Black-breasted weaver
- Black-breasted wood quail
- Black-browed albatross
- Black-browed babbler
- Black-browed barbet
- Black-browed bushtit
- Black-browed fulvetta
- Black-browed mountain greenbul
- Black-browed reed warbler
- Black-browed triller
- Black-capped antthrush
- Black-capped antwren
- Black-capped apalis
- Black-capped becard
- Black-capped bulbul
- Black-capped chickadee
- Black-capped donacobius
- Black-capped flycatcher
- Black-capped foliage-gleaner
- Black-capped gnatcatcher
- Black-capped hemispingus
- Black-capped kingfisher
- Black-capped lory
- Black-capped paradise kingfisher
- Black-capped parakeet
- Black-capped petrel
- Black-capped piprites
- Black-capped pygmy tyrant
- Black-capped robin
- Black-capped screech owl
- Black-capped siskin
- Black-capped social weaver
- Black-capped sparrow
- Black-capped speirops
- Black-capped swallow
- Black-capped tanager
- Black-capped tinamou
- Black-capped tyrannulet
- Black-capped vireo
- Black-capped warbling finch
- Black-capped white-eye
- Black-capped woodland warbler
- Black-casqued hornbill
- Black-cheeked ant tanager
- Black-cheeked gnateater
- Black-cheeked lovebird
- Black-cheeked warbler
- Black-cheeked waxbill
- Black-cheeked woodpecker
- Black-chested buzzard-eagle
- Black-chested fruiteater
- Black-chested jay
- Black-chested mountain tanager
- Black-chested prinia
- Black-chested snake eagle
- Black-chested sparrow
- Black-chested tyrant
- Black-chinned antbird
- Black-chinned babbler
- Black-chinned fruit dove
- Black-chinned honeyeater
- Black-chinned hummingbird
- Black-chinned mountain tanager
- Black-chinned robin
- Black-chinned siskin
- Black-chinned sparrow
- Black-chinned weaver
- Black-chinned whistler
- Black-chinned yuhina
- Black-collared apalis
- Black-collared barbet
- Black-collared bulbul
- Black-collared hawk
- Black-collared jay
- Black-collared lovebird
- Black-collared starling
- Black-collared swallow
- Black-cowled oriole
- Black-cowled saltator
- Black-crested antshrike
- Black-crested bulbul
- Black-crested coquette
- Black-crested finch
- Black-crested tit-tyrant
- Black-crested titmouse
- Black-crested warbler
- Black-crowned antpitta
- Black-crowned antshrike
- Black-crowned barwing
- Black-crowned fulvetta
- Black-crowned monjita
- Black-crowned night heron
- Black-crowned palm-tanager
- Black-crowned pitta
- Black-crowned scimitar babbler
- Black-crowned sparrow-lark
- Black-crowned tchagra
- Black-crowned tityra
- Black-crowned waxbill
- Black-crowned white-eye
- Black-eared barbet
- Black-eared catbird
- Black-eared cuckoo
- Black-eared fairy
- Black-eared ground thrush
- Black-eared hemispingus
- Black-eared miner
- Black-eared oriole
- Black-eared seedeater
- Black-eared shrike-babbler
- Black-eared sparrow-lark
- Black-eared warbler
- Black-eared wood quail
- Black-faced antbird
- Black-faced antthrush
- Black-faced babbler
- Black-faced bunting
- Black-faced canary
- Black-faced cormorant
- Black-faced cotinga
- Black-faced coucal
- Black-faced cuckooshrike
- Black-faced dacnis
- Black-faced firefinch
- Black-faced grassquit
- Black-faced grosbeak
- Black-faced hawk
- Black-faced ibis
- Black-faced laughingthrush
- Black-faced monarch
- Black-faced munia
- Black-faced pitta
- Black-faced rufous warbler
- Black-faced sandgrouse
- Black-faced sheathbill
- Black-faced solitaire
- Black-faced spoonbill
- Black-faced tanager
- Black-faced warbler
- Black-faced waxbill
- Black-faced woodswallow
- Black-footed albatross
- Black-fronted brushfinch
- Black-fronted bushshrike
- Black-fronted dotterel
- Black-fronted fig parrot
- Black-fronted flowerpecker
- Black-fronted ground tyrant
- †Black-fronted kakariki
- Black-fronted nunbird
- Black-fronted piping guan
- Black-fronted tern
- Black-fronted tyrannulet
- Black-fronted white-eye
- Black-fronted wood quail
- Black-girdled barbet
- Black-goggled tanager
- Black-headed antbird
- Black-headed apalis
- Black-headed bee-eater
- Black-headed berryeater
- Black-headed brushfinch
- Black-headed bulbul
- Black-headed bunting
- Black-headed canary
- Black-headed cuckooshrike
- Black-headed duck
- Black-headed gonolek
- Black-headed greenfinch
- Black-headed grosbeak
- Black-headed gull
- Black-headed hemispingus
- Black-headed heron
- Black-headed honeyeater
- Black-headed ibis
- Black-headed jay
- Black-headed lapwing
- Black-headed mountain greenbul
- Black-headed myzomela
- Black-headed nightingale-thrush
- Black-headed oriole
- Black-headed parrot
- Black-headed parrotbill
- Black-headed penduline tit
- Black-headed rufous warbler
- Black-headed saltator
- Black-headed shrike-babbler
- Black-headed sibia
- Black-headed siskin
- Black-headed tailorbird
- Black-headed tanager
- Black-headed tody-flycatcher
- Black-headed trogon
- Black-headed waxbill
- Black-headed weaver
- Black-headed whistler
- Black-headed woodpecker
- Black-hooded antshrike
- Black-hooded antthrush
- Black-hooded antwren
- Black-hooded coucal
- Black-hooded laughingthrush
- Black-hooded oriole
- Black-hooded sierra finch
- Black-hooded sunbeam
- Black-hooded tanager
- Black-hooded thrush
- Black-legged dacnis
- Black-legged kittiwake
- Black-legged seriema
- Black-lored babbler
- Black-lored cisticola
- Black-lored parrot
- Black-lored waxbill
- Black-lored yellowthroat
- Black-mantled goshawk
- Black-masked finch
- Black-naped fruit dove
- Black-naped monarch
- Black-naped oriole
- Black-naped tern
- Black-necked aracari
- Black-necked crane
- Black-necked eremomela
- Black-necked grebe
- Black-necked red cotinga
- Black-necked stilt
- Black-necked stork
- Black-necked swan
- Black-necked wattle-eye
- Black-necked weaver
- Black-necked woodpecker
- Black-necklaced honeyeater
- Black-necklaced scimitar babbler
- Black-nest swiftlet
- Black-polled yellowthroat
- Black-ringed white-eye
- Black-rumped buttonquail
- Black-rumped flameback
- Black-rumped magpie
- Black-rumped waxbill
- Black-shouldered cicadabird
- Black-shouldered kite
- Black-sided flowerpecker
- Black-sided robin
- Black-spectacled brushfinch
- Black-spotted barbet
- Black-spotted bare-eye
- Black-streaked puffbird
- Black-streaked scimitar babbler
- Black-striped sparrow
- Black-striped woodcreeper
- Black-tailed antbird
- Black-tailed cisticola
- Black-tailed crake
- Black-tailed gnatcatcher
- Black-tailed godwit
- Black-tailed gull
- Black-tailed leaftosser
- Black-tailed myiobius
- Black-tailed nativehen
- Black-tailed tityra
- Black-tailed trainbearer
- Black-tailed treecreeper
- Black-tailed trogon
- Black-thighed falconet
- Black-thighed grosbeak
- Black-thighed puffleg
- Black-throated accentor
- Black-throated antbird
- Black-throated antshrike
- Black-throated apalis
- Black-throated babbler
- Black-throated barbet
- Black-throated blue warbler
- Black-throated brilliant
- Black-throated bushtit
- Black-throated canary
- Black-throated coucal
- Black-throated finch
- Black-throated flowerpiercer
- Black-throated gray warbler
- Black-throated green warbler
- Black-throated grosbeak
- Black-throated hermit
- Black-throated honeyeater
- Black-throated huet-huet
- Black-throated jay
- Black-throated laughingthrush
- Black-throated loon
- Black-throated magpie-jay
- Black-throated mango
- Black-throated munia
- Black-throated parrotbill
- Black-throated prinia
- Black-throated robin
- Black-throated saltator
- Black-throated shrike-tanager
- Black-throated shrikebill
- Black-throated sparrow
- Black-throated spinetail
- Black-throated sunbird
- Black-throated thistletail
- Black-throated thrush
- Black-throated tody-tyrant
- Black-throated wattle-eye
- Black-throated wren
- Black-throated wren-babbler
- Black-tipped cotinga
- Black-vented oriole
- Black-vented shearwater
- Black-whiskered vireo
- Black-winged cuckooshrike
- Black-winged flycatcher-shrike
- Black-winged ground dove
- Black-winged kite
- Black-winged lapwing
- Black-winged lory
- Black-winged lovebird
- Black-winged monarch
- Black-winged myna
- Black-winged oriole
- Black-winged parrot
- Black-winged petrel
- Black-winged pratincole
- Black-winged red bishop
- Black-winged saltator
- Black-winged snowfinch
- Black-winged stilt
- Blackburnian warbler
- Blackcap babbler
- Blackcap illadopsis
- Blackish antbird
- Blackish chat-tyrant
- Blackish cinclodes
- Blackish cuckooshrike
- Blackish nightjar
- Blackish oystercatcher
- Blackish pewee
- Blackish rail
- Blackish tapaculo
- Blackish-blue seedeater
- Blackish-grey antshrike
- Blackish-headed spinetail
- Blackpoll warbler
- Blacksmith lapwing
- Blacksmith thrush
- Blackstart
- Blackthroat
- Blakiston's fish owl
- Blanford's lark
- Blanford's rosefinch
- Blanford's snowfinch
- Blaze-winged parakeet
- Bleating camaroptera
- Blond-crested woodpecker
- Blood pheasant
- Blood-colored woodpecker
- Blood-eared parakeet
- Blossom-headed parakeet
- Blue bird-of-paradise
- Blue bunting
- Blue cotinga
- Blue coua
- Blue crane
- Blue cuckooshrike
- Blue dacnis
- Blue duck
- Blue eared pheasant
- Blue finch
- Blue grosbeak
- Blue ground dove
- Blue jay
- Blue korhaan
- Blue lorikeet
- Blue malkoha
- Blue manakin
- Blue mockingbird
- Blue Mountain elaenia
- Blue Mountain vireo
- Blue noddy
- Blue nuthatch
- Blue paradise flycatcher
- Blue petrel
- Blue pitta
- Blue quail
- Blue rock thrush
- Blue seedeater
- Blue swallow
- Blue waxbill
- Blue-and-black tanager
- Blue-and-gold tanager
- Blue-and-white flycatcher
- Blue-and-white kingfisher
- Blue-and-white mockingbird
- Blue-and-white swallow
- Blue-and-yellow macaw
- Blue-and-yellow tanager
- Blue-backed conebill
- Blue-backed manakin
- Blue-backed parrot
- Blue-backed tanager
- Blue-banded pitta
- Blue-banded toucanet
- Blue-bearded bee-eater
- Blue-bearded helmetcrest
- Blue-bellied parrot
- Blue-bellied roller
- Blue-billed black tyrant
- Blue-billed curassow
- Blue-billed duck
- Blue-billed malimbe
- Blue-billed teal
- Blue-billed white tern
- Blue-black grassquit
- Blue-black grosbeak
- Blue-black kingfisher
- Blue-breasted bee-eater
- Blue-breasted blue flycatcher
- Blue-breasted fairywren
- Blue-breasted kingfisher
- Blue-browed tanager
- Blue-capped cordon-bleu
- Blue-capped fruit dove
- Blue-capped ifrit
- Blue-capped kingfisher
- Blue-capped manakin
- Blue-capped motmot
- Blue-capped puffleg
- Blue-capped redstart
- Blue-capped rock thrush
- Blue-capped tanager
- Blue-cheeked amazon
- Blue-cheeked bee-eater
- Blue-chested hummingbird
- Blue-chinned sapphire
- Blue-collared parrot
- Blue-crowned chlorophonia
- Blue-crowned hanging parrot
- Blue-crowned laughingthrush
- Blue-crowned lorikeet
- Blue-crowned parakeet
- Blue-crowned racket-tail
- Blue-crowned trogon
- Blue-eared barbet
- Blue-eared kingfisher
- Blue-eared lory
- Blue-eyed cockatoo
- Blue-eyed ground dove
- Blue-faced honeyeater
- Blue-faced malkoha
- Blue-faced parrotfinch
- Blue-faced rail
- Blue-footed booby
- Blue-fronted blue flycatcher
- Blue-fronted fig parrot
- Blue-fronted lancebill
- Blue-fronted lorikeet
- Blue-fronted parrotlet
- Blue-fronted redstart
- Blue-fronted robin
- Blue-gray gnatcatcher
- Blue-gray tanager
- Blue-headed bee-eater
- Blue-headed coucal
- Blue-headed crested flycatcher
- Blue-headed fantail
- Blue-headed hummingbird
- Blue-headed macaw
- Blue-headed parrot
- Blue-headed pitta
- Blue-headed quail-dove
- Blue-headed racket-tail
- Blue-headed sapphire
- Blue-headed sunbird
- Blue-headed vireo
- Blue-headed wood dove
- Blue-lored antbird
- Blue-mantled crested flycatcher
- Blue-mantled thornbill
- Blue-masked leafbird
- Blue-moustached bee-eater
- Blue-naped chlorophonia
- Blue-naped mousebird
- Blue-naped parrot
- Blue-naped pitta
- Blue-necked jacamar
- Blue-necked tanager
- Blue-rumped manakin
- Blue-rumped parrot
- Blue-rumped pitta
- Blue-shouldered robin-chat
- Blue-spotted wood dove
- Blue-streaked lory
- Blue-tailed bee-eater
- Blue-tailed emerald
- Blue-tailed hummingbird
- Blue-throated barbet
- Blue-throated bee-eater
- Blue-throated blue flycatcher
- Blue-throated brown sunbird
- Blue-throated hillstar
- Blue-throated macaw
- Blue-throated motmot
- Blue-throated mountaingem
- Blue-throated piping guan
- Blue-throated roller
- Blue-throated sapphire
- Blue-throated starfrontlet
- Blue-tufted starthroat
- Blue-vented hummingbird
- Blue-wattled bulbul
- Blue-whiskered tanager
- Blue-winged goose
- Blue-winged kookaburra
- Blue-winged laughingthrush
- Blue-winged leafbird
- Blue-winged macaw
- Blue-winged minla
- Blue-winged mountain tanager
- Blue-winged parakeet
- Blue-winged parrot
- Blue-winged pitta
- Blue-winged racket-tail
- Blue-winged teal
- Blue-winged warbler
- Bluethroat
- Bluish flowerpiercer
- Bluish-fronted jacamar
- Bluish-grey saltator
- Bluish-slate antshrike
- Blunt-winged warbler
- Blyth's frogmouth
- Blyth's hawk-eagle
- Blyth's hornbill
- Blyth's kingfisher
- Blyth's leaf warbler
- Blyth's paradise flycatcher
- Blyth's pipit
- Blyth's reed warbler
- Blyth's rosefinch
- Blyth's tragopan
- Boa Nova tapaculo
- Boano monarch
- Boat-billed flycatcher
- Boat-billed heron
- Boat-billed tody-tyrant
- Boat-tailed grackle
- Bob-tailed weaver
- Bobolink
- Bocage's akalat
- Bocage's bushshrike
- Bocage's sunbird
- Bocage's weaver
- Bock's hawk-cuckoo
- Bogotá rail
- Bohemian waxwing
- Böhm's bee-eater
- Böhm's flycatcher
- Böhm's spinetail
- Bokikokiko
- Bokmakierie
- Bold-striped tit-babbler
- Bolivian antpitta
- Bolivian blackbird
- Bolivian brushfinch
- Bolivian earthcreeper
- Bolivian recurvebill
- Bolivian slaty antshrike
- Bolivian spinetail
- Bolivian tapaculo
- Bolivian tyrannulet
- Bolivian warbling finch
- Bolle's pigeon
- Bonaparte's gull
- Bonaparte's nightjar
- Bonaparte's parakeet
- Bonelli's eagle
- †Bonin grosbeak
- Bonin petrel
- †Bonin thrush
- Bonin white-eye
- †Bonin wood pigeon
- Booted eagle
- Booted racket-tail
- Booted warbler
- Boran cisticola
- Boreal chickadee
- Boreal owl
- Bornean banded pitta
- Bornean barbet
- Bornean black magpie
- Bornean black-capped babbler
- Bornean blue flycatcher
- Bornean bristlehead
- Bornean brown barbet
- Bornean bulbul
- Bornean crested fireback
- Bornean crestless fireback
- Bornean forktail
- Bornean frogmouth
- Bornean green magpie
- Bornean ground cuckoo
- Bornean leafbird
- Bornean peacock-pheasant
- Bornean shortwing
- Bornean spiderhunter
- Bornean stubtail
- Bornean swiftlet
- Bornean treepie
- Bornean whistler
- Bornean whistling thrush
- Bornean wren-babbler
- Botha's lark
- Botteri's sparrow
- Boucard's wren
- Bougainville bush warbler
- Bougainville crow
- Bougainville fantail
- Bougainville honeyeater
- Bougainville island thrush
- Bougainville thicketbird
- Bougainville thrush
- Bougainville whistler
- Bougainville white-eye
- Boulder chat
- Boulder finch
- Bounty shag
- Bourke's parrot
- Bower's shrikethrush
- Boyaca antpitta
- Boyd's shearwater
- Boyer's cuckooshrike
- †Brace's emerald
- Bradfield's hornbill
- Bradfield's swift
- Brahminy kite
- Brahminy starling
- Brambling
- Bran-colored flycatcher
- Brandt's cormorant
- Brandt's mountain finch
- Brant goose
- Brasília tapaculo
- Brass's friarbird
- Brassy-breasted tanager
- Braun's bushshrike
- Brazilian laniisoma
- Brazilian merganser
- Brazilian ruby
- Brazilian tanager
- Brazilian teal
- Brazilian tinamou
- Brazza's martin
- Brehm's tiger parrot
- Brewer's blackbird
- Brewer's sparrow
- Bridled honeyeater
- Bridled quail-dove
- Bridled sparrow
- Bridled tern
- Bridled titmouse
- Bridled white-eye
- Bright-rumped attila
- Bright-rumped yellow finch
- Brimstone canary
- Bristle-crowned starling
- Bristle-nosed barbet
- Bristle-thighed curlew
- Bristled grassbird
- Broad-billed fairywren
- Broad-billed flycatcher
- Broad-billed hummingbird
- Broad-billed motmot
- †Broad-billed parrot
- Broad-billed prion
- Broad-billed roller
- Broad-billed sandpiper
- Broad-billed tody
- Broad-billed warbler
- Broad-ringed white-eye
- Broad-tailed grassbird
- Broad-tailed hummingbird
- Broad-tailed paradise whydah
- Broad-tipped hermit
- Broad-winged hawk
- Brolga
- Bronze ground dove
- Bronze mannikin
- Bronze parotia
- Bronze sunbird
- Bronze-brown cowbird
- Bronze-green euphonia
- Bronze-olive pygmy tyrant
- Bronze-tailed comet
- Bronze-tailed plumeleteer
- Bronze-tailed starling
- Bronze-tailed thornbill
- Bronze-winged courser
- Bronze-winged duck
- Bronze-winged jacana
- Bronze-winged parrot
- Bronzed cowbird
- Bronzed drongo
- Bronzy hermit
- Bronzy inca
- Bronzy jacamar
- Brooks's leaf warbler
- Brown accentor
- Brown babbler
- Brown boobook
- Brown booby
- Brown bullfinch
- Brown bush warbler
- Brown cacholote
- Brown crake
- Brown creeper
- Brown cuckoo-dove
- Brown dipper
- Brown eared pheasant
- Brown emutail
- Brown falcon
- Brown firefinch
- Brown fish owl
- Brown fulvetta
- Brown gerygone
- Brown goshawk
- Brown honeyeater
- Brown illadopsis
- Brown inca
- Brown jacamar
- Brown jay
- Brown lory
- Brown mesite
- Brown nightjar
- Brown noddy
- Brown nunlet
- Brown oriole
- Brown parisoma
- Brown parrotbill
- Brown pelican
- Brown prinia
- Brown quail
- Brown rock chat
- Brown scrub robin
- Brown shrike
- Brown sicklebill
- Brown skua
- Brown snake eagle
- Brown songlark
- Brown tanager
- Brown teal
- Brown thornbill
- Brown thrasher
- Brown tinamou
- Brown tit-babbler
- Brown treecreeper
- Brown trembler
- Brown twinspot
- Brown violetear
- Brown wood owl
- Brown wood rail
- Brown woodland warbler
- Brown-and-yellow marshbird
- Brown-backed chat-tyrant
- Brown-backed flowerpecker
- Brown-backed honeybird
- Brown-backed honeyeater
- Brown-backed mockingbird
- Brown-backed needletail
- Brown-backed parrotlet
- Brown-backed scrub robin
- Brown-backed solitaire
- Brown-backed whistler
- Brown-backed woodpecker
- Brown-banded antpitta
- Brown-banded puffbird
- Brown-banded rail
- Brown-bellied stipplethroat
- Brown-bellied swallow
- Brown-billed scythebill
- Brown-breasted bamboo tyrant
- Brown-breasted barbet
- Brown-breasted bulbul
- Brown-breasted flycatcher
- Brown-breasted gerygone
- Brown-breasted kingfisher
- Brown-capped babbler
- Brown-capped fantail
- Brown-capped laughingthrush
- Brown-capped pygmy woodpecker
- Brown-capped rosy finch
- Brown-capped tit-spinetail
- Brown-capped tyrannulet
- Brown-capped vireo
- Brown-capped weaver
- Brown-capped whitestart
- Brown-cheeked bulbul
- Brown-cheeked fulvetta
- Brown-cheeked hornbill
- Brown-cheeked laughingthrush
- Brown-cheeked rail
- Brown-chested alethe
- Brown-chested barbet
- Brown-chested jungle flycatcher
- Brown-chested lapwing
- Brown-chested martin
- Brown-crested flycatcher
- Brown-crowned scimitar babbler
- Brown-crowned tchagra
- Brown-eared bulbul
- Brown-eared woodpecker
- Brown-flanked bush warbler
- Brown-flanked tanager
- Brown-fronted woodpecker
- Brown-headed apalis
- Brown-headed barbet
- Brown-headed cowbird
- Brown-headed crow
- Brown-headed greenlet
- Brown-headed gull
- Brown-headed honeyeater
- Brown-headed jewel-babbler
- Brown-headed nuthatch
- Brown-headed paradise kingfisher
- Brown-headed parrot
- Brown-headed thrush
- Brown-hooded gull
- Brown-hooded kingfisher
- Brown-hooded parrot
- Brown-necked parrot
- Brown-necked raven
- Brown-rumped bunting
- Brown-rumped foliage-gleaner
- Brown-rumped seedeater
- Brown-rumped tapaculo
- Brown-streaked flycatcher
- Brown-tailed rock chat
- Brown-throated barbet
- Brown-throated fulvetta
- Brown-throated martin
- Brown-throated parakeet
- Brown-throated sunbird
- Brown-throated wattle-eye
- Brown-winged kingfisher
- Brown-winged parrotbill
- Brown-winged schiffornis
- Brown-winged starling
- Brown-winged whistling thrush
- Brownish elaenia
- Brownish twistwing
- Brownish-headed antbird
- Brubru
- Bruce's green pigeon
- Brujo flycatcher
- Brush bronzewing
- Brushland tinamou
- Bryan's shearwater
- Bubbling cisticola
- Buckley's forest falcon
- Budgerigar
- Buff-banded mountain tanager
- Buff-banded rail
- Buff-banded thicketbird
- Buff-banded tyrannulet
- Buff-barred warbler
- Buff-bellied hermit
- Buff-bellied hummingbird
- Buff-bellied mannikin
- Buff-bellied monarch
- Buff-bellied puffbird
- Buff-bellied tanager
- Buff-bellied warbler
- Buff-breasted babbler
- Buff-breasted buttonquail
- Buff-breasted earthcreeper
- Buff-breasted flycatcher
- Buff-breasted paradise kingfisher
- Buff-breasted sabrewing
- Buff-breasted sandpiper
- Buff-breasted tody-tyrant
- Buff-breasted wheatear
- Buff-breasted wren
- Buff-bridled Inca finch
- Buff-browed chachalaca
- Buff-browed foliage-gleaner
- Buff-cheeked greenlet
- Buff-cheeked tody-flycatcher
- Buff-collared nightjar
- Buff-crested bustard
- Buff-faced pygmy parrot
- Buff-faced scrubwren
- Buff-fronted foliage-gleaner
- Buff-fronted owl
- Buff-fronted quail-dove
- Buff-headed coucal
- Buff-necked ibis
- Buff-necked woodpecker
- Buff-rumped thornbill
- Buff-rumped warbler
- Buff-rumped woodpecker
- Buff-sided robin
- Buff-spotted flameback
- Buff-spotted flufftail
- Buff-spotted woodpecker
- Buff-streaked chat
- Buff-tailed coronet
- Buff-tailed sicklebill
- Buff-thighed puffleg
- Buff-throated apalis
- Buff-throated monal-partridge
- Buff-throated purpletuft
- Buff-throated saltator
- Buff-throated sunbird
- Buff-throated tody-tyrant
- Buff-throated warbler
- Buff-throated warbling finch
- Buff-throated woodcreeper
- Buff-vented bulbul
- Buff-winged cinclodes
- Buff-winged starfrontlet
- Bufflehead
- Buffy fish owl
- Buffy helmetcrest
- Buffy hummingbird
- Buffy laughingthrush
- Buffy pipit
- Buffy tuftedcheek
- Buffy-crowned wood partridge
- Buffy-fronted seedeater
- Bugun liocichla
- Bukidnon woodcock
- Bull-headed shrike
- Buller's albatross
- Buller's shearwater
- Bullock's oriole
- Bulwer's petrel
- Bulwer's pheasant
- Bumblebee hummingbird
- Bundok flycatcher
- Burchell's coucal
- Burchell's courser
- Burchell's sandgrouse
- Burchell's starling
- Burmese bush lark
- Burmese collared dove
- Burmese myna
- Burmese nuthatch
- Burmese prinia
- Burmese shrike
- Burmese yuhina
- Burnished-buff tanager
- Burnt-necked eremomela
- Burrowing owl
- Burrowing parrot
- Buru boobook
- Buru bush warbler
- Buru cuckooshrike
- Buru dwarf kingfisher
- Buru flowerpecker
- Buru friarbird
- Buru golden bulbul
- Buru green pigeon
- Buru honeyeater
- Buru jungle flycatcher
- Buru monarch
- Buru mountain pigeon
- Buru racket-tail
- Buru thrush
- Buru white-eye
- Bush blackcap
- Bush stone-curlew
- Bushveld pipit
- †Bushwren
- Bushy-crested hornbill
- Bushy-crested jay
- Butterfly coquette
- Buzzing flowerpecker

== C ==
- Caatinga antwren
- Caatinga cacholote
- Caatinga parakeet
- Cabanis's bunting
- Cabanis's greenbul
- Cabanis's ground sparrow
- Cabanis's spinetail
- Cabanis's wren
- Cabot's tragopan
- Cachar bulbul
- Cachar wedge-billed babbler
- Cackling goose
- Cactus canastero
- Cactus wren
- Caica parrot
- Cajamarca antpitta
- Calabarzon babbler
- Calandra lark
- Calayan rail
- California condor
- California gnatcatcher
- California gull
- California quail
- California scrub jay
- California thrasher
- California towhee
- Calliope hummingbird
- Cambodian flowerpecker
- Cambodian laughingthrush
- Cambodian tailorbird
- Cameroon indigobird
- Cameroon mountain greenbul
- Cameroon olive greenbul
- Cameroon olive pigeon
- Cameroon sunbird
- Camiguin boobook
- Camiguin bulbul
- Camiguin hanging parrot
- Campbell shag
- Campbell teal
- Campbell's fairywren
- Campina thrush
- Campo flicker
- Campo miner
- Campo troupial
- Canada goose
- Canada jay
- Canada warbler
- Canary flyrobin
- Canary Islands chaffinch
- Canary Islands chiffchaff
- †Canary Islands oystercatcher
- Canary Islands robin
- Canary Islands stonechat
- Canary white-eye
- Canebrake groundcreeper
- Canebrake wren
- Canivet's emerald
- Canvasback
- Canyon canastero
- Canyon towhee
- Canyon wren
- Cape Barren goose
- Cape batis
- Cape bulbul
- Cape bunting
- Cape canary
- Cape clapper lark
- Cape cormorant
- Cape crow
- Cape eagle-owl
- Cape gannet
- Cape grassbird
- Cape long-billed lark
- Cape longclaw
- Cape May warbler
- Cape parrot
- Cape penduline tit
- Cape robin-chat
- Cape rock thrush
- Cape rockjumper
- Cape shoveler
- Cape siskin
- Cape sparrow
- Cape spurfowl
- Cape starling
- Cape sugarbird
- Cape teal
- Cape Verde petrel
- Cape Verde shearwater
- Cape Verde storm petrel
- Cape Verde swift
- Cape Verde warbler
- Cape vulture
- Cape wagtail
- Cape weaver
- Cape white-eye
- Capped conebill
- Capped heron
- Capped wheatear
- Capped white-eye
- Capuchin babbler
- Capuchinbird
- Caracas brushfinch
- Caracas tapaculo
- Carbonated sierra finch
- Cardinal lory
- Cardinal myzomela
- Cardinal quelea
- Cardinal woodpecker
- Carib grackle
- Caribbean dove
- Caribbean elaenia
- Caribbean hornero
- Caribbean martin
- Carmelite sunbird
- Carmiol's tanager
- Carnaby's black cockatoo
- Carolina chickadee
- †Carolina parakeet
- Carolina wren
- Caroline reed warbler
- Caroline swiftlet
- Carp's tit
- Carpentarian grasswren
- Carriker's mountain tanager
- Carrion crow
- Carrizal seedeater
- Carruthers's cisticola
- Carunculated caracara
- Carunculated fruit dove
- Caspian gull
- Caspian plover
- Caspian snowcock
- Caspian tern
- Caspian tit
- Casqued cacique
- Cassia crossbill
- Cassin's auklet
- Cassin's finch
- Cassin's flycatcher
- Cassin's hawk-eagle
- Cassin's honeybird
- Cassin's kingbird
- Cassin's malimbe
- Cassin's sparrow
- Cassin's spinetail
- Cassin's vireo
- Castelnau's antshrike
- Cattle tyrant
- Cauca beardless tyrannulet
- Cauca guan
- Caucasian grouse
- Caucasian snowcock
- Caura antbird
- Cave swallow
- Cayenne jay
- Cayenne nightjar
- Ceará gnateater
- Ceara woodcreeper
- Cebu boobook
- Cebu flowerpecker
- Cedar waxwing
- Celestial monarch
- Central American pygmy owl
- Central Melanesian cicadabird
- Cerulean cuckooshrike
- Cerulean flycatcher
- Cerulean kingfisher
- Cerulean warbler
- Cerulean-capped manakin
- Cetti's warbler
- Chabert vanga
- Chachapoyas antpitta
- Chaco chachalaca
- Chaco eagle
- Chaco earthcreeper
- Chaco owl
- Chaco sparrow
- Chad firefinch
- Chalk-browed mockingbird
- Chami antpitta
- Changeable hawk-eagle
- Channel-billed cuckoo
- Channel-billed toucan
- Chapada flycatcher
- Chapin's apalis
- Chapin's babbler
- Chapin's flycatcher
- Chaplin's barbet
- Chapman's antshrike
- Chapman's bristle tyrant
- Chapman's swift
- Charlotte's bulbul
- Charming hummingbird
- Chat flycatcher
- Chatham albatross
- †Chatham Islands bellbird
- †Chatham Islands fernbird
- Chatham Islands gerygone
- Chatham Islands kakariki
- Chatham Islands oystercatcher
- Chatham Islands petrel
- Chatham Islands pigeon
- Chatham Islands snipe
- †Chatham rail
- Chatham shag
- Chattering cisticola
- Chattering gnatwren
- Chattering kingfisher
- Chattering lory
- Checker-throated stipplethroat
- Checker-throated woodpecker
- Checkered woodpecker
- Cheer pheasant
- Cheerful fantail
- Cherrie's antwren
- Cherry-throated tanager
- Chestnut antpitta
- Chestnut bulbul
- Chestnut bunting
- Chestnut forest rail
- Chestnut munia
- Chestnut piculet
- Chestnut quail-thrush
- Chestnut rail
- Chestnut seedeater
- Chestnut sparrow
- Chestnut teal
- Chestnut thrush
- Chestnut wattle-eye
- Chestnut weaver
- Chestnut wood quail
- Chestnut woodpecker
- Chestnut-and-black weaver
- Chestnut-backed antbird
- Chestnut-backed antshrike
- Chestnut-backed buttonquail
- Chestnut-backed chickadee
- Chestnut-backed jewel-babbler
- Chestnut-backed laughingthrush
- Chestnut-backed owlet
- Chestnut-backed sparrow-lark
- Chestnut-backed sparrow-weaver
- Chestnut-backed tanager
- Chestnut-backed thornbird
- Chestnut-backed thrush
- Chestnut-banded plover
- Chestnut-bellied cotinga
- Chestnut-bellied cuckoo
- Chestnut-bellied euphonia
- Chestnut-bellied fantail
- Chestnut-bellied flowerpiercer
- Chestnut-bellied guan
- Chestnut-bellied hummingbird
- Chestnut-bellied imperial pigeon
- Chestnut-bellied malkoha
- Chestnut-bellied monarch
- Chestnut-bellied mountain tanager
- Chestnut-bellied nuthatch
- Chestnut-bellied partridge
- Chestnut-bellied rock thrush
- Chestnut-bellied sandgrouse
- Chestnut-bellied seed finch
- Chestnut-bellied seedeater
- Chestnut-bellied starling
- Chestnut-bellied thrush
- Chestnut-bellied tit
- Chestnut-belted gnateater
- Chestnut-breasted chlorophonia
- Chestnut-breasted coronet
- Chestnut-breasted cuckoo
- Chestnut-breasted malkoha
- Chestnut-breasted mannikin
- Chestnut-breasted mountain finch
- Chestnut-breasted nigrita
- Chestnut-breasted partridge
- Chestnut-breasted quail-thrush
- Chestnut-breasted whiteface
- Chestnut-capped babbler
- Chestnut-capped blackbird
- Chestnut-capped brushfinch
- Chestnut-capped flycatcher
- Chestnut-capped laughingthrush
- Chestnut-capped piha
- Chestnut-capped puffbird
- Chestnut-capped thrush
- Chestnut-capped warbler
- Chestnut-cheeked starling
- Chestnut-collared longspur
- Chestnut-collared swallow
- Chestnut-collared swift
- Chestnut-colored woodpecker
- Chestnut-crested antbird
- Chestnut-crested cotinga
- Chestnut-crested yuhina
- Chestnut-crowned antpitta
- Chestnut-crowned babbler
- Chestnut-crowned becard
- Chestnut-crowned bush warbler
- Chestnut-crowned foliage-gleaner
- Chestnut-crowned gnateater
- Chestnut-crowned laughingthrush
- Chestnut-crowned sparrow-weaver
- Chestnut-crowned warbler
- Chestnut-eared aracari
- Chestnut-eared bunting
- Chestnut-eared laughingthrush
- Chestnut-faced babbler
- Chestnut-flanked sparrowhawk
- Chestnut-flanked white-eye
- Chestnut-fronted helmetshrike
- Chestnut-fronted macaw
- Chestnut-headed bee-eater
- Chestnut-headed chachalaca
- Chestnut-headed crake
- Chestnut-headed flufftail
- Chestnut-headed nunlet
- Chestnut-headed oropendola
- Chestnut-headed partridge
- Chestnut-headed sparrow-lark
- Chestnut-headed tanager
- Chestnut-headed tesia
- Chestnut-hooded laughingthrush
- Chestnut-naped antpitta
- Chestnut-naped forktail
- Chestnut-naped spurfowl
- Chestnut-necklaced partridge
- Chestnut-quilled rock pigeon
- Chestnut-rumped babbler
- Chestnut-rumped heathwren
- Chestnut-rumped thornbill
- Chestnut-rumped woodcreeper
- Chestnut-shouldered antwren
- Chestnut-shouldered goshawk
- Chestnut-sided shrike-vireo
- Chestnut-sided warbler
- Chestnut-tailed starling
- Chestnut-throated apalis
- Chestnut-throated flycatcher
- Chestnut-throated huet-huet
- Chestnut-throated monal-partridge
- Chestnut-throated seedeater
- Chestnut-throated spinetail
- Chestnut-tipped toucanet
- Chestnut-vented conebill
- Chestnut-vented nuthatch
- Chestnut-vented warbler
- Chestnut-winged babbler
- Chestnut-winged chachalaca
- Chestnut-winged cinclodes
- Chestnut-winged cuckoo
- Chestnut-winged foliage-gleaner
- Chestnut-winged hookbill
- Chestnut-winged starling
- Chico's tyrannulet
- Chiguanco thrush
- Chihuahuan meadowlark
- Chihuahuan raven
- Chilean flamingo
- Chilean flicker
- Chilean hawk
- Chilean mockingbird
- Chilean pigeon
- Chilean seaside cinclodes
- Chilean skua
- Chilean swallow
- Chilean tinamou
- Chilean woodstar
- Chiloé wigeon
- Chimango caracara
- Chiming wedgebill
- Chimney swift
- Chin Hills wren-babbler
- Chinchipe spinetail
- Chinese babax
- Chinese bamboo partridge
- Chinese barbet
- Chinese beautiful rosefinch
- Chinese blackbird
- Chinese blue flycatcher
- Chinese bush warbler
- Chinese crested tern
- Chinese egret
- Chinese francolin
- Chinese fulvetta
- Chinese grassbird
- Chinese grey shrike
- Chinese grosbeak
- Chinese grouse
- Chinese hwamei
- Chinese leaf warbler
- Chinese monal
- Chinese nuthatch
- Chinese penduline tit
- Chinese pond heron
- Chinese rubythroat
- Chinese shortwing
- Chinese sparrowhawk
- Chinese thrush
- Chinese vivid niltava
- Chinese whistling thrush
- Chinese white-browed rosefinch
- Chinspot batis
- Chinstrap penguin
- Chipping sparrow
- Chiribiquete emerald
- Chirinda apalis
- Chiriqui foliage-gleaner
- Chiriqui quail-dove
- Chirping cisticola
- Chirruping nightjar
- Chirruping wedgebill
- Chivi vireo
- Choco black-throated trogon
- Choco brushfinch
- Choco elaenia
- Choco manakin
- Chocó poorwill
- Chocó screech owl
- Choco sirystes
- Chocó tapaculo
- Choco tinamou
- Choco toucan
- Chocó trogon
- Choco tyrannulet
- Chocó vireo
- Choco warbler
- Chocó woodpecker
- Chocolate boobook
- Chocolate-backed kingfisher
- Chocolate-vented tyrant
- †Choiseul pigeon
- Chopi blackbird
- Chorister robin-chat
- Chotoy spinetail
- Chowchilla
- Christmas boobook
- Christmas frigatebird
- Christmas imperial pigeon
- Christmas island thrush
- Christmas shearwater
- Christmas swiftlet
- Christmas white-eye
- Chubb's cisticola
- Chubut steamer duck
- Chucao tapaculo
- Chuck-will's-widow
- Chukar partridge
- Churring cisticola
- Chusquea tapaculo
- Chuuk flycatcher
- Chuuk monarch
- Cinderella waxbill
- Cinereous antshrike
- Cinereous becard
- Cinereous bulbul
- Cinereous bunting
- Cinereous conebill
- Cinereous finch
- Cinereous ground tyrant
- Cinereous harrier
- Cinereous mourner
- Cinereous owl
- Cinereous tinamou
- Cinereous tit
- Cinereous tyrant
- Cinereous vulture
- Cinereous warbling finch
- Cinereous-breasted spinetail
- Cinnabar boobook
- Cinnamon attila
- Cinnamon becard
- Cinnamon bittern
- Cinnamon bracken warbler
- Cinnamon flycatcher
- Cinnamon ground dove
- Cinnamon hummingbird
- Cinnamon ibon
- Cinnamon neopipo
- Cinnamon quail-thrush
- Cinnamon screech owl
- Cinnamon tanager
- Cinnamon teal
- Cinnamon warbling finch
- Cinnamon weaver
- Cinnamon woodpecker
- Cinnamon-banded kingfisher
- Cinnamon-bellied flowerpiercer
- Cinnamon-bellied ground tyrant
- Cinnamon-bellied imperial pigeon
- Cinnamon-bellied saltator
- Cinnamon-breasted bunting
- Cinnamon-breasted tody-tyrant
- Cinnamon-breasted warbler
- Cinnamon-browed melidectes
- Cinnamon-chested bee-eater
- Cinnamon-chested flycatcher
- Cinnamon-crested spadebill
- Cinnamon-faced tyrannulet
- Cinnamon-headed green pigeon
- Cinnamon-rumped foliage-gleaner
- Cinnamon-rumped seedeater
- Cinnamon-rumped trogon
- Cinnamon-tailed sparrow
- Cinnamon-throated hermit
- Cinnamon-throated woodcreeper
- Cinnamon-vented piha
- Cipo canastero
- Cirl bunting
- Citreoline trogon
- Citril finch
- Citrine canary-flycatcher
- Citrine wagtail
- Citrine warbler
- Citrine white-eye
- Citron-bellied attila
- Citron-crested cockatoo
- Citron-headed yellow finch
- Clamorous reed warbler
- Clapper rail
- Clapperton's spurfowl
- Claret-breasted fruit dove
- Clarión wren
- Clark's grebe
- Clark's nutcracker
- Claudia's leaf warbler
- Clay-colored sparrow
- Clay-colored thrush
- Clicking shrike-babbler
- Cliff flycatcher
- Cliff parakeet
- Cloud cisticola
- Cloud-forest pygmy owl
- Cloud-forest screech owl
- Cloven-feathered dove
- Club-winged manakin
- Coal tit
- Coal-crested finch
- Coastal cisticola
- Coastal miner
- Cobalt-rumped parrotlet
- Cobalt-winged parakeet
- Cobb's wren
- Cocha antshrike
- Cochabamba mountain finch
- Cock-tailed tyrant
- Cockatiel
- Cocoa thrush
- Cocoa woodcreeper
- Cocoi heron
- Coconut lorikeet
- Cocos booby
- Cocos cuckoo
- Cocos finch
- Cocos tyrannulet
- Coiba spinetail
- Coleto
- Colima pygmy owl
- Colima warbler
- Collared antshrike
- Collared aracari
- Collared babbler
- Collared brushturkey
- Collared bush robin
- Collared crescentchest
- Collared crow
- Collared falconet
- Collared finchbill
- Collared flycatcher
- Collared forest falcon
- Collared gnatwren
- Collared grosbeak
- Collared imperial pigeon
- Collared inca
- Collared kingfisher
- Collared lark
- Collared laughingthrush
- Collared lory
- Collared myna
- Collared nightjar
- Collared owlet
- Collared palm thrush
- Collared petrel
- Collared plover
- Collared pratincole
- Collared puffbird
- Collared scops owl
- Collared sparrowhawk
- Collared sunbird
- Collared towhee
- Collared treepie
- Collared trogon
- Collared warbling finch
- Collared whitestart
- Colombian chachalaca
- Colombian crake
- †Colombian grebe
- Colombian mountain grackle
- Colorful puffleg
- Comb duck
- Comb-crested jacana
- Common babbler
- Common black hawk
- Common blackbird
- Common bronzewing
- Common bulbul
- Common buttonquail
- Common buzzard
- Common cactus finch
- Common chiffchaff
- Common chlorospingus
- Common crane
- Common cuckoo
- Common diving petrel
- Common eider
- Common emerald dove
- Common firecrest
- Common flameback
- Common gallinule
- Common goldeneye
- Common grackle
- Common grasshopper warbler
- Common green magpie
- Common greenshank
- Common ground dove
- Common gull
- Common hawk-cuckoo
- Common hill myna
- Common hoopoe
- Common iora
- Common jery
- Common kestrel
- Common kingfisher
- Common linnet
- Common loon
- Common merganser
- Common miner
- Common moorhen
- Common murre
- Common myna
- Common newtonia
- Common nighthawk
- Common nightingale
- Common ostrich
- Common pheasant
- Common pochard
- Common poorwill
- Common potoo
- Common quail
- Common redshank
- Common redstart
- Common reed bunting
- Common reed warbler
- Common ringed plover
- Common rock thrush
- Common rosefinch
- Common sandpiper
- Common scale-backed antbird
- Common scimitarbill
- Common scoter
- Common shelduck
- Common smoky honeyeater
- Common snipe
- Common squirrel cuckoo
- Common starling
- Common sunbird-asity
- Common swift
- Common tailorbird
- Common tern
- Common tody-flycatcher
- Common waxbill
- Common whitethroat
- Common wood pigeon
- Common woodshrike
- Common yellowthroat
- Comoro black parrot
- Comoro blue pigeon
- Comoro blue vanga
- Comoro cuckooshrike
- Comoro fody
- Comoro green pigeon
- Comoro olive pigeon
- Comoro thrush
- Compact weaver
- Cone-billed tanager
- Congo martin
- Congo moor chat
- Congo peafowl
- Congo pied hornbill
- Congo saw-wing
- Congo serpent eagle
- Congo sunbird
- Connecticut warbler
- Cook reed warbler
- Cook's petrel
- Cooper's hawk
- Coopmans's elaenia
- Copper pheasant
- Copper seedeater
- Copper sunbird
- Copper-rumped hummingbird
- Copper-tailed hummingbird
- Copper-tailed starling
- Copper-throated sunbird
- Copperback quail-thrush
- Coppersmith barbet
- Coppery emerald
- Coppery metaltail
- Coppery-bellied puffleg
- Coppery-chested jacamar
- Coppery-headed emerald
- Coppery-tailed coucal
- Coppery-tailed trogon
- Coquerel's coua
- Coqui francolin
- Coral-billed ground cuckoo
- Coraya wren
- Cordillera Azul antbird
- Cordillera ground warbler
- Cordilleran canastero
- Cordilleran parakeet
- Córdoba cinclodes
- Corn bunting
- Corn crake
- Coroneted fruit dove
- Correndera pipit
- Corsican finch
- Corsican nuthatch
- Cory's shearwater
- Coscoroba swan
- Costa Rican brushfinch
- Costa Rican pygmy owl
- Costa Rican swift
- Costa's hummingbird
- Cotton pygmy goose
- Couch's kingbird
- Cozumel emerald
- Cozumel thrasher
- Cozumel vireo
- Cozumel wren
- Crab-plover
- Crag chilia
- Crane hawk
- Craveri's murrelet
- Cream-backed woodpecker
- Cream-bellied fruit dove
- Cream-colored woodpecker
- Cream-coloured courser
- Cream-eyed bulbul
- Cream-striped bulbul
- Cream-throated white-eye
- Cream-vented bulbul
- Cream-winged cinclodes
- Creamy-bellied antwren
- Creamy-bellied gnatcatcher
- Creamy-bellied thrush
- Creamy-crested spinetail
- Creamy-rumped miner
- Crescent honeyeater
- Crescent-chested babbler
- Crescent-chested puffbird
- Crescent-chested warbler
- Crescent-faced antpitta
- Crested ant tanager
- Crested auklet
- Crested barbet
- Crested becard
- Crested bellbird
- Crested black tyrant
- Crested bobwhite
- Crested bunting
- Crested caracara
- Crested coua
- Crested cuckoo-dove
- Crested doradito
- Crested drongo
- Crested duck
- Crested eagle
- Crested finchbill
- Crested francolin
- Crested gallito
- Crested goshawk
- Crested guan
- Crested heleia
- Crested honey buzzard
- Crested hornero
- Crested ibis
- Crested jayshrike
- Crested kingfisher
- Crested lark
- Crested malimbe
- Crested myna
- Crested oropendola
- Crested owl
- Crested partridge
- Crested pigeon
- Crested quail-dove
- Crested quetzal
- Crested satinbird
- Crested serpent eagle
- Crested shelduck
- Crested spinetail
- Crested tit
- Crested tit-warbler
- Crested treeswift
- Crestless curassow
- Cretzschmar's bunting
- Cricket warbler
- Crimson chat
- Crimson finch
- Crimson fruitcrow
- Crimson rosella
- Crimson seedcracker
- Crimson shining parrot
- Crimson sunbird
- Crimson topaz
- Crimson-backed flameback
- Crimson-backed sunbird
- Crimson-backed tanager
- Crimson-bellied parakeet
- Crimson-bellied woodpecker
- Crimson-breasted finch
- Crimson-breasted flowerpecker
- Crimson-breasted shrike
- Crimson-browed finch
- Crimson-collared grosbeak
- Crimson-collared tanager
- Crimson-crested woodpecker
- Crimson-crowned flowerpecker
- Crimson-crowned fruit dove
- Crimson-fronted barbet
- Crimson-fronted cardinal
- Crimson-headed partridge
- Crimson-hooded manakin
- Crimson-mantled woodpecker
- Crimson-naped woodpecker
- Crimson-rumped myzomela
- Crimson-rumped toucanet
- Crimson-rumped waxbill
- Crimson-winged finch
- Crimson-winged woodpecker
- Crinkle-collared manucode
- Crissal thrasher
- Croaking cisticola
- Croaking ground dove
- Crocker jungle flycatcher
- Crossley's ground thrush
- Crossley's vanga
- Crow honeyeater
- Crow-billed drongo
- Crowned chat-tyrant
- Crowned cormorant
- Crowned eagle
- Crowned hornbill
- Crowned lapwing
- Crowned sandgrouse
- Crowned slaty flycatcher
- Crowned woodnymph
- Cryptic antthrush
- Cryptic becard
- Cryptic flycatcher
- Cryptic forest falcon
- Cryptic honeyeater
- †Cryptic treehunter
- Cryptic warbler
- Cuban amazon
- Cuban black hawk
- Cuban blackbird
- Cuban bullfinch
- Cuban crow
- Cuban emerald
- Cuban gnatcatcher
- Cuban grassquit
- Cuban green woodpecker
- Cuban kite
- †Cuban macaw
- Cuban martin
- Cuban nightjar
- Cuban oriole
- Cuban palm crow
- Cuban parakeet
- Cuban pewee
- Cuban pygmy owl
- Cuban solitaire
- Cuban tody
- Cuban trogon
- Cuban vireo
- Cuckoo-finch
- Cuckoo-roller
- Cundinamarca antpitta
- Curl-crested aracari
- Curl-crested jay
- Curl-crested manucode
- Curlew sandpiper
- Curve-billed reedhaunter
- Curve-billed scythebill
- Curve-billed thrasher
- Curve-billed tinamou
- Cut-throat finch
- Cuzco brushfinch
- Cuzco warbler
- Cyprus scops owl
- Cyprus warbler
- Cyprus wheatear

== D ==
- Dagua thrush
- Dalat bush warbler
- Dalmatian pelican
- Damar flycatcher
- Damara red-billed hornbill
- Damara tern
- Dambo cisticola
- Dapple-throat
- Darjeeling woodpecker
- Dark batis
- Dark chanting goshawk
- Dark newtonia
- Dark pewee
- Dark-backed imperial pigeon
- Dark-backed sibia
- Dark-backed weaver
- Dark-backed wood quail
- Dark-bellied cinclodes
- Dark-billed cuckoo
- Dark-breasted rosefinch
- Dark-breasted spinetail
- Dark-eared myza
- Dark-eyed junco
- Dark-eyed white-eye
- Dark-faced ground tyrant
- Dark-fronted babbler
- Dark-necked tailorbird
- Dark-rumped rosefinch
- Dark-rumped swift
- Dark-sided flycatcher
- Dark-sided thrush
- Dark-throated oriole
- Dark-throated seedeater
- Dark-winged canastero
- Dark-winged miner
- Dark-winged trumpeter
- D'Arnaud's barbet
- Dartford warbler
- Darwin's nothura
- Daurian jackdaw
- Daurian partridge
- Daurian redstart
- Daurian starling
- David's fulvetta
- Davison's leaf warbler
- Dayak blue flycatcher
- Dead Sea sparrow
- Delicate prinia
- Delta Amacuro softtail
- Demoiselle crane
- Denham's bustard
- Des Murs's wiretail
- Desert cisticola
- Desert finch
- Desert lark
- Desert owl
- Desert sparrow
- Desert wheatear
- Desertas petrel
- Diademed amazon
- Diademed sandpiper-plover
- Diademed tanager
- Diademed tapaculo
- Diamantina sabrewing
- Diamantina tapaculo
- Diamond dove
- Diamond firetail
- Diard's trogon
- Dickcissel
- Dickinson's kestrel
- Diederik cuckoo
- †Dieffenbach's rail
- Dimorphic dwarf kingfisher
- Dimorphic fantail
- Dinelli's doradito
- Diuca finch
- Dja River scrub warbler
- Djibouti spurfowl
- †Dodo
- Doherty's bushshrike
- Dohrn's warbler
- Dolphin gull
- Donaldson Smith's nightjar
- Donaldson Smith's sparrow-weaver
- D'Orbigny's chat-tyrant
- Doria's hawk
- Dorst's cisticola
- Dot-backed antbird
- Dot-eared coquette
- Dot-fronted woodpecker
- Dot-winged antwren
- Dot-winged crake
- Dotted tanager
- Double-banded courser
- Double-banded greytail
- Double-banded plover
- Double-banded pygmy tyrant
- Double-banded sandgrouse
- Double-barred finch
- Double-collared seedeater
- Double-crested cormorant
- Double-eyed fig parrot
- Double-spurred spurfowl
- Double-striped thick-knee
- Double-toothed barbet
- Double-toothed kite
- Downy woodpecker
- Drab hemispingus
- Drab myzomela
- Drab seedeater
- Drab swiftlet
- Drab water tyrant
- Drab whistler
- Drab-breasted bamboo tyrant
- Drakensberg prinia
- Drakensberg rockjumper
- Drakensberg siskin
- Drongo fantail
- Dubois's seedeater
- Duchess lorikeet
- Duetting giant honeyeater
- Dugand's antwren
- Duida grass finch
- Duida woodcreeper
- Dulit frogmouth
- Dulit partridge
- Dull-blue flycatcher
- Dull-coloured grassquit
- Dull-mantled antbird
- Dune lark
- Dunlin
- Dunn's lark
- Dunnock
- Dupont's lark
- Dusky antbird
- Dusky babbler
- Dusky broadbill
- Dusky chlorospingus
- Dusky crag martin
- Dusky crested flycatcher
- Dusky crimsonwing
- Dusky eagle-owl
- Dusky fulvetta
- Dusky gerygone
- Dusky grasswren
- Dusky grouse
- Dusky hummingbird
- Dusky indigobird
- Dusky lark
- Dusky leaftosser
- Dusky long-tailed cuckoo
- Dusky lory
- Dusky megapode
- Dusky moorhen
- Dusky munia
- Dusky myzomela
- Dusky nightjar
- Dusky parrot
- Dusky pigeon
- Dusky piha
- Dusky purpletuft
- Dusky robin
- Dusky spinetail
- Dusky starfrontlet
- Dusky sunbird
- Dusky tapaculo
- Dusky tetraka
- Dusky thrush
- Dusky tit
- Dusky turtle dove
- Dusky twinspot
- Dusky warbler
- Dusky white-eye
- Dusky woodswallow
- Dusky-backed jacamar
- Dusky-billed parrotlet
- Dusky-blue flycatcher
- Dusky-brown oriole
- Dusky-capped flycatcher
- Dusky-capped greenlet
- Dusky-capped woodcreeper
- Dusky-cheeked fig parrot
- Dusky-chested flycatcher
- Dusky-faced tanager
- Dusky-green oropendola
- Dusky-headed brushfinch
- Dusky-headed parakeet
- Dusky-legged guan
- Dusky-tailed antbird
- Dusky-tailed canastero
- Dusky-tailed flatbill
- Dusky-throated antshrike
- Dusky-throated hermit
- Dwarf bittern
- Dwarf cassowary
- Dwarf cuckoo
- Dwarf fruit dove
- Dwarf honeyguide
- Dwarf jay
- Dwarf koel
- Dwarf sparrowhawk
- Dwarf tinamou
- Dwarf tyrant-manakin
- Dwarf vireo
- Dybowski's twinspot

== E ==
- Eared dove
- Eared pitta
- Eared poorwill
- Eared pygmy tyrant
- Eared quetzal
- East Amazonian fire-eye
- East Andean antbird
- East Brazilian chachalaca
- East Brazilian pygmy owl
- East coast akalat
- East Coast boubou
- Eastern alpine mannikin
- Eastern barn owl
- Eastern bearded greenbul
- Eastern black-eared wheatear
- Eastern black-headed batis
- Eastern bluebird
- Eastern bluebonnet
- Eastern Bonelli's warbler
- Eastern bristlebird
- Eastern bronze-naped pigeon
- Eastern buzzard
- Eastern cattle egret
- Eastern chanting goshawk
- Eastern chat-tanager
- Eastern clapper lark
- Eastern crested berrypecker
- Eastern crested guineafowl
- Eastern crowned warbler
- Eastern double-collared sunbird
- Eastern dwarf hornbill
- Eastern golden weaver
- Eastern grass owl
- Eastern grey woodpecker
- Eastern hooded pitta
- Eastern imperial eagle
- Eastern kingbird
- Eastern long-billed lark
- Eastern long-tailed hornbill
- Eastern marsh harrier
- Eastern marsh wren
- Eastern meadowlark
- Eastern miombo sunbird
- Eastern nicator
- Eastern olivaceous flatbill
- Eastern olivaceous warbler
- Eastern Orphean warbler
- Eastern parotia
- Eastern phoebe
- Eastern plantain-eater
- Eastern red-legged thrush
- Eastern red-rumped swallow
- Eastern rock nuthatch
- Eastern rockhopper penguin
- Eastern rosella
- Eastern screech owl
- Eastern shriketit
- Eastern spinebill
- Eastern spot-billed duck
- Eastern striolated puffbird
- Eastern subalpine warbler
- Eastern towhee
- Eastern violet-backed sunbird
- Eastern warbling vireo
- Eastern wattled cuckooshrike
- Eastern whip-poor-will
- Eastern whipbird
- Eastern wood pewee
- Eastern woodhaunter
- Eastern yellow robin
- Eastern yellow wagtail
- Eastern yellow-billed barbet
- Eastern yellow-billed hornbill
- Eaton's pintail
- Echo parakeet
- Ecuadorian cacique
- Ecuadorian ground dove
- Ecuadorian hillstar
- Ecuadorian piculet
- Ecuadorian piedtail
- Ecuadorian rail
- Ecuadorian seedeater
- Ecuadorian thrush
- Ecuadorian trogon
- Ecuadorian tyrannulet
- Edible-nest swiftlet
- Edwards's fig parrot
- Edwards's pheasant
- Egyptian goose
- Egyptian nightjar
- Egyptian plover
- Egyptian vulture
- †Eiao monarch
- El Oro parakeet
- El Oro tapaculo
- Elegant crescentchest
- Elegant crested tinamou
- Elegant euphonia
- Elegant honeyeater
- Elegant imperial pigeon
- Elegant parrot
- Elegant pitta
- Elegant quail
- Elegant sunbird
- Elegant tern
- Elegant tit
- Elegant trogon
- Elegant woodcreeper
- Eleonora's falcon
- Elf owl
- Elfin woods warbler
- Elgon francolin
- Elliot's laughingthrush
- Elliot's pheasant
- Elliot's storm petrel
- Elliot's woodpecker
- Elusive antpitta
- Emei leaf warbler
- Emei Shan liocichla
- Emerald starling
- Emerald tanager
- Emerald-bellied puffleg
- Emerald-chinned hummingbird
- Emerald-spotted wood dove
- Emin's shrike
- Emperor bird-of-paradise
- Emperor fairywren
- Emperor goose
- Emperor penguin
- Empress brilliant
- Emu
- Enggano cuckoo-dove
- Enggano imperial pigeon
- Enggano scops owl
- Enggano thrush
- Epaulet oriole
- Equatorial akalat
- Equatorial antpitta
- Equatorial greytail
- Erckel's spurfowl
- Erect-crested penguin
- Eskimo curlew
- Esmeraldas antbird
- Esmeraldas woodstar
- Española cactus finch
- Espanola mockingbird
- Ethiopian bee-eater
- Ethiopian boubou
- Ethiopian bushcrow
- Ethiopian cisticola
- Ethiopian oriole
- Ethiopian siskin
- Ethiopian swallow
- Ethiopian thrush
- Ethiopian white-eye
- Euler's flycatcher
- Eungella honeyeater
- Eurasian bittern
- Eurasian blackcap
- Eurasian blue tit
- Eurasian bullfinch
- Eurasian chaffinch
- Eurasian collared dove
- Eurasian coot
- Eurasian crag martin
- Eurasian curlew
- Eurasian dotterel
- Eurasian eagle-owl
- Eurasian golden oriole
- Eurasian goshawk
- Eurasian hobby
- Eurasian jay
- Eurasian magpie
- Eurasian nuthatch
- Eurasian oystercatcher
- Eurasian penduline tit
- Eurasian pygmy owl
- Eurasian scops owl
- Eurasian siskin
- Eurasian skylark
- Eurasian sparrowhawk
- Eurasian spoonbill
- Eurasian stone-curlew
- Eurasian three-toed woodpecker
- Eurasian tree sparrow
- Eurasian treecreeper
- Eurasian whimbrel
- Eurasian wigeon
- Eurasian woodcock
- Eurasian wren
- Eurasian wryneck
- European bee-eater
- European golden plover
- European goldfinch
- European green woodpecker
- European greenfinch
- European herring gull
- European honey buzzard
- European nightjar
- European pied flycatcher
- European red-rumped swallow
- European robin
- European rock pipit
- European roller
- European serin
- European shag
- European stonechat
- European storm petrel
- European turtle dove
- Evening grosbeak
- Everett's scops owl
- Everett's thrush
- Everett's white-eye
- Evergreen forest warbler
- Eversmann's redstart
- Exclamatory paradise whydah
- Eye-ringed flatbill
- Eye-ringed parrotbill
- Eye-ringed thistletail
- Eye-ringed tody-tyrant
- Eyebrowed heleia
- Eyebrowed jungle flycatcher
- Eyebrowed thrush
- Eyebrowed wren-babbler
- Eyrean grasswren

== F ==
- Fairy flycatcher
- Fairy gerygone
- Fairy lorikeet
- Fairy martin
- Fairy pitta
- Fairy prion
- Fairy tern
- Falcated duck
- Falcated wren-babbler
- Falkenstein's greenbul
- Falkland steamer duck
- Familiar chat
- Fan-tailed berrypecker
- Fan-tailed cuckoo
- Fan-tailed gerygone
- Fan-tailed grassbird
- Fan-tailed raven
- Fan-tailed warbler
- Fan-tailed widowbird
- Fanti saw-wing
- Far Eastern curlew
- Fasciated antshrike
- Fasciated tiger heron
- Fasciated wren
- Fatu Hiva monarch
- Fawn-breasted bowerbird
- Fawn-breasted brilliant
- Fawn-breasted tanager
- Fawn-breasted thrush
- Fawn-breasted waxbill
- Fawn-breasted whistler
- Fawn-breasted wren
- Fawn-coloured lark
- Fawn-throated foliage-gleaner
- Fearful owl
- Feline owlet-nightjar
- Fernandina's flicker
- Fernando Po batis
- Fernando Po speirops
- Fernwren
- Ferruginous antbird
- Ferruginous babbler
- Ferruginous duck
- Ferruginous flycatcher
- Ferruginous hawk
- Ferruginous partridge
- Ferruginous pygmy owl
- Ferruginous-backed antbird
- Festive amazon
- Festive coquette
- Field sparrow
- Fieldfare
- Fiery minivet
- Fiery topaz
- Fiery-billed aracari
- Fiery-breasted bushshrike
- Fiery-browed starling
- Fiery-capped manakin
- Fiery-necked nightjar
- Fiery-shouldered parakeet
- Fiery-tailed awlbill
- Fiery-throated fruiteater
- Fiery-throated hummingbird
- Fiery-throated metaltail
- Fiji bush warbler
- Fiji goshawk
- Fiji island thrush
- Fiji parrotfinch
- Fiji petrel
- Fiji shrikebill
- Fiji streaked fantail
- Fiji wattled honeyeater
- Fiji white-eye
- Fiji woodswallow
- Fine-banded woodpecker
- Fine-barred piculet
- Fine-spotted woodpecker
- Finn's weaver
- Finsch's bulbul
- Finsch's euphonia
- Finsch's francolin
- Finsch's imperial pigeon
- Finsch's parakeet
- Finsch's pygmy parrot
- Finsch's rufous thrush
- Finsch's wheatear
- Fiordland penguin
- Fire-bellied woodpecker
- Fire-breasted flowerpecker
- Fire-capped tit
- Fire-crested alethe
- Fire-eyed diucon
- Fire-fronted bishop
- Fire-maned bowerbird
- Fire-tailed myzornis
- Fire-tailed sunbird
- Fire-throated flowerpecker
- Fire-tufted barbet
- Firethroat
- Firewood-gatherer
- Fiscal flycatcher
- Fischer's greenbul
- Fischer's lovebird
- Fischer's sparrow-lark
- Fischer's starling
- Fischer's turaco
- Fish crow
- Five-colored barbet
- Five-colored munia
- Five-striped sparrow
- Flame bowerbird
- Flame robin
- Flame-breasted fruit dove
- Flame-breasted sunbird
- Flame-colored tanager
- Flame-crested manakin
- Flame-crested tanager
- Flame-crowned flowerpecker
- Flame-eared honeyeater
- Flame-faced tanager
- Flame-fronted barbet
- Flame-rumped tanager
- Flame-templed babbler
- Flame-throated bulbul
- Flame-throated sunangel
- Flame-throated warbler
- Flame-winged parakeet
- Flamecrest
- Flaming sunbird
- Flammulated bamboo tyrant
- Flammulated flycatcher
- Flammulated owl
- Flammulated treehunter
- Flappet lark
- Flat-billed kingfisher
- Flat-billed vireo
- Flavescent bulbul
- Flavescent flycatcher
- Flavescent warbler
- Flesh-footed shearwater
- Flightless cormorant
- Flock bronzewing
- Floreana mockingbird
- Flores crow
- Flores flowerpecker
- Flores green pigeon
- Flores hawk-eagle
- Flores jungle flycatcher
- Flores monarch
- Flores scops owl
- Flores Sea cuckoo-dove
- Flores Sea sunbird
- Flores shortwing
- Florida scrub jay
- Fluffy-backed tit-babbler
- Flutist wren
- Fluttering shearwater
- Fly River grassbird
- Flying steamer duck
- Foothill elaenia
- Foothill schiffornis
- Foothill screech owl
- Foothill stipplethroat
- Forbes-Watson's swift
- Forbes's blackbird
- Forbes's forest rail
- Forbes's mannikin
- Forbes's plover
- Forest bittern
- Forest buzzard
- Forest canary
- Forest double-collared sunbird
- Forest elaenia
- Forest fody
- Forest honeyeater
- Forest kingfisher
- Forest owlet
- Forest penduline tit
- Forest raven
- Forest rock thrush
- Forest scrub robin
- Forest swallow
- Forest thrush
- Forest wagtail
- Forest white-eye
- Forest wood hoopoe
- Fork-tailed drongo
- Fork-tailed drongo-cuckoo
- Fork-tailed flycatcher
- Fork-tailed palm swift
- Fork-tailed storm petrel
- Fork-tailed sunbird
- Fork-tailed swift
- Fork-tailed tody-tyrant
- Fork-tailed woodnymph
- Forster's tern
- Forty-spotted pardalote
- Four-banded sandgrouse
- Fox kestrel
- Fox sparrow
- Fox's weaver
- Foxy cisticola
- Frances's sparrowhawk
- Franklin's gull
- Fraser's eagle-owl
- Fraser's forest flycatcher
- Fraser's rufous thrush
- Fraser's sunbird
- Freckle-breasted thornbird
- Freckle-breasted woodpecker
- Freckled duck
- Freckled nightjar
- Friedmann's lark
- Friendly bush warbler
- Friendly fantail
- Frill-necked monarch
- Frilled coquette
- Frilled monarch
- Fringe-backed fire-eye
- Fruithunter
- Fuegian snipe
- Fuegian steamer duck
- Fuertes's parrot
- Fujian niltava
- Fülleborn's boubou
- Fülleborn's longclaw
- Fulmar prion
- Fulvous antshrike
- Fulvous babbler
- Fulvous owl
- Fulvous parrotbill
- Fulvous shrike-tanager
- Fulvous whistling duck
- Fulvous wren
- Fulvous-breasted flatbill
- Fulvous-breasted woodpecker
- Fulvous-chested jungle flycatcher
- Fulvous-chinned nunlet
- Fulvous-crested tanager
- Fulvous-crowned scrub tyrant
- Fulvous-faced scrub tyrant
- Fulvous-headed brushfinch
- Fulvous-headed tanager
- Fulvous-vented euphonia
- Furtive flycatcher
- Fuscous flycatcher
- Fuscous honeyeater
- Fynbos buttonquail

== G ==
- Gabar goshawk
- Gabela akalat
- Gabela bushshrike
- Gabela helmetshrike
- Gabon batis
- Gabon coucal
- Gabon woodpecker
- Gadwall
- Galah
- Galapagos crake
- Galápagos dove
- Galapagos flycatcher
- Galapagos hawk
- Galápagos martin
- Galápagos mockingbird
- Galapagos penguin
- Galápagos petrel
- Galápagos shearwater
- Gambaga flycatcher
- Gambel's quail
- Gang-gang cockatoo
- Gansu leaf warbler
- Garden emerald
- Garden sunbird
- Garden warbler
- Garganey
- Garnet pitta
- Garnet robin
- Garnet-throated hummingbird
- †Garrett's reed warbler
- Gartered trogon
- Geelvink cicadabird
- Geelvink fruit dove
- Geelvink imperial pigeon
- Geelvink pygmy parrot
- Genovesa cactus finch
- Genovesa ground finch
- Gentoo penguin
- Geoffroy's daggerbill
- Geomalia
- Germain's peacock-pheasant
- Giant antpitta
- Giant antshrike
- Giant babax
- Giant conebill
- Giant coot
- Giant coua
- Giant cowbird
- Giant grey shrike
- Giant ibis
- Giant kingbird
- Giant kingfisher
- Giant laughingthrush
- Giant nuthatch
- Giant pitta
- Giant scops owl
- Giant snipe
- Giant sunbird
- Giant swiftlet
- Giant weaver
- Giant white-eye
- Giant wood rail
- Giant wren
- Gibberbird
- Gila woodpecker
- Gilbert's honeyeater
- Gilbert's whistler
- Gilded barbet
- Gilded flicker
- Gilded sapphire
- Gillett's lark
- Gilliard's honeyeater
- Gilolo fantail
- Gilt-edged tanager
- Gizo white-eye
- Glacier finch
- Glaucous gull
- Glaucous macaw
- Glaucous tanager
- Glaucous-blue grosbeak
- Glaucous-winged gull
- Glistening-green tanager
- Glittering-bellied emerald
- Glittering-throated emerald
- Glossy antshrike
- Glossy black cockatoo
- Glossy flowerpiercer
- Glossy ibis
- Glossy swiftlet
- Glossy-backed becard
- Glossy-black thrush
- Glossy-mantled manucode
- Glow-throated hummingbird
- Glowing puffleg
- Godlewski's bunting
- Goeldi's antbird
- Gola malimbe
- Gold-ringed tanager
- Goldcrest
- Golden babbler
- Golden bowerbird
- Golden bush robin
- Golden cuckooshrike
- Golden dove
- Golden eagle
- Golden greenbul
- Golden grosbeak
- Golden masked owl
- Golden monarch
- Golden myna
- Golden nightjar
- Golden palm weaver
- Golden parakeet
- Golden parrotbill
- Golden pheasant
- Golden pipit
- Golden swallow
- Golden tanager
- Golden vireo
- Golden white-eye
- Golden-backed bishop
- Golden-backed mountain tanager
- Golden-backed weaver
- Golden-backed whistler
- Golden-bellied flycatcher
- Golden-bellied flyrobin
- Golden-bellied gerygone
- Golden-bellied starfrontlet
- Golden-billed saltator
- Golden-breasted bunting
- Golden-breasted fruiteater
- Golden-breasted fulvetta
- Golden-breasted puffleg
- Golden-breasted starling
- Golden-browed chat-tyrant
- Golden-browed chlorophonia
- Golden-browed warbler
- Golden-capped parakeet
- Golden-cheeked warbler
- Golden-cheeked woodpecker
- Golden-chested tanager
- Golden-chevroned tanager
- Golden-collared honeycreeper
- Golden-collared macaw
- Golden-collared manakin
- Golden-collared tanager
- Golden-collared toucanet
- Golden-collared woodpecker
- Golden-crested myna
- Golden-crowned babbler
- Golden-crowned emerald
- Golden-crowned flycatcher
- Golden-crowned kinglet
- Golden-crowned manakin
- Golden-crowned spadebill
- Golden-crowned sparrow
- Golden-crowned tanager
- Golden-crowned warbler
- Golden-eared tanager
- Golden-eyed flowerpiercer
- Golden-faced tyrannulet
- Golden-fronted bowerbird
- Golden-fronted fulvetta
- Golden-fronted greenlet
- Golden-fronted leafbird
- Golden-fronted whitestart
- Golden-fronted woodpecker
- Golden-green woodpecker
- Golden-headed cisticola
- Golden-headed manakin
- Golden-headed quetzal
- Golden-hooded tanager
- Golden-mantled racket-tail
- Golden-naped barbet
- Golden-naped finch
- Golden-naped tanager
- Golden-naped weaver
- Golden-naped woodpecker
- Golden-olive woodpecker
- Golden-plumed parakeet
- Golden-rumped euphonia
- Golden-rumped flowerpecker
- Golden-shouldered parrot
- Golden-sided euphonia
- Golden-spangled piculet
- Golden-spotted ground dove
- Golden-tailed parrotlet
- Golden-tailed sapphire
- Golden-tailed starfrontlet
- Golden-tailed woodpecker
- Golden-throated barbet
- Golden-tufted mountain grackle
- Golden-whiskered barbet
- Golden-winged cacique
- Golden-winged laughingthrush
- Golden-winged manakin
- Golden-winged parakeet
- Golden-winged sparrow
- Golden-winged sunbird
- Golden-winged tody-flycatcher
- Golden-winged warbler
- Goldenface
- Goldie's bird-of-paradise
- Goldie's lorikeet
- Goliath coucal
- Goliath heron
- Goliath imperial pigeon
- Gorgeous bushshrike
- Gorgeous sunbird
- Gorgeted puffleg
- Gorgeted sunangel
- Gorgeted wood quail
- Gorgeted woodstar
- Gosling's apalis
- Gosling's bunting
- Gough finch
- Gough moorhen
- Gould's frogmouth
- Gould's inca
- Gould's jewelfront
- Gould's petrel
- Gould's shortwing
- Gould's toucanet
- Gouldian finch
- Grace's warbler
- Graceful black-throated trogon
- Graceful honeyeater
- Graceful pitta
- Graceful prinia
- Gran Canaria blue chaffinch
- Grand Cayman bullfinch
- †Grand Cayman thrush
- Grand rhabdornis
- Grandala
- Grande Comore brush warbler
- Grande Comore bulbul
- Grande Comore drongo
- Grant's bluebill
- Grass wren
- Grass-green tanager
- Grasshopper buzzard
- Grasshopper sparrow
- Grassland sparrow
- Grassland yellow finch
- Grauer's broadbill
- Grauer's cuckooshrike
- Grauer's swamp warbler
- Grauer's warbler
- Gray catbird
- Gray hawk
- Gray kingbird
- Gray thrasher
- Gray vireo
- Gray-barred wren
- Gray-cheeked thrush
- Gray-crowned rosy finch
- Gray-headed elaenia
- Gray-headed kite
- Gray-lined hawk
- Gray-throated warbling finch
- Gray's grasshopper warbler
- Gray's lark
- Grayish baywing
- Great antpitta
- Great antshrike
- Great argus
- †Great auk
- Great barbet
- Great black hawk
- Great black-backed gull
- Great blue heron
- Great blue turaco
- Great bowerbird
- Great bustard
- Great cormorant
- Great crested flycatcher
- Great crested grebe
- Great cuckoo-dove
- Great curassow
- Great dusky swift
- Great eared nightjar
- Great egret
- Great elaenia
- Great frigatebird
- Great grebe
- Great green macaw
- Great grey owl
- Great grey shrike
- Great hanging parrot
- Great hornbill
- Great horned owl
- Great Inca finch
- Great Indian bustard
- Great iora
- Great jacamar
- Great kiskadee
- Great knot
- Great lizard cuckoo
- Great myna
- Great Nicobar serpent eagle
- Great parrotbill
- Great potoo
- Great reed warbler
- Great rosefinch
- Great rufous woodcreeper
- Great sapphirewing
- Great shearwater
- Great shortwing
- Great shrike-tyrant
- Great skua
- Great slaty woodpecker
- Great snipe
- Great sparrow
- Great spinetail
- Great spotted cuckoo
- Great spotted kiwi
- Great spotted woodpecker
- Great stone-curlew
- Great Sumba boobook
- Great swallow-tailed swift
- Great thrush
- Great tinamou
- Great tit
- Great white pelican
- Great woodswallow
- Great xenops
- Great-billed hermit
- Great-billed heron
- Great-billed kingfisher
- Great-billed mannikin
- Great-billed parrot
- Great-billed seed finch
- Great-tailed grackle
- Great-winged petrel
- Greater adjutant
- †Greater ʻamakihi
- Greater ani
- Greater Antillean bullfinch
- Greater Antillean grackle
- Greater bird-of-paradise
- Greater blue-eared starling
- Greater coucal
- Greater crested tern
- Greater double-collared sunbird
- Greater flameback
- Greater flamingo
- Greater flowerpiercer
- Greater green leafbird
- Greater ground robin
- Greater honeyguide
- Greater hoopoe-lark
- Greater kestrel
- †Greater koa finch
- Greater lophorina
- Greater melampitta
- Greater necklaced laughingthrush
- Greater painted-snipe
- Greater pewee
- Greater prairie chicken
- Greater racket-tailed drongo
- Greater rhea
- Greater roadrunner
- Greater sand plover
- Greater scaup
- Greater scythebill
- Greater short-toed lark
- Greater spotted eagle
- Greater striped swallow
- Greater swamp warbler
- Greater thornbird
- Greater vasa parrot
- Greater wagtail-tyrant
- Greater white-fronted goose
- Greater yellow finch
- Greater yellow-headed vulture
- Greater yellowlegs
- Greater yellownape
- Green aracari
- Green avadavat
- Green barbet
- Green broadbill
- Green catbird
- Green cochoa
- Green crombec
- Green figbird
- Green hermit
- Green heron
- Green honeycreeper
- Green hylia
- Green ibis
- Green imperial pigeon
- Green inca
- Green iora
- Green jay
- Green jery
- Green junglefowl
- Green kingfisher
- Green longtail
- Green malkoha
- Green manakin
- Green mango
- Green oriole
- Green oropendola
- Green parakeet
- Green peafowl
- Green pheasant
- Green pygmy goose
- Green racket-tail
- Green rosella
- Green sandpiper
- Green shrike-babbler
- Green shrike-vireo
- Green thorntail
- Green tinkerbird
- Green twinspot
- Green warbler
- Green warbler-finch
- Green white-eye
- Green wood hoopoe
- Green-and-black fruiteater
- Green-and-gold tanager
- Green-and-rufous kingfisher
- Green-and-white hummingbird
- Green-backed becard
- Green-backed eremomela
- Green-backed firecrown
- Green-backed flycatcher
- Green-backed gerygone
- Green-backed hillstar
- Green-backed honeybird
- Green-backed honeyeater
- Green-backed kingfisher
- Green-backed robin
- Green-backed sparrow
- Green-backed tailorbird
- Green-backed tit
- Green-backed trogon
- Green-backed whistler
- Green-backed white-eye
- Green-backed woodpecker
- Green-barred woodpecker
- Green-bearded helmetcrest
- Green-bellied hummingbird
- Green-billed coucal
- Green-billed malkoha
- Green-breasted bushshrike
- Green-breasted mango
- Green-breasted mountaingem
- Green-breasted pitta
- Green-capped eremomela
- Green-capped tanager
- Green-cheeked parakeet
- Green-chinned euphonia
- Green-crowned brilliant
- Green-crowned plovercrest
- Green-crowned warbler
- Green-eared barbet
- Green-faced parrotfinch
- Green-fronted hummingbird
- Green-fronted lancebill
- Green-headed hillstar
- Green-headed oriole
- Green-headed sunbird
- Green-headed tanager
- Green-legged partridge
- Green-naped tanager
- Green-rumped parrotlet
- Green-striped brushfinch
- Green-tailed bristlebill
- Green-tailed emerald
- Green-tailed goldenthroat
- Green-tailed jacamar
- Green-tailed sunbird
- Green-tailed towhee
- Green-tailed trainbearer
- Green-tailed warbler
- Green-throated carib
- Green-throated mango
- Green-throated mountaingem
- Green-throated sunbird
- Green-winged pytilia
- Green-winged saltator
- Green-winged teal
- Greenish elaenia
- Greenish puffleg
- Greenish schiffornis
- Greenish tyrannulet
- Greenish warbler
- Greenish yellow finch
- Grenada dove
- Grenada flycatcher
- Grenada wren
- Grey antbird
- Grey antwren
- Grey apalis
- Grey bunting
- Grey bush chat
- Grey butcherbird
- Grey crow
- Grey crowned crane
- Grey cuckooshrike
- Grey currawong
- Grey emutail
- Grey falcon
- Grey fantail
- Grey francolin
- Grey friarbird
- Grey gerygone
- Grey go-away-bird
- Grey goshawk
- Grey grasswren
- Grey ground thrush
- Grey gull
- Grey heron
- Grey honeyeater
- Grey hypocolius
- Grey imperial pigeon
- Grey junglefowl
- Grey kestrel
- Grey laughingthrush
- Grey longbill
- Grey monjita
- Grey nightjar
- Grey noddy
- Grey parrot
- Grey partridge
- Grey peacock-pheasant
- Grey penduline tit
- Grey petrel
- Grey pileated finch
- Grey plover
- Grey pratincole
- Grey seedeater
- Grey shrikethrush
- Grey sibia
- Grey silky-flycatcher
- Grey sunbird
- Grey teal
- Grey thornbill
- Grey tinamou
- Grey tit
- Grey tit-flycatcher
- Grey treepie
- Grey trembler
- Grey wagtail
- Grey warbler-finch
- Grey waxbill
- Grey whistler
- Grey wren
- Grey wren-warbler
- Grey-and-buff woodpecker
- Grey-and-gold tanager
- Grey-and-gold warbler
- Grey-and-white tyrannulet
- Grey-backed cisticola
- Grey-backed fiscal
- Grey-backed hawk
- Grey-backed shrike
- Grey-backed sparrow-lark
- Grey-backed storm petrel
- Grey-backed tachuri
- Grey-backed tailorbird
- Grey-backed thrush
- Grey-banded mannikin
- Grey-bellied antbird
- Grey-bellied bulbul
- Grey-bellied comet
- Grey-bellied cuckoo
- Grey-bellied flowerpiercer
- Grey-bellied hawk
- Grey-bellied shrike-tyrant
- Grey-bellied spinetail
- Grey-bellied tesia
- Grey-bellied wren-babbler
- Grey-breasted babbler
- Grey-breasted crake
- Grey-breasted flycatcher
- Grey-breasted martin
- Grey-breasted mountain toucan
- Grey-breasted parakeet
- Grey-breasted partridge
- Grey-breasted prinia
- Grey-breasted sabrewing
- Grey-breasted seedsnipe
- Grey-breasted spiderhunter
- Grey-breasted spurfowl
- Grey-breasted wood wren
- Grey-breasted woodpecker
- Grey-browed brushfinch
- Grey-browed wren
- Grey-brown white-eye
- Grey-capped cuckoo
- Grey-capped flycatcher
- Grey-capped hemispingus
- Grey-capped pygmy woodpecker
- Grey-capped social weaver
- Grey-capped tyrannulet
- Grey-capped warbler
- Grey-cheeked bulbul
- Grey-cheeked fulvetta
- Grey-cheeked green pigeon
- Grey-cheeked nunlet
- Grey-cheeked parakeet
- Grey-cheeked tit-babbler
- Grey-cheeked warbler
- Grey-chested babbler
- Grey-chested dove
- Grey-chested greenlet
- Grey-chested jungle flycatcher
- Grey-chinned hermit
- Grey-chinned minivet
- Grey-chinned sunbird
- Grey-collared becard
- Grey-collared oriole
- Grey-cowled wood rail
- Grey-crested cacholote
- Grey-crested finch
- Grey-crested helmetshrike
- Grey-crested tit
- Grey-crowned babbler
- Grey-crowned crocias
- Grey-crowned flatbill
- Grey-crowned goldfinch
- Grey-crowned ground sparrow
- Grey-crowned mannikin
- Grey-crowned palm-tanager
- Grey-crowned prinia
- Grey-crowned tetraka
- Grey-crowned warbler
- Grey-crowned woodpecker
- Grey-crowned yellowthroat
- Grey-eared brushfinch
- Grey-eared honeyeater
- Grey-eyed bulbul
- Grey-eyed greenlet
- Grey-faced buzzard
- Grey-faced petrel
- Grey-faced tit-babbler
- Grey-flanked cinclodes
- Grey-flanked thrush
- Grey-fronted dove
- Grey-fronted green pigeon
- Grey-fronted honeyeater
- Grey-fronted quail-dove
- Grey-green fruit dove
- Grey-green scrubwren
- Grey-headed albatross
- Grey-headed antbird
- Grey-headed babbler
- Grey-headed batis
- Grey-headed bristlebill
- Grey-headed broadbill
- Grey-headed bulbul
- Grey-headed bullfinch
- Grey-headed bushshrike
- Grey-headed canary-flycatcher
- Grey-headed chachalaca
- Grey-headed chickadee
- Grey-headed cuckooshrike
- Grey-headed dove
- Grey-headed fish eagle
- Grey-headed fruit dove
- Grey-headed goshawk
- Grey-headed greenbul
- Grey-headed gull
- Grey-headed honeyeater
- Grey-headed imperial pigeon
- Grey-headed kingfisher
- Grey-headed lapwing
- Grey-headed lovebird
- Grey-headed mannikin
- Grey-headed nigrita
- Grey-headed oliveback
- Grey-headed parakeet
- Grey-headed parrotbill
- Grey-headed piprites
- Grey-headed robin
- Grey-headed silverbill
- Grey-headed spinetail
- Grey-headed sunbird
- Grey-headed tanager
- Grey-headed warbler
- Grey-headed woodpecker
- Grey-hooded attila
- Grey-hooded flycatcher
- Grey-hooded fulvetta
- Grey-hooded heleia
- Grey-hooded parakeet
- Grey-hooded parrotbill
- Grey-hooded sierra finch
- Grey-hooded sunbird
- Grey-hooded warbler
- Grey-legged tinamou
- Grey-lored broadbill
- Grey-mantled wren
- Grey-naped antpitta
- Grey-necked bunting
- Grey-necked rockfowl
- Grey-olive greenbul
- Grey-rumped swallow
- Grey-rumped swift
- Grey-rumped swiftlet
- Grey-rumped treeswift
- Grey-sided bush warbler
- Grey-sided flowerpecker
- Grey-sided laughingthrush
- Grey-sided scimitar babbler
- Grey-sided thrush
- Grey-streaked flycatcher
- Grey-streaked honeyeater
- Grey-striped spurfowl
- Grey-tailed piha
- Grey-tailed tattler
- Grey-throated babbler
- Grey-throated barbet
- Grey-throated chat
- Grey-throated leaftosser
- Grey-throated martin
- Grey-throated rail
- Grey-throated sunbird
- Grey-throated tit-flycatcher
- Grey-throated warbler
- Grey-winged blackbird
- Grey-winged cotinga
- Grey-winged francolin
- Grey-winged Inca finch
- Grey-winged robin-chat
- Grey-winged trumpeter
- Greyish eagle-owl
- Greyish miner
- Greyish mourner
- Greyish piculet
- Greylag goose
- Griffon vulture
- Grimwood's longclaw
- Groove-billed ani
- Groove-billed toucanet
- Grosbeak starling
- Ground cuckooshrike
- Ground parrot
- Ground tit
- Ground woodpecker
- Groundscraper thrush
- Growling riflebird
- Guadalcanal dwarf kingfisher
- Guadalcanal fantail
- Guadalcanal honeyeater
- Guadalcanal owl
- Guadalcanal thicketbird
- Guadalcanal thrush
- Guadalcanal white-eye
- †Guadalupe caracara
- Guadalupe junco
- Guadalupe murrelet
- Guadalupe storm petrel
- Guadeloupe woodpecker
- Guaiabero
- Guaiquinima whitestart
- †Guam flycatcher
- Guam kingfisher
- Guam rail
- Guanay cormorant
- Guatemalan flicker
- Guatemalan motmot
- Guatemalan tyrannulet
- Guayaquil woodpecker
- Guianan brownlet
- Guianan cock-of-the-rock
- Guianan gnatcatcher
- Guianan puffbird
- Guianan red cotinga
- Guianan schiffornis
- Guianan streaked antwren
- Guianan toucanet
- Guianan trogon
- Guianan tyrannulet
- Guianan warbling antbird
- Guianan woodcreeper
- Guinea turaco
- Guira cuckoo
- Guira tanager
- Güldenstädt's redstart
- Gull-billed tern
- Gundlach's hawk
- Gunnison grouse
- Gurney's eagle
- Gurney's pitta
- Gurney's sugarbird
- Guttulate foliage-gleaner
- Gyrfalcon

== H ==
- Hadada ibis
- Hainan blue flycatcher
- Hainan leaf warbler
- Hainan partridge
- Hainan peacock-pheasant
- Hair-crested drongo
- Hairy woodpecker
- Hairy-backed bulbul
- Hairy-breasted barbet
- Hairy-crested antbird
- Half-collared kingfisher
- Half-collared sparrow
- Hall's babbler
- Halmahera boobook
- Halmahera cuckooshrike
- Halmahera flowerpecker
- Halmahera golden bulbul
- Halmahera paradise kingfisher
- Halmahera paradise-crow
- Hamerkop
- Hammond's flycatcher
- Handsome flycatcher
- Handsome fruiteater
- Handsome spurfowl
- Handsome sunbird
- Hangnest tody-tyrant
- Happy wren
- Hardhead
- Harlequin antbird
- Harlequin duck
- Harlequin quail
- Harpy eagle
- Harris's hawk
- Harris's sparrow
- Hartert's camaroptera
- Hartert's leaf warbler
- Hartlaub's babbler
- Hartlaub's bustard
- Hartlaub's duck
- Hartlaub's gull
- Hartlaub's spurfowl
- Hartlaub's turaco
- Harwood's spurfowl
- Hauxwell's thrush
- Hawaiʻi ʻākepa
- Hawaiʻi ʻamakihi
- Hawaiʻi creeper
- Hawaiʻi ʻelepaio
- †Hawaii mamo
- †Hawaiʻi ʻōʻō
- Hawaiian coot
- Hawaiian crow
- Hawaiian duck
- Hawaiian hawk
- Hawaiian petrel
- †Hawaiian rail
- Hawfinch
- †Hawkins's rail
- Hazel grouse
- Hazel-fronted pygmy tyrant
- Heart-spotted woodpecker
- Heermann's gull
- Heinroth's shearwater
- Hellmayr's pipit
- Helmet vanga
- Helmeted curassow
- Helmeted friarbird
- Helmeted guineafowl
- Helmeted hornbill
- Helmeted manakin
- Helmeted myna
- Helmeted pygmy tyrant
- Helmeted woodpecker
- Hemprich's hornbill
- Hen harrier
- Henderson crake
- Henderson fruit dove
- Henderson petrel
- Henderson reed warbler
- Henna-capped foliage-gleaner
- Henna-hooded foliage-gleaner
- Henslow's sparrow
- Henst's goshawk
- Hepatic tanager
- Herald petrel
- Herero chat
- Hermit thrush
- Hermit warbler
- Hermit wood wren
- Heuglin's bustard
- Heuglin's masked weaver
- Heuglin's spurfowl
- Heuglin's wheatear
- Highland elaenia
- Highland guan
- Highland lark
- Highland rush warbler
- Highland tinamou
- Hildebrandt's spurfowl
- Hildebrandt's starling
- Hill blue flycatcher
- Hill partridge
- Hill pigeon
- Hill prinia
- Hill swallow
- Himalayan beautiful rosefinch
- Himalayan black-lored tit
- Himalayan bluetail
- Himalayan bulbul
- Himalayan buzzard
- Himalayan cuckoo
- Himalayan cutia
- Himalayan flameback
- Himalayan monal
- Himalayan owl
- Himalayan prinia
- Himalayan quail
- Himalayan rubythroat
- Himalayan shortwing
- Himalayan snowcock
- Himalayan swiftlet
- Himalayan thrush
- Himalayan vulture
- Himalayan white-browed rosefinch
- Himalayan woodpecker
- Hinde's babbler
- Hispaniolan amazon
- Hispaniolan crossbill
- Hispaniolan elaenia
- Hispaniolan emerald
- Hispaniolan euphonia
- Hispaniolan lizard cuckoo
- Hispaniolan mango
- Hispaniolan nightjar
- Hispaniolan oriole
- Hispaniolan palm crow
- Hispaniolan parakeet
- Hispaniolan pewee
- Hispaniolan spindalis
- Hispaniolan trogon
- Hispaniolan woodpecker
- Hoary puffleg
- Hoary-headed grebe
- Hoary-throated barwing
- Hoary-throated spinetail
- Hoatzin
- Hodgson's frogmouth
- Hodgson's hawk-cuckoo
- Hodgson's redstart
- Hodgson's treecreeper
- Hoffmann's woodpecker
- Hoffmanns's woodcreeper
- Holub's golden weaver
- Honduran emerald
- Honeyguide greenbul
- Hooded antpitta
- Hooded berryeater
- Hooded butcherbird
- Hooded crane
- Hooded cuckooshrike
- Hooded gnateater
- Hooded grebe
- Hooded grosbeak
- Hooded jewel-babbler
- Hooded mannikin
- Hooded merganser
- Hooded monarch
- Hooded mountain tanager
- Hooded mountain toucan
- Hooded oriole
- Hooded parrot
- Hooded pitohui
- Hooded plover
- Hooded robin
- Hooded siskin
- Hooded tanager
- Hooded tinamou
- Hooded treepie
- Hooded visorbearer
- Hooded vulture
- Hooded warbler
- Hooded wheatear
- Hooded whistler
- Hooded yellowthroat
- Hook-billed bulbul
- Hook-billed hermit
- Hook-billed kingfisher
- Hook-billed kite
- Hook-billed vanga
- †Hoopoe starling
- Horned coot
- Horned curassow
- Horned grebe
- Horned guan
- Horned lark
- Horned parakeet
- Horned puffin
- Horned screamer
- Horned sungem
- Horsfield's babbler
- Horsfield's bronze cuckoo
- Horus swift
- Hose's broadbill
- House bunting
- House crow
- House finch
- House sparrow
- Huallaga tanager
- Huambo cisticola
- Huayco tinamou
- Hudson's black tyrant
- Hudson's canastero
- Hudsonian godwit
- Hudsonian whimbrel
- Huet's fulvetta
- †Huia
- Humaita antbird
- Humblot's flycatcher
- Humblot's heron
- Humblot's sunbird
- Humboldt penguin
- Humboldt's sapphire
- Hume's boobook
- Hume's bush warbler
- Hume's leaf warbler
- Hume's short-toed lark
- Hume's treecreeper
- Hume's wheatear
- Hume's white-eye
- Hunter's cisticola
- Hunter's sunbird
- Huon astrapia
- Huon melidectes
- Hutton's shearwater
- Hutton's vireo
- Hyacinth macaw
- Hyacinth visorbearer
- Hylocitrea

== I ==
- Iago sparrow
- Ibadan malimbe
- Ibera seedeater
- Iberian chiffchaff
- Iberian green woodpecker
- Iberian grey shrike
- Iberian magpie
- Ibisbill
- Iceland gull
- Icterine greenbul
- Icterine warbler
- Ihering's antwren
- ʻIʻiwi
- Ijima's leaf warbler
- Imeri warbling antbird
- Imitator goshawk
- Imperial amazon
- Imperial shag
- Imperial snipe
- Imperial woodpecker
- Inaccessible Island finch
- Inaccessible Island rail
- Inagua woodstar
- Inambari woodcreeper
- Inca dove
- Inca flycatcher
- Inca tern
- Inca wren
- Indian black-lored tit
- Indian blackbird
- Indian blue robin
- Indian bush lark
- Indian cormorant
- Indian courser
- Indian cuckoo
- Indian cuckooshrike
- Indian eagle-owl
- Indian golden oriole
- Indian grassbird
- Indian grey hornbill
- Indian nightjar
- Indian nuthatch
- Indian paradise flycatcher
- Indian peafowl
- Indian pied myna
- Indian pitta
- Indian pond heron
- Indian robin
- Indian roller
- Indian scimitar babbler
- Indian scops owl
- Indian silverbill
- Indian skimmer
- Indian spot-billed duck
- Indian spotted creeper
- Indian spotted eagle
- Indian stone-curlew
- Indian swiftlet
- Indian vulture
- Indian white-eye
- Indian yellow-nosed albatross
- Indigo bunting
- Indigo flowerpiercer
- Indigo flycatcher
- Indigo-banded kingfisher
- Indigo-capped hummingbird
- Indochinese barbet
- Indochinese blue flycatcher
- Indochinese bush lark
- Indochinese cuckooshrike
- Indochinese fulvetta
- Indochinese green magpie
- Indochinese roller
- Indochinese yuhina
- Indonesian serin
- Inland dotterel
- Inland thornbill
- Inti tanager
- Invisible rail
- Iphis monarch
- Iquitos gnatcatcher
- Iranian ground jay
- Iraq babbler
- Iringa akalat
- Iriomote tit
- Iris lorikeet
- Isabela oriole
- Isabelline bush-hen
- Isabelline shrike
- Isabelline wheatear
- Island bronze-naped pigeon
- Island imperial pigeon
- Island leaf warbler
- Island monarch
- Island scrub jay
- Island whistler
- Islet kingfisher
- Isthmian wren
- Italian sparrow
- Itatiaia spinetail
- Itombwe owl
- Ituri batis
- Ivory gull
- Ivory-backed woodswallow
- Ivory-billed aracari
- Ivory-billed coucal
- Ivory-billed woodcreeper
- Ivory-billed woodpecker
- Ivory-breasted pitta
- Izu robin
- Izu thrush

== J ==
- Jabiru
- Jack snipe
- Jackal buzzard
- Jackson's hornbill
- Jackson's spurfowl
- Jackson's widowbird
- Jacky winter
- Jacobin cuckoo
- Jalca tapaculo
- Jamaican becard
- Jamaican blackbird
- Jamaican crow
- Jamaican elaenia
- Jamaican euphonia
- Jamaican lizard cuckoo
- Jamaican mango
- Jamaican oriole
- Jamaican owl
- Jamaican petrel
- Jamaican pewee
- Jamaican poorwill
- Jamaican spindalis
- Jamaican tody
- Jamaican vireo
- Jamaican woodpecker
- Jambandu indigobird
- Jambu fruit dove
- James's flamingo
- Jameson's antpecker
- Jameson's firefinch
- Jameson's snipe
- Jameson's wattle-eye
- Jandaya parakeet
- Jankowski's bunting
- Japanese accentor
- Japanese bush warbler
- Japanese cormorant
- Japanese green woodpecker
- Japanese grosbeak
- Japanese leaf warbler
- Japanese murrelet
- Japanese night heron
- Japanese pygmy woodpecker
- Japanese quail
- Japanese robin
- Japanese scops owl
- Japanese sparrowhawk
- Japanese thrush
- Japanese wagtail
- Japanese waxwing
- Java sparrow
- Javan banded pitta
- Javan black-capped babbler
- Javan blue flycatcher
- Javan blue robin
- Javan blue-banded kingfisher
- Javan bulbul
- Javan bush warbler
- Javan cochoa
- Javan flameback
- Javan flowerpecker
- Javan forktail
- Javan frogmouth
- Javan fulvetta
- Javan green magpie
- Javan hawk-eagle
- Javan heleia
- Javan kingfisher
- Javan lapwing
- Javan leafbird
- Javan munia
- Javan myna
- Javan oriole
- Javan owlet
- Javan pied myna
- Javan plover
- Javan pond heron
- Javan scimitar babbler
- Javan scops owl
- Javan shortwing
- Javan sunbird
- Javan tesia
- Javan trogon
- Javan whistling thrush
- Javan white-eye
- Javan woodcock
- Jelski's black tyrant
- Jelski's chat-tyrant
- Jerdon's babbler
- Jerdon's baza
- Jerdon's bush chat
- Jerdon's bush lark
- Jerdon's courser
- Jerdon's leafbird
- Jerdon's minivet
- Jerdon's nightjar
- Jet antbird
- Jet manakin
- Jobi manucode
- Jocotoco antpitta
- Johanna's sunbird
- Johannes's tody-tyrant
- Jonquil parrot
- Jos Plateau indigobird
- Josephine's lorikeet
- Jouanin's petrel
- Joyful greenbul
- Juan Fernández firecrown
- Juan Fernández petrel
- Juan Fernandez tit-tyrant
- Juba weaver
- Jungle babbler
- Jungle bush quail
- Jungle myna
- Jungle nightjar
- Jungle owlet
- Jungle prinia
- Junin antpitta
- Junín canastero
- Junin grebe
- Junin tapaculo
- Juniper titmouse

== K ==
- Kabobo apalis
- Kadavu fantail
- Kadavu honeyeater
- Kaempfer's tody-tyrant
- Kaempfer's woodpecker
- Kafa white-eye
- Kagu
- Kai Besar white-eye
- Kai cicadabird
- Kai Kecil white-eye
- Kai monarch
- Kākāpō
- †Kākāwahie
- Kalahari scrub robin
- Kalao blue flycatcher
- Kalij pheasant
- Kalinago wren
- Kalkadoon grasswren
- †Kamao
- Kamchatka leaf warbler
- Kandt's waxbill
- Kangean shama
- Kangean tit-babbler
- Karamoja apalis
- Karimui owlet-nightjar
- Karoo chat
- Karoo eremomela
- Karoo korhaan
- Karoo lark
- Karoo long-billed lark
- Karoo prinia
- Karoo scrub robin
- Karoo thrush
- Karthala scops owl
- Karthala white-eye
- Kashmir flycatcher
- Kashmir nutcracker
- Kashmir nuthatch
- Katanga masked weaver
- †Kauaʻi ʻakialoa
- Kauaʻi ʻamakihi
- Kauaʻi ʻelepaio
- †Kauaʻi nukupuʻu
- †Kauaʻi ʻōʻōbraccatus
- Kawall's amazon
- Kea
- Keel-billed motmot
- Keel-billed toucan
- Kelp goose
- Kelp gull
- Kemp's longbill
- Kenrick's starling
- Kentish plover
- Kentucky warbler
- Kenya sparrow
- Kerguelen petrel
- Kerguelen tern
- Kermadec petrel
- Key West quail-dove
- Kidepo lark
- Kikau
- Kikuyu mountain greenbul
- Kikuyu white-eye
- Kilifi weaver
- Killdeer
- Kilombero cisticola
- Kilombero weaver
- Kimberley honeyeater
- King bird-of-paradise
- King eider
- King of Saxony bird-of-paradise
- King penguin
- King quail
- King rail
- King vulture
- Kinglet calyptura
- Kinglet manakin
- †Kioea
- Kipengere seedeater
- †Kiritimati sandpiper
- Kirk's white-eye
- Kirtland's warbler
- Kittlitz's murrelet
- Kittlitz's plover
- Klaas's cuckoo
- Klages's antbird
- Klages's antwren
- Kloss's leaf warbler
- Knob-billed duck
- Knob-billed fruit dove
- Knobbed hornbill
- Knysna turaco
- Knysna warbler
- Knysna woodpecker
- Koepcke's hermit
- Koepcke's screech owl
- Kofiau monarch
- Kofiau paradise kingfisher
- Koklass pheasant
- Kolombangara leaf warbler
- Kolombangara monarch
- Kolombangara white-eye
- †Kona grosbeak
- Kordofan lark
- Kordofan sparrow
- Kori bustard
- †Kosrae crake
- Kosrae fruit dove
- †Kosrae starling
- Kosrae white-eye
- Kozlov's accentor
- Kretschmer's longbill
- Krüper's nuthatch
- Kuhl's lorikeet
- Kungwe apalis
- Kurdish wheatear
- Kurrichane thrush

== L ==
- La Sagra's flycatcher
- La Selle thrush
- †Labrador duck
- Laced woodpecker
- Lacrimose mountain tanager
- Ladder-backed woodpecker
- Ladder-tailed nightjar
- Lady Amherst's pheasant
- Lafresnaye's piculet
- Lafresnaye's vanga
- Lagden's bushshrike
- Laggar falcon
- Lake duck
- †Lānaʻi hookbill
- Lance-tailed manakin
- Lanceolated monklet
- Lanceolated warbler
- Lanner falcon
- Lapland longspur
- Lappet-faced vulture
- Large blue flycatcher
- Large elaenia
- Large fig parrot
- Large frogmouth
- Large green pigeon
- Large grey babbler
- Large ground finch
- Large hawk-cuckoo
- Large Lifou white-eye
- Large niltava
- Large rock martin
- Large scimitar babbler
- Large scrubwren
- Large tree finch
- Large woodshrike
- Large wren-babbler
- Large-billed antwren
- Large-billed crow
- Large-billed gerygone
- Large-billed lark
- Large-billed leaf warbler
- Large-billed reed warbler
- Large-billed scrubwren
- Large-billed seed finch
- Large-billed tern
- Large-footed finch
- Large-footed tapaculo
- Large-headed flatbill
- Large-tailed antshrike
- Large-tailed nightjar
- Lark bunting
- Lark sparrow
- Lark-like brushrunner
- Lark-like bunting
- Larwo shama
- Latham's francolin
- Latham's snipe
- Lattice-tailed trogon
- Laughing dove
- Laughing falcon
- Laughing gull
- Laughing kookaburra
- †Laughing owl
- Laura's woodland warbler
- Laurel pigeon
- Lava gull
- Lava heron
- Lavender waxbill
- Lawes's parotia
- Lawrence's goldfinch
- Lawrence's thrush
- Layard's parakeet
- Layard's warbler
- Laysan albatross
- Laysan duck
- Laysan finch
- †Laysan honeycreeper
- †Laysan rail
- Lazuli bunting
- Lazuli kingfisher
- Lazuline sabrewing
- Leach's storm petrel
- Leaden antwren
- Leaden flycatcher
- Leaden honeyeater
- Leaf lorikeet
- Leaf-love
- Lear's macaw
- Least auklet
- Least bittern
- Least flycatcher
- Least grebe
- Least honeyguide
- Least nighthawk
- Least poorwill
- Least sandpiper
- Least seedsnipe
- Least storm petrel
- Least tern
- LeConte's sparrow
- LeConte's thrasher
- Legge's flowerpecker
- Legge's hawk-eagle
- Lemon dove
- Lemon-bellied crombec
- Lemon-bellied flyrobin
- Lemon-bellied tufted flycatcher
- Lemon-bellied white-eye
- Lemon-breasted canary
- Lemon-browed flycatcher
- Lemon-chested greenlet
- Lemon-rumped warbler
- Lemon-spectacled tanager
- Lemon-throated barbet
- Lemon-throated leaf warbler
- Lesser adjutant
- †Lesser ʻakialoa
- Lesser Antillean bullfinch
- Lesser Antillean euphonia
- Lesser Antillean flycatcher
- Lesser Antillean pewee
- Lesser Antillean saltator
- Lesser Antillean swift
- Lesser Antillean tanager
- Lesser bird-of-paradise
- Lesser black-backed gull
- Lesser blue-eared starling
- Lesser coucal
- Lesser crested tern
- Lesser cuckoo
- Lesser cuckooshrike
- Lesser elaenia
- Lesser fish eagle
- Lesser flamingo
- Lesser florican
- Lesser frigatebird
- Lesser goldfinch
- Lesser grass finch
- Lesser green leafbird
- Lesser greenlet
- Lesser grey shrike
- Lesser ground cuckoo
- Lesser ground robin
- Lesser honeyguide
- Lesser hoopoe-lark
- Lesser hornero
- Lesser jacana
- Lesser kestrel
- Lesser kiskadee
- †Lesser koa finch
- Lesser lophorina
- Lesser masked weaver
- Lesser melampitta
- Lesser moorhen
- Lesser necklaced laughingthrush
- Lesser nighthawk
- Lesser noddy
- Lesser nothura
- Lesser prairie chicken
- Lesser racket-tailed drongo
- Lesser rhea
- Lesser roadrunner
- Lesser scaup
- Lesser seedcracker
- Lesser shortwing
- Lesser shrike-tyrant
- Lesser spotted eagle
- Lesser spotted woodpecker
- Lesser striped swallow
- Lesser swallow-tailed swift
- Lesser swamp warbler
- Lesser vasa parrot
- Lesser violetear
- Lesser wagtail-tyrant
- Lesser whistling duck
- Lesser white-fronted goose
- Lesser whitethroat
- Lesser woodcreeper
- Lesser yellow-headed vulture
- Lesser yellowlegs
- Lesser yellownape
- Lesson's motmot
- Lesson's seedeater
- Letitia's thorntail
- Letter-winged kite
- Lettered aracari
- Levaillant's cisticola
- Levaillant's cuckoo
- Levaillant's woodpecker
- Levant sparrowhawk
- Lewin's honeyeater
- Lewin's rail
- Lewis's woodpecker
- Lichtenstein's sandgrouse
- Lidth's jay
- Light-crowned spinetail
- Light-mantled albatross
- Light-vented bulbul
- Lilac-breasted roller
- Lilac-crowned amazon
- Lilac-crowned fruit dove
- Lilac-tailed parrotlet
- Lilacine amazon
- Lilian's lovebird
- Limestone leaf warbler
- Limpkin
- Lina's sunbird
- Linchi swiftlet
- Lincoln's sparrow
- Line-cheeked spinetail
- Line-fronted canastero
- Lineated barbet
- Lineated foliage-gleaner
- Lineated woodpecker
- Lined antshrike
- Lined forest falcon
- Lined quail-dove
- Lined seedeater
- Lita woodpecker
- Little auk
- Little bee-eater
- Little bittern
- Little black cormorant
- Little blue heron
- Little bronze cuckoo
- Little brown bustard
- Little bunting
- Little bustard
- Little buttonquail
- Little chachalaca
- Little corella
- Little cormorant
- Little crake
- Little crow
- Little cuckoo
- Little cuckoo-dove
- Little curlew
- Little eagle
- Little egret
- Little forktail
- Little friarbird
- Little grassbird
- Little grebe
- Little green pigeon
- Little green sunbird
- Little greenbul
- Little grey flycatcher
- Little grey greenbul
- Little grey woodpecker
- Little ground tyrant
- Little gull
- Little hermit
- Little heron
- Little Inca finch
- Little kingfisher
- Little lorikeet
- Little minivet
- Little nightjar
- Little owl
- Little paradise kingfisher
- Little penguin
- Little pied cormorant
- Little pied flycatcher
- Little raven
- Little ringed plover
- Little rock thrush
- Little rush warbler
- Little shearwater
- Little shrikethrush
- Little slaty flycatcher
- Little sparrowhawk
- Little spiderhunter
- Little spotted kiwi
- Little stint
- Little Sumba boobook
- Little swift
- Little tern
- Little thornbird
- Little tinamou
- Little wattlebird
- Little weaver
- Little white tern
- Little wood rail
- Little woodpecker
- Little woodstar
- Little woodswallow
- Little yellow flycatcher
- Littoral rock thrush
- Livingstone's flycatcher
- Livingstone's turaco
- Lizard buzzard
- Loango weaver
- Locust finch
- Loggerhead kingbird
- Loggerhead shrike
- Loja tapaculo
- Lompobattang flycatcher
- Lompobattang leaf warbler
- Long-bearded honeyeater
- Long-billed bernieria
- Long-billed bush warbler
- Long-billed corella
- Long-billed crombec
- Long-billed crow
- Long-billed cuckoo
- Long-billed curlew
- Long-billed dowitcher
- Long-billed forest warbler
- Long-billed hermit
- Long-billed honeyeater
- Long-billed murrelet
- Long-billed myzomela
- Long-billed partridge
- Long-billed pipit
- Long-billed plover
- Long-billed spiderhunter
- Long-billed starthroat
- Long-billed thrasher
- Long-billed thrush
- Long-billed white-eye
- Long-billed woodcreeper
- Long-billed wren
- Long-billed wren-babbler
- Long-crested eagle
- Long-crested myna
- Long-crested pygmy tyrant
- Long-eared owl
- Long-legged buzzard
- Long-legged pipit
- Long-legged thicketbird
- Long-tailed broadbill
- Long-tailed bush warbler
- Long-tailed cinclodes
- Long-tailed cisticola
- Long-tailed duck
- Long-tailed fantail
- Long-tailed finch
- Long-tailed fiscal
- Long-tailed glossy starling
- Long-tailed ground dove
- Long-tailed ground roller
- Long-tailed hawk
- Long-tailed hermit
- Long-tailed honey buzzard
- Long-tailed jaeger
- Long-tailed koel
- Long-tailed manakin
- Long-tailed meadowlark
- Long-tailed minivet
- Long-tailed mockingbird
- Long-tailed myna
- Long-tailed nightjar
- Long-tailed paradigalla
- Long-tailed paradise whydah
- Long-tailed parakeet
- Long-tailed potoo
- Long-tailed reed finch
- Long-tailed rosefinch
- Long-tailed shrike
- Long-tailed sibia
- Long-tailed silky-flycatcher
- Long-tailed starling
- Long-tailed sylph
- Long-tailed tapaculo
- Long-tailed thrush
- Long-tailed tit
- Long-tailed triller
- Long-tailed tyrant
- Long-tailed widowbird
- Long-tailed wood partridge
- Long-tailed woodnymph
- Long-toed lapwing
- Long-toed stint
- Long-trained nightjar
- Long-tufted screech owl
- Long-wattled umbrellabird
- Long-whiskered owlet
- Long-winged antwren
- Long-winged harrier
- Longuemare's sunangel
- Lord Derby's parakeet
- †Lord Howe gerygone
- Lord Howe woodhen
- Lorentz's whistler
- Loria's satinbird
- Loten's sunbird
- Louisiade fantail
- Louisiade flowerpecker
- Louisiade monarch
- Louisiade pitta
- Louisiade whistler
- Louisiade white-eye
- Louisiana waterthrush
- Lovely cotinga
- Lovely fairywren
- Lovely sunbird
- Loveridge's sunbird
- Lowland akalat
- Lowland masked apalis
- Lowland peltops
- Lowland sooty boubou
- Lowland tiny greenbul
- Lowland white-eye
- Luapula cisticola
- Lucifer sheartail
- Lucy's warbler
- Ludwig's bustard
- Ludwig's double-collared sunbird
- Lufira masked weaver
- Lühder's bushshrike
- Lulu's tody-flycatcher
- Lunulated antbird
- Luzon bleeding-heart
- Luzon boobook
- Luzon buttonquail
- Luzon flameback
- Luzon hornbill
- Luzon island thrush
- Luzon scops owl
- Luzon striped babbler
- Luzon water redstart
- †Lyall's wren
- Lynes's cisticola
- Lyre-tailed honeyguide
- Lyre-tailed nightjar

== M ==
- Maasai apalis
- Macaroni penguin
- Maccoa duck
- MacGillivray's prion
- MacGillivray's warbler
- MacGregor's bowerbird
- MacGregor's honeyeater
- Mackinnon's shrike
- Macleay's honeyeater
- Madagascar blue pigeon
- Madagascar blue vanga
- Madagascar buttonquail
- Madagascar buzzard
- Madagascar cisticola
- Madagascar cuckoo
- Madagascar cuckoo-hawk
- Madagascar cuckooshrike
- Madagascar fish eagle
- Madagascar flufftail
- Madagascar forest rail
- Madagascar grebe
- Madagascar green pigeon
- Madagascar harrier-hawk
- Madagascar hoopoe
- Madagascar ibis
- Madagascar jacana
- Madagascar lark
- Madagascar magpie-robin
- Madagascar mannikin
- Madagascar martin
- Madagascar nightjar
- Madagascar owl
- Madagascar partridge
- Madagascar plover
- Madagascar pochard
- Madagascar pratincole
- Madagascar pygmy kingfisher
- Madagascar rail
- Madagascar sandgrouse
- Madagascar scops owl
- Madagascar serpent eagle
- Madagascar snipe
- Madagascar sparrowhawk
- Madagascar spinetail
- Madagascar starling
- Madagascar swamp warbler
- Madagascar wagtail
- Madagascar yellowbrow
- Madanga
- Madarasz's tiger parrot
- Madeira chaffinch
- Madeira firecrest
- Magdalena antbird
- Magdalena tapaculo
- Magellanic diving petrel
- Magellanic horned owl
- Magellanic oystercatcher
- Magellanic penguin
- Magellanic plover
- Magellanic snipe
- Magellanic tapaculo
- Magellanic woodpecker
- Magenta petrel
- Magenta-throated woodstar
- Maghreb magpie
- Maghreb wheatear
- Magnificent bird-of-paradise
- Magnificent frigatebird
- Magnificent riflebird
- Magnificent sunbird
- Magnolia warbler
- Magpie goose
- Magpie mannikin
- Magpie shrike
- Magpie starling
- Magpie tanager
- Magpie-lark
- Maguari stork
- Makatea fruit dove
- Makira cicadabird
- Makira dwarf kingfisher
- Makira fantail
- Makira flycatcher
- Makira honeyeater
- Makira leaf warbler
- Makira owl
- Makira starling
- Makira thrush
- Makira white-eye
- Makira woodhen
- Malabar barbet
- Malabar flameback
- Malabar grey hornbill
- Malabar imperial pigeon
- Malabar lark
- Malabar pied hornbill
- Malabar trogon
- Malabar whistling thrush
- Malabar woodshrike
- Malachite kingfisher
- Malachite sunbird
- Malagasy black swift
- Malagasy brush warbler
- Malagasy bulbul
- Malagasy coucal
- Malagasy green sunbird
- Malagasy harrier
- Malagasy kestrel
- Malagasy kingfisher
- Malagasy palm swift
- Malagasy paradise flycatcher
- Malagasy pond heron
- Malagasy sacred ibis
- Malagasy turtle dove
- Malagasy white-eye
- Malaita cicadabird
- Malaita fantail
- Malaita monarch
- Malaita owl
- Malaita white-eye
- Malawi batis
- Malayan banded pitta
- Malayan black magpie
- Malayan black-capped babbler
- Malayan blue flycatcher
- Malayan blue-banded kingfisher
- Malayan brown barbet
- Malayan crested fireback
- Malayan crestless fireback
- Malayan eared nightjar
- Malayan forktail
- Malayan hawk-cuckoo
- Malayan honeyguide
- Malayan laughingthrush
- Malayan night heron
- Malayan peacock-pheasant
- Malaysian crested argus
- Malaysian cuckooshrike
- Malaysian partridge
- Malaysian plover
- Malaysian whistling thrush
- Maleo
- Mali firefinch
- Malia
- Malindi pipit
- Mallard
- Mallee emu-wren
- Malleefowl
- Mamberamo sunbird
- Manchurian bush warbler
- Manchurian reed warbler
- Mandarin duck
- Maned duck
- Maned owl
- †Mangareva reed warbler
- Mangrove blue flycatcher
- Mangrove cuckoo
- Mangrove fantail
- Mangrove finch
- Mangrove gerygone
- Mangrove golden whistler
- Mangrove honeyeater
- Mangrove hummingbird
- Mangrove kingfisher
- Mangrove pitta
- Mangrove rail
- Mangrove robin
- Mangrove sunbird
- Mangrove swallow
- Mangrove vireo
- Mangrove warbler
- Mangrove whistler
- Manicoré warbling antbird
- Manipur bush quail
- Manipur fulvetta
- Mantanani scops owl
- Mantled hawk
- Manu antbird
- Manu parrotlet
- Manus boobook
- Manus brush cuckoo
- Manus dwarf kingfisher
- Manus fantail
- Manus friarbird
- Manus monarch
- Manx shearwater
- Many-banded aracari
- Many-colored bushshrike
- Many-colored Chaco finch
- Many-colored rush tyrant
- Many-coloured fruit dove
- Many-spotted hummingbird
- Many-striped canastero
- Mao
- Maquis canastero
- Marabou stork
- Maracaibo tody-flycatcher
- Marail guan
- Maranon antshrike
- Marañón crescentchest
- Marañón gnatcatcher
- Maranon pigeon
- Marañón sparrow
- Marañón spinetail
- Marañón thrush
- Maranon tyrannulet
- Maratua shama
- Marble-faced bristle tyrant
- Marbled duck
- Marbled frogmouth
- Marbled godwit
- Marbled honeyeater
- Marbled murrelet
- Marbled wood quail
- Marbled wren-babbler
- Marcapata spinetail
- Margaret's batis
- Mariana crow
- Mariana fruit dove
- Mariana kingfisher
- Mariana swiftlet
- †Marianne white-eye
- Marico flycatcher
- Marico sunbird
- Marigold lorikeet
- Markham's storm petrel
- Marmora's warbler
- Maroon oriole
- Maroon shining parrot
- Maroon woodpecker
- Maroon-backed accentor
- Maroon-backed whistler
- Maroon-bellied parakeet
- Maroon-belted chat-tyrant
- Maroon-breasted philentoma
- Maroon-chested ground dove
- Maroon-fronted parrot
- Maroon-naped sunbird
- Maroon-tailed parakeet
- Marquesan ground dove
- Marquesan kingfisher
- Marquesan monarch
- †Marquesan swamphen
- Marsh antwren
- Marsh babbler
- Marsh grassbird
- Marsh owl
- Marsh sandpiper
- Marsh seedeater
- Marsh tapaculo
- Marsh tchagra
- Marsh tit
- Marsh warbler
- Marsh widowbird
- Marshall's iora
- Martens's warbler
- Martial eagle
- Martinique oriole
- Martinique thrasher
- Marvelous spatuletail
- Masafuera rayadito
- Masatierra petrel
- †Mascarene coot
- †Mascarene grey parakeet
- Mascarene martin
- Mascarene paradise flycatcher
- †Mascarene parrot
- Mascarene petrel
- Mascarene swiftlet
- †Mascarene teal
- Masked antpitta
- Masked booby
- Masked bowerbird
- Masked bunting
- Masked cardinal
- Masked crimson tanager
- Masked duck
- Masked finch
- Masked finfoot
- Masked fruiteater
- Masked gnatcatcher
- Masked lapwing
- Masked lark
- Masked laughingthrush
- Masked mountain tanager
- Masked saltator
- Masked shining parrot
- Masked shrike
- Masked tanager
- Masked tityra
- Masked trogon
- Masked water tyrant
- Masked woodswallow
- Masked yellowthroat
- Matinan blue flycatcher
- Mato Grosso antbird
- Matsudaira's storm petrel
- †Maui ʻakepa
- Maui ʻalauahio
- †Maui Nui ʻakialoa
- †Maui nukupuʻu
- Maui parrotbill
- †Mauke starling
- †Maupiti monarch
- †Mauritius blue pigeon
- Mauritius bulbul
- Mauritius cuckooshrike
- Mauritius fody
- Mauritius grey white-eye
- Mauritius kestrel
- †Mauritius night heron
- Mauritius olive white-eye
- †Mauritius scops owl
- †Mauritius sheldgoose
- Maxwell's black weaver
- Mayan antthrush
- Mayotte drongo
- Mayotte scops owl
- Mayotte sunbird
- Mayotte white-eye
- Mayr's forest rail
- Mayr's honeyeater
- Mayr's swiftlet
- Mbulu white-eye
- McConnell's flycatcher
- McConnell's spinetail
- McGregor's cuckooshrike
- McKay's bunting
- Meadow bunting
- Meadow pipit
- Mealy amazon
- Mediterranean flycatcher
- Mediterranean gull
- Mediterranean shearwater
- Mediterranean short-toed lark
- Medium egret
- Medium ground finch
- Medium tree finch
- Meek's lorikeet
- Meek's pygmy parrot
- Mees's nightjar
- Mekong wagtail
- Melancholy woodpecker
- Melanesian flycatcher
- Melanesian kingfisher
- Melanesian megapode
- Melanesian whistler
- Meller's duck
- Melodious babbler
- Melodious blackbird
- Melodious lark
- Melodious warbler
- Menetries's warbler
- Mentawai malkoha
- Mentawai scops owl
- Meratus blue flycatcher
- Meratus white-eye
- Mérida flowerpiercer
- Mérida sunangel
- Mérida tapaculo
- Mérida wren
- Merlin
- Metallic pigeon
- Metallic starling
- Metallic-green tanager
- Metallic-winged sunbird
- Meves's starling
- Mewing kingfisher
- Mexican cacique
- Mexican chickadee
- Mexican duck
- Mexican hermit
- Mexican jay
- Mexican motmot
- Mexican parrotlet
- Mexican sheartail
- Mexican squirrel cuckoo
- Mexican violetear
- Mexican whip-poor-will
- Mexican woodnymph
- Meyer's friarbird
- Meyer's goshawk
- Meyer's parrot
- Micronesian imperial pigeon
- Micronesian megapode
- Micronesian myzomela
- Micronesian rufous fantail
- Micronesian starling
- Mid-mountain berrypecker
- Middendorff's grasshopper warbler
- Middle American screech owl
- Middle spotted woodpecker
- Midget flowerpecker
- Mikado pheasant
- Military macaw
- Milky stork
- Millerbird
- Mimic honeyeater
- Minahasa hooded pitta
- Minahasa masked owl
- Minas Gerais tyrannulet
- Mindanao bleeding-heart
- Mindanao blue fantail
- Mindanao boobook
- Mindanao brown dove
- Mindanao cuckooshrike
- Mindanao heleia
- Mindanao hornbill
- Mindanao island thrush
- Mindanao lorikeet
- Mindanao miniature babbler
- Mindanao pygmy babbler
- Mindanao racket-tail
- Mindanao scops owl
- Mindanao serin
- Mindoro bleeding-heart
- Mindoro boobook
- Mindoro bulbul
- Mindoro cuckooshrike
- Mindoro hornbill
- Mindoro imperial pigeon
- Mindoro island thrush
- Mindoro racket-tail
- Mindoro scops owl
- Minute hermit
- Miombo pied barbet
- Miombo rock thrush
- Miombo scrub robin
- Miombo tit
- Miombo wren-warbler
- Mishana tyrannulet
- Mishmi wren-babbler
- Mississippi kite
- Mistle thrush
- Mistletoe tyrannulet
- Mistletoebird
- Mitred parakeet
- Mocking cliff chat
- Modest tiger parrot
- Moheli brush warbler
- Moheli bulbul
- Moheli scops owl
- Moltoni's warbler
- Moluccan brush cuckoo
- Moluccan cuckooshrike
- Moluccan drongo-cuckoo
- Moluccan dwarf kingfisher
- Moluccan eclectus
- Moluccan flycatcher
- Moluccan goshawk
- Moluccan hanging parrot
- Moluccan island thrush
- Moluccan king parrot
- Moluccan megapode
- Moluccan monarch
- Moluccan myzomela
- Moluccan owlet-nightjar
- Moluccan scops owl
- Moluccan starling
- Moluccan swiftlet
- Moluccan woodcock
- Mombasa woodpecker
- Mongolian finch
- Mongolian ground jay
- Mongolian gull
- Mongolian lark
- Mongolian short-toed lark
- Monk parakeet
- Monotonous lark
- Montagu's harrier
- Montane foliage-gleaner
- Montane nightjar
- Montane racket-tail
- Montane tiny greenbul
- Montane widowbird
- Montane woodcreeper
- Monte yellow finch
- Monteiro's bushshrike
- Monteiro's hornbill
- Monteiro's storm petrel
- Montezuma oropendola
- Montezuma quail
- Montserrat oriole
- Moorea reed warbler
- †Moorea sandpiper
- Moorland chat
- Moorland francolin
- Moreau's sunbird
- Morelet's seedeater
- Moreno's ground dove
- Morepork
- Morningbird
- Morotai friarbird
- Morotai paradise kingfisher
- Morotai white-eye
- Mosque swallow
- Moss-backed sparrow
- Moss-backed tanager
- Mossy-nest swiftlet
- Mottle-backed elaenia
- Mottle-breasted honeyeater
- Mottle-cheeked tyrannulet
- Mottled berryhunter
- Mottled duck
- Mottled flowerpecker
- Mottled mannikin
- Mottled owl
- Mottled petrel
- Mottled piculet
- Mottled spinetail
- Mottled swift
- Mottled wood owl
- Mount Cameroon speirops
- Mount Cameroon spurfowl
- Mount Kupe bushshrike
- Mount Victoria babax
- Mountain avocetbill
- Mountain bamboo partridge
- Mountain barbet
- Mountain blackeye
- Mountain bluebird
- Mountain bulbul
- Mountain buzzard
- Mountain cacique
- Mountain caracara
- Mountain chat
- Mountain chickadee
- Mountain chiffchaff
- Mountain elaenia
- Mountain firetail
- Mountain fulvetta
- Mountain hawk-eagle
- Mountain honeyeater
- Mountain illadopsis
- Mountain imperial pigeon
- Mountain kingfisher
- Mountain leaf warbler
- Mountain masked apalis
- Mountain mouse-warbler
- Mountain myzomela
- Mountain oriole
- Mountain owlet-nightjar
- Mountain parakeet
- Mountain peacock-pheasant
- Mountain peltops
- Mountain pipit
- Mountain plover
- Mountain quail
- Mountain robin
- Mountain robin-chat
- Mountain saw-wing
- Mountain scops owl
- Mountain serpent eagle
- Mountain shrike
- Mountain sooty boubou
- Mountain starling
- Mountain swiftlet
- Mountain tailorbird
- Mountain thornbill
- Mountain thrush
- Mountain trogon
- Mountain velvetbreast
- Mountain wagtail
- Mountain wren
- Mountain wren-babbler
- Mountain yellow warbler
- Mournful long-tailed woodcreeper
- Mourning collared dove
- Mourning dove
- Mourning sierra finch
- Mourning warbler
- Mourning wheatear
- Mouse-colored antshrike
- Mouse-colored thistletail
- Mouse-colored tyrannulet
- Mouse-coloured penduline tit
- Mouse-coloured tapaculo
- Mouse-gray flycatcher
- Moussier's redstart
- Moustached antpitta
- Moustached antwren
- Moustached babbler
- Moustached barbet
- Moustached brushfinch
- Moustached flowerpiercer
- Moustached grass warbler
- Moustached hawk-cuckoo
- Moustached kingfisher
- Moustached laughingthrush
- Moustached puffbird
- Moustached tinkerbird
- Moustached treeswift
- Moustached turca
- Moustached warbler
- Moustached woodcreeper
- Moustached wren
- Mrs. Gould's sunbird
- Mrs. Hume's pheasant
- Mugimaki flycatcher
- Muisca antpitta
- Mulga parrot
- Multicoloured tanager
- Munchique wood wren
- Murphy's petrel
- Muscovy duck
- Musician wren
- Musk duck
- Musk lorikeet
- Mussau fantail
- Mussau flycatcher
- Mussau monarch
- Mussau triller
- Mute swan

== N ==
- Nacunda nighthawk
- Naga wren-babbler
- Nahan's partridge
- Naked-faced barbet
- Naked-faced spiderhunter
- Namaqua dove
- Namaqua sandgrouse
- Namaqua warbler
- Namuli apalis
- Nanday parakeet
- Nankeen kestrel
- Nankeen night heron
- Napo sabrewing
- Narcissus flycatcher
- Narcondam hornbill
- Naretha bluebonnet
- Narina trogon
- Nariño tapaculo
- Narrow-billed antwren
- Narrow-billed tody
- Narrow-billed woodcreeper
- Narrow-tailed emerald
- Narrow-tailed starling
- Nashville warbler
- Natal spurfowl
- Natewa silktail
- Natterer's slaty antshrike
- Naumann's thrush
- Naung Mung scimitar babbler
- Nauru reed warbler
- Nava's wren
- Nazca booby
- Neblina metaltail
- Neblina tapaculo
- Nechisar nightjar
- Necklaced barbet
- Necklaced spinetail
- Necklaced woodpecker
- Neddicky
- Needle-billed hermit
- Neergaard's sunbird
- Negros bleeding-heart
- Negros fruit dove
- Negros leaf warbler
- Negros scops owl
- Negros striped babbler
- Nelicourvi weaver
- Nelson's sparrow
- Nendo whistler
- Nene
- Neotropic cormorant
- Nepal cupwing
- Nepal fulvetta
- Nepal house martin
- Neumann's starling
- Neumann's warbler
- New Britain boobook
- New Britain bronzewing
- New Britain dwarf kingfisher
- New Britain friarbird
- New Britain goshawk
- New Britain sparrowhawk
- New Britain thicketbird
- New Britain thrush
- New Caledonian buttonquail
- New Caledonian crow
- New Caledonian cuckooshrike
- New Caledonian friarbird
- New Caledonian island thrush
- New Caledonian kakariki
- New Caledonian lorikeet
- New Caledonian myzomela
- New Caledonian nightjar
- New Caledonian owlet-nightjar
- New Caledonian rail
- New Caledonian storm petrel
- New Caledonian streaked fantail
- New Caledonian thicketbird
- New Caledonian whistler
- New Georgia dwarf kingfisher
- New Guinea bronzewing
- New Guinea flightless rail
- New Guinea scrubfowl
- New Guinea thornbill
- New Guinea woodcock
- New Hanover mannikin
- New Holland honeyeater
- New Ireland boobook
- New Ireland dwarf kingfisher
- New Ireland friarbird
- New Ireland myzomela
- New Zealand bellbird
- †New Zealand bittern
- New Zealand falcon
- New Zealand fantail
- New Zealand fernbird
- New Zealand grebe
- New Zealand kākā
- New Zealand king shag
- †New Zealand merganser
- New Zealand pigeon
- New Zealand pipit
- New Zealand plover
- †New Zealand quail
- New Zealand rockwren
- New Zealand scaup
- New Zealand storm petrel
- Newell's shearwater
- †Newton's parakeet
- Newton's sunbird
- Niam-Niam parrot
- Nicaraguan grackle
- Nicaraguan seed finch
- Niceforo's wren
- Nicholson's pipit
- Nicobar bulbul
- Nicobar hooded pitta
- Nicobar imperial pigeon
- Nicobar jungle flycatcher
- Nicobar megapode
- Nicobar parakeet
- Nicobar pigeon
- Nicobar scops owl
- Nicobar sparrowhawk
- Night parrot
- Nightingale Island finch
- †Nightingale reed warbler
- Nīhoa finch
- Nile Valley sunbird
- Nilgiri blue robin
- Nilgiri flowerpecker
- Nilgiri flycatcher
- Nilgiri laughingthrush
- Nilgiri pipit
- Nilgiri thrush
- Nilgiri wood pigeon
- Nimba flycatcher
- Nkulengu rail
- Noble snipe
- Nocturnal curassow
- Noisy friarbird
- Noisy miner
- Noisy pitta
- Noisy scrubbird
- Nonggang babbler
- Nordmann's greenshank
- Norfolk gerygone
- †Norfolk ground dove
- †Norfolk kākā
- Norfolk parakeet
- Norfolk robin
- Noronha elaenia
- Noronha vireo
- North Island brown kiwi
- North Island kōkako
- †North Island piopio
- North Island robin
- North Island saddleback
- †North Island snipe
- †North Island takahē
- North Melanesian cuckooshrike
- North Moluccan cicadabird
- North Moluccan pitta
- North Solomons dwarf kingfisher
- Northern bald ibis
- Northern barred woodcreeper
- Northern beardless tyrannulet
- Northern bentbill
- Northern black flycatcher
- Northern black korhaan
- Northern blue jewel-babbler
- Northern bobwhite
- Northern boobook
- Northern brown-throated weaver
- Northern brownbul
- Northern cardinal
- Northern carmine bee-eater
- Northern cassowary
- Northern chestnut-breasted wren
- Northern chestnut-tailed antbird
- Northern crombec
- Northern double-collared sunbird
- Northern emerald toucanet
- Northern fantail
- Northern fiscal
- Northern fish owl
- Northern flicker
- Northern forktail
- Northern fulmar
- Northern gannet
- Northern giant hummingbird
- Northern giant petrel
- Northern grey-headed sparrow
- Northern grosbeak-canary
- Northern harrier
- Northern hawk-cuckoo
- Northern hawk-owl
- Northern house wren
- Northern jacana
- Northern lapwing
- Northern Marquesan reed warbler
- Northern masked weaver
- Northern mockingbird
- Northern nightingale-wren
- Northern nutcracker
- Northern parula
- Northern pied babbler
- Northern pintail
- Northern plain xenops
- Northern potoo
- Northern puffback
- Northern pygmy owl
- Northern raven
- Northern red bishop
- Northern red-billed hornbill
- Northern red-fronted tinkerbird
- Northern rockhopper penguin
- Northern rosella
- Northern rough-winged swallow
- Northern royal albatross
- Northern saw-whet owl
- Northern schiffornis
- Northern screamer
- Northern scrub flycatcher
- Northern scrub robin
- Northern shoveler
- Northern shrike
- Northern shriketit
- Northern silvery kingfisher
- Northern slaty antshrike
- Northern sooty woodpecker
- Northern tropical pewee
- Northern variable pitohui
- Northern waterthrush
- Northern wheatear
- Northern white-crowned shrike
- Northern white-faced owl
- Northern white-fringed antwren
- Northern yellow white-eye
- Nubian bustard
- Nubian nightjar
- Nubian woodpecker
- Nuku Hiva imperial pigeon
- †Nuku Hiva monarch
- Nullarbor quail-thrush
- Numfor leaf warbler
- Numfor paradise kingfisher
- Nuthatch vanga
- Nuttall's woodpecker
- Nutting's flycatcher
- Nyanza swift

== O ==
- †Oʻahu ʻākepa
- †Oʻahu ʻakialoa
- Oʻahu ʻalauahio
- Oʻahu ʻamakihi
- Oʻahu ʻelepaio
- †Oʻahu nukupuʻu
- †Oʻahu ʻōʻō
- Oak titmouse
- Oasis hummingbird
- Oaxaca hummingbird
- Oaxaca sparrow
- Obbia lark
- Oberholser's fruit dove
- Oberländer's ground thrush
- Obi cicadabird
- Obi golden bulbul
- Obi paradise kingfisher
- Obi paradise-crow
- Obscure berrypecker
- Obscure honeyeater
- †Oceanic eclectus
- Ocellated antbird
- Ocellated crake
- Ocellated piculet
- Ocellated poorwill
- Ocellated quail
- Ocellated tapaculo
- Ocellated thrasher
- Ocellated turkey
- Ocellated woodcreeper
- Ochraceous attila
- Ochraceous bulbul
- Ochraceous pewee
- Ochraceous piculet
- Ochraceous wren
- Ochraceous-breasted flycatcher
- Ochre-backed woodpecker
- Ochre-bellied boobook
- Ochre-bellied dove
- Ochre-bellied flycatcher
- Ochre-bellied kingfisher
- Ochre-breasted antpitta
- Ochre-breasted brushfinch
- Ochre-breasted catbird
- Ochre-breasted foliage-gleaner
- Ochre-breasted pipit
- Ochre-breasted tanager
- Ochre-browed thistletail
- Ochre-cheeked spinetail
- Ochre-collared monarch
- Ochre-collared piculet
- Ochre-crowned brownlet
- Ochre-faced tody-flycatcher
- Ochre-flanked tapaculo
- Ochre-fronted antpitta
- Ochre-lored flatbill
- Ochre-marked parakeet
- Ochre-naped ground tyrant
- Ochre-rumped antbird
- Ochre-rumped bunting
- Ochre-striped antpitta
- Ochre-throated foliage-gleaner
- Ogea monarch
- Oilbird
- Okarito kiwi
- Okinawa rail
- Okinawa robin
- Okinawa woodpecker
- Oleaginous hemispingus
- Olivaceous elaenia
- Olivaceous flycatcher
- Olivaceous greenlet
- Olivaceous piculet
- Olivaceous piha
- Olivaceous siskin
- Olivaceous thornbill
- Olivaceous woodcreeper
- Olive bee-eater
- Olive bulbul
- Olive bushshrike
- Olive finch
- Olive flyrobin
- Olive honeyeater
- Olive ibis
- Olive long-tailed cuckoo
- Olive manakin
- Olive oropendola
- Olive sparrow
- Olive spinetail
- Olive straightbill
- Olive sunbird
- Olive thrush
- Olive tufted flycatcher
- Olive warbler
- Olive whistler
- Olive woodpecker
- Olive-backed euphonia
- Olive-backed flowerpecker
- Olive-backed foliage-gleaner
- Olive-backed forest robin
- Olive-backed oriole
- Olive-backed pipit
- Olive-backed quail-dove
- Olive-backed tailorbird
- Olive-backed tanager
- Olive-backed woodcreeper
- Olive-backed woodpecker
- Olive-bellied sunbird
- Olive-capped coua
- Olive-capped flowerpecker
- Olive-capped warbler
- Olive-chested flycatcher
- Olive-colored white-eye
- Olive-crowned crescentchest
- Olive-crowned flowerpecker
- Olive-crowned yellowthroat
- Olive-faced flatbill
- Olive-flanked ground robin
- Olive-green camaroptera
- Olive-green tanager
- Olive-green tyrannulet
- Olive-grey saltator
- Olive-headed greenbul
- Olive-headed lorikeet
- Olive-headed weaver
- Olive-naped weaver
- Olive-sided flycatcher
- Olive-spotted hummingbird
- Olive-striped flycatcher
- Olive-throated parakeet
- Olive-tree warbler
- Olive-winged bulbul
- Olomaʻo
- Olrog's cinclodes
- Olrog's gull
- †Olson's petrel
- Omani owl
- ʻŌmaʻo
- One-colored becard
- Opal-crowned manakin
- Opal-crowned tanager
- Opal-rumped tanager
- Opalton grasswren
- Orange bullfinch
- Orange chat
- Orange dove
- Orange ground thrush
- Orange oriole
- Orange River francolin
- Orange River white-eye
- Orange weaver
- Orange-backed troupial
- Orange-backed woodpecker
- Orange-banded flycatcher
- Orange-bellied antwren
- Orange-bellied euphonia
- Orange-bellied flowerpecker
- Orange-bellied fruit dove
- Orange-bellied leafbird
- Orange-bellied manakin
- Orange-bellied parrot
- Orange-billed babbler
- Orange-billed lorikeet
- Orange-billed nightingale-thrush
- Orange-billed sparrow
- Orange-breasted bunting
- Orange-breasted bushshrike
- Orange-breasted falcon
- Orange-breasted forest robin
- Orange-breasted fruiteater
- Orange-breasted green pigeon
- Orange-breasted laughingthrush
- Orange-breasted sunbird
- Orange-breasted thornbird
- Orange-breasted trogon
- Orange-breasted waxbill
- Orange-browed hemispingus
- Orange-cheeked honeyeater
- Orange-cheeked parrot
- Orange-cheeked waxbill
- Orange-chinned parakeet
- Orange-collared manakin
- Orange-crested flycatcher
- Orange-crested manakin
- Orange-crowned euphonia
- Orange-crowned fairywren
- Orange-crowned oriole
- Orange-crowned warbler
- Orange-eared tanager
- Orange-eyed flatbill
- Orange-eyed thornbird
- Orange-footed scrubfowl
- Orange-fronted barbet
- Orange-fronted fruit dove
- Orange-fronted hanging parrot
- Orange-fronted kakariki
- Orange-fronted parakeet
- Orange-fronted plushcrown
- Orange-fronted yellow finch
- Orange-headed tanager
- Orange-headed thrush
- Orange-necked partridge
- Orange-sided thrush
- Orange-spotted bulbul
- Orange-throated sunangel
- Orange-throated tanager
- Orange-tufted spiderhunter
- Orange-tufted sunbird
- Orange-winged amazon
- Orange-winged pytilia
- Orangequit
- Orchard oriole
- Oriental bay owl
- Oriental cuckoo
- Oriental cuckooshrike
- Oriental darter
- Oriental dollarbird
- Oriental greenfinch
- Oriental hobby
- Oriental magpie
- Oriental magpie-robin
- Oriental pied hornbill
- Oriental plover
- Oriental pratincole
- Oriental reed warbler
- Oriental scops owl
- Oriental skylark
- Oriental stork
- Oriental turtle dove
- Oriente warbler
- Orinoco goose
- Orinoco piculet
- Orinoco saltator
- Orinoco softtail
- Oriole blackbird
- Oriole finch
- Oriole warbler
- Oriole whistler
- Ornate flycatcher
- Ornate fruit dove
- Ornate hawk-eagle
- Ornate lorikeet
- Ornate melidectes
- Ornate pitta
- Ornate stipplethroat
- Ornate sunbird
- Ornate tinamou
- Ortolan bunting
- Osprey
- †ʻŌʻū
- Oustalet's sunbird
- Oustalet's tyrannulet
- Outcrop sabrewing
- Ouvea parakeet
- Ovambo sparrowhawk
- Ovenbird
- Owston's tit
- Oxapampa antpitta

== P ==
- Pacific antwren
- Pacific baza
- Pacific beardless tyrannulet
- Pacific black duck
- Pacific elaenia
- Pacific emerald dove
- Pacific flatbill
- Pacific golden plover
- Pacific gull
- Pacific hornero
- Pacific imperial pigeon
- Pacific kingfisher
- Pacific koel
- Pacific loon
- Pacific parakeet
- Pacific parrotlet
- Pacific pygmy owl
- Pacific reef heron
- Pacific robin
- Pacific screech owl
- Pacific swallow
- Pacific tuftedcheek
- Pacific wren
- Paddyfield pipit
- Paddyfield warbler
- †Pagan reed warbler
- Paint-billed crake
- Painted bunting
- Painted bush quail
- Painted buttonquail
- Painted finch
- Painted francolin
- Painted honeyeater
- Painted manakin
- Painted parakeet
- Painted quail-thrush
- Painted sandgrouse
- Painted spurfowl
- Painted stork
- Painted tiger parrot
- Painted tody-flycatcher
- Painted whitestart
- Palani laughingthrush
- Palau bush warbler
- Palau cicadabird
- Palau fantail
- Palau flycatcher
- Palau fruit dove
- Palau ground dove
- Palau nightjar
- Palau scops owl
- Palau swiftlet
- Palawan blue flycatcher
- Palawan bulbul
- Palawan crow
- Palawan drongo
- Palawan fairy-bluebird
- Palawan flowerpecker
- Palawan flycatcher
- Palawan frogmouth
- Palawan hornbill
- Palawan peacock-pheasant
- Palawan scops owl
- Palawan striped babbler
- Palawan sunbird
- Palawan tit
- Palawan tit-babbler
- Pale batis
- Pale baywing
- Pale blue flycatcher
- Pale chanting goshawk
- Pale cicadabird
- Pale crag martin
- Pale flycatcher
- Pale martin
- Pale mountain pigeon
- Pale prinia
- Pale rockfinch
- Pale rosefinch
- Pale spiderhunter
- Pale thrush
- Pale white-eye
- Pale-bellied hermit
- Pale-bellied mourner
- Pale-bellied myna
- Pale-bellied tapaculo
- Pale-bellied tyrant-manakin
- Pale-bellied white-eye
- Pale-billed antpitta
- Pale-billed flowerpecker
- Pale-billed hornbill
- Pale-billed parrotbill
- Pale-billed scrubwren
- Pale-billed sicklebill
- Pale-billed woodpecker
- Pale-blue monarch
- Pale-breasted illadopsis
- Pale-breasted spinetail
- Pale-breasted thrush
- Pale-browed tinamou
- Pale-browed treehunter
- Pale-capped pigeon
- Pale-chinned flycatcher
- Pale-crested woodpecker
- Pale-crowned cisticola
- Pale-edged flycatcher
- Pale-eyed blackbird
- Pale-eyed bulbul
- Pale-eyed pygmy tyrant
- Pale-eyed thrush
- Pale-faced bare-eye
- Pale-faced bulbul
- Pale-footed bush warbler
- Pale-footed swallow
- Pale-fronted nigrita
- Pale-headed brushfinch
- Pale-headed jacamar
- Pale-headed munia
- Pale-headed rosella
- Pale-headed woodpecker
- Pale-legged hornero
- Pale-legged leaf warbler
- Pale-legged warbler
- Pale-mandibled aracari
- Pale-naped brushfinch
- Pale-olive greenbul
- Pale-rumped swift
- Pale-shouldered cicadabird
- Pale-tailed barbthroat
- Pale-tailed canastero
- Pale-throated greenbul
- Pale-throated wren-babbler
- Pale-tipped inezia
- Pale-vented bush-hen
- Pale-vented pigeon
- Pale-vented thrush
- Pale-winged starling
- Pale-winged trumpeter
- Pale-yellow robin
- Palestine sunbird
- Palila
- Pallas's fish eagle
- Pallas's grasshopper warbler
- Pallas's gull
- Pallas's leaf warbler
- Pallas's reed bunting
- Pallas's rosefinch
- Pallas's sandgrouse
- Pallid cuckoo
- Pallid dove
- Pallid harrier
- Pallid honeyguide
- Pallid scops owl
- Pallid spinetail
- Pallid swift
- Palm cockatoo
- Palm lorikeet
- Palm tanager
- Palm warbler
- Palm-nut vulture
- Palmchat
- Pampa finch
- Pampas meadowlark
- Pampas pipit
- Panama beardless tyrannulet
- Panama flycatcher
- Panama tyrannulet
- Panao antpitta
- Panay striped babbler
- Pangani longclaw
- Pantanal snipe
- Pantepui thrush
- Paperbark flycatcher
- Papuan babbler
- Papuan black myzomela
- Papuan boobook
- Papuan dwarf kingfisher
- Papuan eagle
- Papuan eclectus
- Papuan frogmouth
- Papuan grassbird
- Papuan harrier
- Papuan hawk-owl
- Papuan island thrush
- Papuan king parrot
- Papuan logrunner
- Papuan mountain pigeon
- Papuan nightjar
- Papuan paradise kingfisher
- Papuan parrotfinch
- Papuan pitta
- Papuan scrub robin
- Papuan scrubwren
- Papuan sittella
- Papuan spinetail
- Papuan treecreeper
- Papuan whipbird
- Papuan white-eye
- Papyrus canary
- Papyrus gonolek
- Papyrus yellow warbler
- Para brownlet
- Para foliage-gleaner
- Para gnatcatcher
- Paradise drongo
- Paradise jacamar
- †Paradise parrot
- Paradise riflebird
- Paradise shelduck
- Paradise tanager
- Parakeet auklet
- Paramillo tapaculo
- Paramo ground tyrant
- Paramo horned owl
- Paramo pipit
- Paramo seedeater
- Paramo tapaculo
- Parasitic jaeger
- Pardusco
- Paria brushfinch
- Paria whitestart
- Parker's antbird
- Parker's spinetail
- Parodi's hemispingus
- Parrot crossbill
- Parrot-billed seedeater
- Parrot-billed sparrow
- Partridge pigeon
- †Passenger pigeon
- Patagonian canastero
- Patagonian forest earthcreeper
- Patagonian mockingbird
- Patagonian sierra finch
- Patagonian tinamou
- Patagonian tyrant
- Patagonian yellow finch
- Pauraque
- Pavonine cuckoo
- Pavonine quetzal
- Peaceful dove
- Peach-fronted parakeet
- Peacock coquette
- Pearl kite
- Pearl-breasted swallow
- Pearl-spotted owlet
- Pearled treerunner
- Pearly antshrike
- Pearly parakeet
- Pearly-bellied seedeater
- Pearly-breasted conebill
- Pearly-breasted cuckoo
- Pearly-eyed thrasher
- Pearly-vented tody-tyrant
- Pechora pipit
- Pectoral antwren
- Pectoral sandpiper
- Pectoral sparrow
- Pectoral-patch cisticola
- Peg-billed finch
- Pel's fishing owl
- Pelagic cormorant
- Peleng fantail
- Pelzeln's tody-tyrant
- Pemba green pigeon
- Pemba scops owl
- Pemba sunbird
- Pemba white-eye
- Penan bulbul
- Penan hawk-cuckoo
- Pennant-winged nightjar
- Père David's snowfinch
- Père David's tit
- Peregrine falcon
- Perija antpitta
- Perijá brushfinch
- Perijá metaltail
- Perija parakeet
- Perija starfrontlet
- Perijá tapaculo
- Perijá thistletail
- Pernambuco foliage-gleaner
- Pernambuco pygmy owl
- Persian shearwater
- Peruvian antpitta
- Peruvian booby
- Peruvian diving petrel
- Peruvian martin
- Peruvian meadowlark
- Peruvian pelican
- Peruvian piedtail
- Peruvian pipit
- Peruvian plantcutter
- Peruvian recurvebill
- Peruvian seaside cinclodes
- Peruvian sheartail
- Peruvian sierra finch
- Peruvian tern
- Peruvian thick-knee
- Peruvian treehunter
- Peruvian tyrannulet
- Peruvian warbling antbird
- Peruvian wren
- Pesquet's parrot
- Petit's cuckooshrike
- Pfrimer's parakeet
- Phainopepla
- Pharaoh eagle-owl
- Pheasant coucal
- Pheasant cuckoo
- Pheasant pigeon
- Pheasant-tailed jacana
- Philadelphia vireo
- Philby's partridge
- Philippa's crombec
- Philippine bulbul
- Philippine bush warbler
- Philippine bush-hen
- Philippine collared dove
- Philippine coucal
- Philippine cuckoo-dove
- Philippine drongo-cuckoo
- Philippine duck
- Philippine dwarf kingfisher
- Philippine eagle
- Philippine eagle-owl
- Philippine fairy-bluebird
- Philippine falconet
- Philippine frogmouth
- Philippine green pigeon
- Philippine hanging parrot
- Philippine hawk-cuckoo
- Philippine hawk-eagle
- Philippine honey buzzard
- Philippine jungle crow
- Philippine jungle flycatcher
- Philippine leaf warbler
- Philippine leafbird
- Philippine magpie-robin
- Philippine megapode
- Philippine nightjar
- Philippine oriole
- Philippine pied fantail
- Philippine pitta
- Philippine pygmy woodpecker
- Philippine scops owl
- Philippine serpent eagle
- Philippine shortwing
- Philippine spinetail
- Philippine swiftlet
- Philippine trogon
- Phoenix petrel
- Piapiac
- Picazuro pigeon
- Pictorella mannikin
- Picui ground dove
- Pied avocet
- Pied bronze cuckoo
- Pied bush chat
- Pied butcherbird
- Pied crow
- Pied cuckoo-dove
- Pied cuckooshrike
- Pied currawong
- Pied falconet
- Pied goshawk
- Pied harrier
- Pied heron
- Pied honeyeater
- Pied imperial pigeon
- Pied kingfisher
- Pied monarch
- Pied oystercatcher
- Pied plover
- Pied puffbird
- Pied shrike-babbler
- Pied starling
- Pied stilt
- Pied thrush
- Pied triller
- Pied water tyrant
- Pied wheatear
- Pied-billed grebe
- Pied-crested tit-tyrant
- Pied-winged swallow
- Pigeon guillemot
- Pilbara grasswren
- Pileated flycatcher
- Pileated parrot
- Pileated woodpecker
- Pilotbird
- Pin-striped tit-babbler
- Pin-tailed green pigeon
- Pin-tailed manakin
- Pin-tailed parrotfinch
- Pin-tailed sandgrouse
- Pin-tailed snipe
- Pin-tailed whydah
- Pincoya storm petrel
- Pine bunting
- Pine flycatcher
- Pine grosbeak
- Pine siskin
- Pine warbler
- Pink cockatoo
- Pink pigeon
- Pink robin
- Pink-backed pelican
- Pink-bellied imperial pigeon
- Pink-billed cnemoscopus
- Pink-billed lark
- Pink-billed parrotfinch
- Pink-breasted flowerpecker
- Pink-breasted lark
- Pink-browed rosefinch
- Pink-eared duck
- Pink-footed goose
- Pink-footed puffback
- Pink-footed shearwater
- Pink-headed duck
- Pink-headed fruit dove
- Pink-headed imperial pigeon
- Pink-headed warbler
- Pink-legged graveteiro
- Pink-legged rail
- Pink-necked green pigeon
- Pink-rumped rosefinch
- Pink-spotted fruit dove
- Pink-throated becard
- Pink-throated brilliant
- Pink-throated twinspot
- Pinnated bittern
- Pinon's imperial pigeon
- Pinsker's hawk-eagle
- Pintado petrel
- Pinto's spinetail
- Pinyon jay
- Piping bellbird
- Piping crow
- Piping hornbill
- Piping long-tailed woodcreeper
- Piping plover
- Pīpipi
- Piratic flycatcher
- Pirre chlorospingus
- Pirre hummingbird
- Pirre warbler
- Pitcairn reed warbler
- Pitt shag
- Pitta-like ground roller
- Piura chat-tyrant
- Piura hemispingus
- Plain antvireo
- Plain chachalaca
- Plain flowerpecker
- Plain gerygone
- Plain greenbul
- Plain honeyeater
- Plain inezia
- Plain laughingthrush
- Plain leaf warbler
- Plain mountain finch
- Plain nightjar
- Plain parakeet
- Plain pigeon
- Plain prinia
- Plain softtail
- Plain sunbird
- Plain swift
- Plain thornbird
- Plain white-eye
- Plain-backed antpitta
- Plain-backed pipit
- Plain-backed sparrow
- Plain-backed sunbird
- Plain-bellied emerald
- Plain-breasted ground dove
- Plain-breasted piculet
- Plain-brown woodcreeper
- Plain-capped starthroat
- Plain-colored seedeater
- Plain-colored tanager
- Plain-crested elaenia
- Plain-crowned spinetail
- Plain-flanked rail
- Plain-mantled tit-spinetail
- Plain-pouched hornbill
- Plain-tailed nighthawk
- Plain-tailed warbling finch
- Plain-tailed wren
- Plain-throated antwren
- Plain-winged antshrike
- Plain-winged antwren
- Plain-winged woodcreeper
- Plains lark
- Plains-wanderer
- Plaintive cuckoo
- Planalto foliage-gleaner
- Planalto hermit
- Planalto slaty antshrike
- Planalto tapaculo
- Planalto tyrannulet
- Planalto woodcreeper
- Plate-billed mountain toucan
- Plateau lark
- Plum-faced lorikeet
- Plum-headed finch
- Plum-headed parakeet
- Plum-throated cotinga
- Plumbeous antbird
- Plumbeous antvireo
- Plumbeous euphonia
- Plumbeous forest falcon
- Plumbeous hawk
- Plumbeous ibis
- Plumbeous kite
- Plumbeous pigeon
- Plumbeous rail
- Plumbeous seedeater
- Plumbeous sierra finch
- Plumbeous tyrant
- Plumbeous vireo
- Plumbeous warbler
- Plumbeous water redstart
- Plumbeous-backed thrush
- Plumbeous-crowned tyrannulet
- Plume-toed swiftlet
- Plumed egret
- Plumed guineafowl
- Plumed whistling duck
- Plush-crested jay
- Plushcap
- Pohnpei cicadabird
- Pohnpei fantail
- Pohnpei flycatcher
- Pohnpei kingfisher
- Pohnpei lorikeet
- Pohnpei starling
- Point-tailed palmcreeper
- Pollen's vanga
- Polynesian ground dove
- Polynesian imperial pigeon
- Polynesian starling
- Polynesian storm petrel
- Polynesian swiftlet
- Polynesian triller
- Polynesian wattled honeyeater
- Pomarine jaeger
- Pompadour cotinga
- †Poʻouli
- Powerful owl
- Powerful woodpecker
- Prairie falcon
- Prairie warbler
- Prairie willet
- Predicted antwren
- Preuss's cliff swallow
- Preuss's weaver
- Prevost's ground sparrow
- Prigogine's double-collared sunbird
- Prigogine's greenbul
- Prigogine's nightjar
- Princess parrot
- Princess Stephanie's astrapia
- Principe scops owl
- Príncipe seedeater
- Príncipe speirops
- Principe starling
- Príncipe sunbird
- Príncipe thrush
- Príncipe weaver
- Príncipe white-eye
- Pringle's puffback
- Pririt batis
- Prong-billed barbet
- Protea canary
- Prothonotary warbler
- Providence petrel
- Przevalski's finch
- Przevalski's nuthatch
- Przevalski's parrotbill
- Przevalski's partridge
- Przevalski's redstart
- Puaiohi
- Puerto Rican amazon
- Puerto Rican bullfinch
- Puerto Rican emerald
- Puerto Rican euphonia
- Puerto Rican flycatcher
- Puerto Rican lizard cuckoo
- Puerto Rican mango
- Puerto Rican nightjar
- Puerto Rican oriole
- Puerto Rican owl
- †Puerto Rican parakeet
- Puerto Rican spindalis
- Puerto Rican tanager
- Puerto Rican tody
- Puerto Rican vireo
- Puerto Rican woodpecker
- Puff-backed bulbul
- Puff-backed honeyeater
- Puff-throated babbler
- Puff-throated bulbul
- Pulitzer's longbill
- Puna ground tyrant
- Puna ibis
- Puna miner
- Puna pipit
- Puna plover
- Puna snipe
- Puna tapaculo
- Puna teal
- Puna thistletail
- Puna tinamou
- Puna yellow finch
- Puno antpitta
- Purple cochoa
- Purple finch
- Purple gallinule
- Purple grenadier
- Purple heron
- Purple honeycreeper
- Purple indigobird
- Purple martin
- Purple needletail
- Purple quail-dove
- Purple roller
- Purple sandpiper
- Purple starling
- Purple sunbird
- Purple swamphen
- Purple-backed fairywren
- Purple-backed sunbeam
- Purple-backed thornbill
- Purple-banded sunbird
- Purple-bearded bee-eater
- Purple-bellied lory
- Purple-bibbed whitetip
- Purple-breasted cotinga
- Purple-breasted sunbird
- Purple-capped fruit dove
- Purple-chested hummingbird
- Purple-collared woodstar
- Purple-crested turaco
- Purple-crowned fairy
- Purple-crowned fairywren
- Purple-crowned lorikeet
- Purple-crowned plovercrest
- Purple-gaped honeyeater
- Purple-headed starling
- Purple-naped lory
- Purple-naped spiderhunter
- Purple-rumped sunbird
- Purple-tailed imperial pigeon
- Purple-throated carib
- Purple-throated cotinga
- Purple-throated cuckooshrike
- Purple-throated euphonia
- Purple-throated fruitcrow
- Purple-throated mountaingem
- Purple-throated sunangel
- Purple-throated sunbird
- Purple-throated woodstar
- Purple-winged ground dove
- Purple-winged roller
- Purplish jacamar
- Purplish jay
- Purplish-backed jay
- Purplish-backed quail-dove
- Purplish-mantled tanager
- Purus jacamar
- Puvel's illadopsis
- Pycroft's petrel
- Pygmy antwren
- Pygmy batis
- Pygmy bushtit
- Pygmy cormorant
- Pygmy cuckooshrike
- Pygmy cupwing
- Pygmy eagle
- Pygmy falcon
- Pygmy flowerpecker
- Pygmy flycatcher
- Pygmy hanging parrot
- Pygmy heleia
- Pygmy longbill
- Pygmy lorikeet
- Pygmy nightjar
- Pygmy nuthatch
- Pygmy palm swift
- Pygmy sunbird
- Pygmy swiftlet
- Pyrrhuloxia

== Q ==
- Qilian bluetail
- Quail-plover
- Quailfinch
- Quailfinch indigobird
- Quebracho crested tinamou
- Queen Carola's parotia

== R ==
- Rachel's malimbe
- Racket-tailed roller
- Racket-tailed treepie
- Racket-tipped thorntail
- Radde's accentor
- Radde's warbler
- Radjah shelduck
- Raffles's malkoha
- Raggiana bird-of-paradise
- Raiatea fruit dove
- †Raiatea kakariki
- Rail-babbler
- Raimondi's yellow finch
- Rain quail
- Rainbow bee-eater
- Rainbow lorikeet
- Rainbow pitta
- Rainbow starfrontlet
- Rainbow-bearded thornbill
- Raja Ampat pitohui
- Rajah scops owl
- Rand's warbler
- Ranongga white-eye
- Rapa fruit dove
- Rapa shearwater
- Rarotonga monarch
- Rarotonga starling
- Raso lark
- Ratchet-tailed treepie
- Rattling cisticola
- Razor-billed curassow
- Razorbill
- Recurve-billed bushbird
- Red avadavat
- Red bird-of-paradise
- Red collared dove
- Red crossbill
- Red fody
- Red goshawk
- Red grouse
- Red junglefowl
- Red kite
- Red knot
- Red lark
- Red lory
- Red myzomela
- Red owl
- Red phalarope
- Red pileated finch
- †Red rail
- Red Sea cliff swallow
- Red shoveler
- Red siskin
- Red spurfowl
- Red warbler
- Red wattlebird
- Red weaver
- Red-and-black grosbeak
- Red-and-black thrush
- Red-and-blue lory
- Red-and-green macaw
- Red-and-white antpitta
- Red-and-white crake
- Red-and-white spinetail
- Red-and-yellow barbet
- Red-backed buttonquail
- Red-backed fairywren
- Red-backed flameback
- Red-backed kingfisher
- Red-backed mousebird
- Red-backed shrike
- Red-backed sierra finch
- Red-backed thrush
- Red-banded flowerpecker
- Red-banded fruiteater
- Red-bearded bee-eater
- Red-bellied fruit dove
- Red-bellied grackle
- Red-bellied macaw
- Red-bellied malimbe
- Red-bellied paradise flycatcher
- Red-bellied parrot
- Red-bellied woodpecker
- Red-billed blue magpie
- Red-billed brushturkey
- Red-billed buffalo weaver
- Red-billed chough
- Red-billed curassow
- Red-billed dwarf hornbill
- Red-billed emerald
- Red-billed firefinch
- Red-billed ground cuckoo
- Red-billed helmetshrike
- Red-billed leiothrix
- Red-billed malkoha
- Red-billed oxpecker
- Red-billed parrot
- Red-billed partridge
- Red-billed pied tanager
- Red-billed pigeon
- Red-billed pytilia
- Red-billed quelea
- Red-billed scimitar babbler
- Red-billed scythebill
- Red-billed spurfowl
- Red-billed starling
- Red-billed streamertail
- Red-billed teal
- Red-billed tropicbird
- Red-billed tyrannulet
- Red-billed woodcreeper
- Red-breasted chat
- Red-breasted coua
- Red-breasted flycatcher
- Red-breasted goose
- Red-breasted meadowlark
- Red-breasted merganser
- Red-breasted nuthatch
- Red-breasted paradise kingfisher
- Red-breasted parakeet
- Red-breasted partridge
- Red-breasted pygmy parrot
- Red-breasted sapsucker
- Red-breasted swallow
- Red-breasted toucan
- Red-browed amazon
- Red-browed finch
- Red-browed pardalote
- Red-browed treecreeper
- Red-capped cardinal
- Red-capped coua
- Red-capped crombec
- Red-capped flowerpecker
- Red-capped forest warbler
- Red-capped lark
- Red-capped manakin
- Red-capped myzomela
- Red-capped parrot
- Red-capped plover
- Red-capped robin
- Red-capped robin-chat
- Red-cheeked cordon-bleu
- Red-cheeked parrot
- Red-cheeked wattle-eye
- Red-chested buttonquail
- Red-chested cuckoo
- Red-chested flowerpecker
- Red-chested flufftail
- Red-chested owlet
- Red-chested sunbird
- Red-chested swallow
- Red-chinned lorikeet
- Red-cockaded woodpecker
- Red-collared babbler
- Red-collared lorikeet
- Red-collared myzomela
- Red-collared widowbird
- Red-collared woodpecker
- Red-cowled cardinal
- Red-cowled widowbird
- Red-crested cardinal
- Red-crested cotinga
- Red-crested korhaan
- Red-crested pochard
- Red-crested turaco
- Red-crowned amazon
- Red-crowned ant tanager
- Red-crowned barbet
- Red-crowned crane
- Red-crowned kakariki
- Red-crowned malimbe
- Red-crowned woodpecker
- Red-eared firetail
- Red-eared fruit dove
- Red-eared parrotfinch
- Red-eyed dove
- Red-eyed puffback
- Red-eyed scimitar babbler
- Red-eyed vireo
- Red-faced barbet
- Red-faced cisticola
- Red-faced cormorant
- Red-faced crimsonwing
- Red-faced crombec
- Red-faced guan
- Red-faced liocichla
- Red-faced malkoha
- Red-faced mousebird
- Red-faced parrot
- Red-faced spinetail
- Red-faced warbler
- Red-faced woodland warbler
- Red-fan parrot
- Red-flanked bluetail
- Red-flanked lorikeet
- Red-footed booby
- Red-footed falcon
- Red-fronted antpecker
- Red-fronted barbet
- Red-fronted coot
- Red-fronted coua
- Red-fronted lorikeet
- Red-fronted macaw
- Red-fronted parrot
- Red-fronted parrotlet
- Red-fronted prinia
- Red-fronted rosefinch
- Red-fronted serin
- Red-gartered coot
- Red-headed barbet
- Red-headed bluebill
- Red-headed bullfinch
- Red-headed bunting
- Red-headed finch
- Red-headed flameback
- Red-headed lovebird
- Red-headed malimbe
- Red-headed manakin
- Red-headed myzomela
- Red-headed quelea
- Red-headed tanager
- Red-headed trogon
- Red-headed vulture
- Red-headed weaver
- Red-headed woodpecker
- Red-hooded tanager
- Red-keeled flowerpecker
- Red-kneed dotterel
- Red-knobbed coot
- Red-knobbed imperial pigeon
- Red-legged cormorant
- Red-legged crake
- Red-legged honeycreeper
- Red-legged kittiwake
- Red-legged partridge
- Red-legged seriema
- Red-legged tinamou
- Red-lored amazon
- Red-lored whistler
- Red-mantled rosefinch
- Red-masked parakeet
- †Red-moustached fruit dove
- Red-naped bushshrike
- Red-naped fruit dove
- Red-naped ibis
- Red-naped sapsucker
- Red-naped trogon
- Red-necked amazon
- Red-necked aracari
- Red-necked avocet
- Red-necked buzzard
- Red-necked crake
- Red-necked falcon
- Red-necked grebe
- Red-necked nightjar
- Red-necked phalarope
- Red-necked spurfowl
- Red-necked stint
- Red-necked tanager
- Red-necked woodpecker
- Red-pate cisticola
- Red-ruffed fruitcrow
- Red-rumped bush tyrant
- Red-rumped cacique
- Red-rumped parrot
- Red-rumped tinkerbird
- Red-rumped wheatear
- Red-rumped woodpecker
- Red-shouldered blackbird
- Red-shouldered cuckooshrike
- Red-shouldered hawk
- Red-shouldered macaw
- Red-shouldered spinetail
- Red-shouldered tanager
- Red-shouldered vanga
- Red-spectacled amazon
- Red-stained woodpecker
- Red-tailed amazon
- Red-tailed ant thrush
- Red-tailed black cockatoo
- Red-tailed bristlebill
- Red-tailed comet
- Red-tailed greenbul
- Red-tailed hawk
- Red-tailed laughingthrush
- Red-tailed minla
- Red-tailed newtonia
- Red-tailed shrike
- Red-tailed tropicbird
- Red-tailed vanga
- Red-tailed wheatear
- Red-thighed sparrowhawk
- Red-throated alethe
- Red-throated ant tanager
- Red-throated barbet
- Red-throated bee-eater
- Red-throated caracara
- Red-throated cliff swallow
- Red-throated loon
- Red-throated lorikeet
- Red-throated parrotfinch
- Red-throated piping guan
- Red-throated pipit
- Red-throated rock martin
- Red-throated sunbird
- Red-throated thrush
- Red-throated tit
- Red-throated twinspot
- Red-throated wryneck
- Red-tinged myzomela
- Red-vented barbet
- Red-vented bulbul
- Red-vented cockatoo
- Red-vented malimbe
- Red-vested myzomela
- Red-wattled lapwing
- Red-whiskered bulbul
- Red-winged blackbird
- Red-winged fairywren
- Red-winged francolin
- Red-winged grey warbler
- Red-winged lark
- Red-winged laughingthrush
- Red-winged parrot
- Red-winged prinia
- Red-winged pytilia
- Red-winged starling
- Red-winged tinamou
- Red-winged wood rail
- Reddish egret
- Reddish hermit
- Reddish myzomela
- Reddish scops owl
- Reddish-winged bare-eye
- Redhead
- Redpoll
- Redthroat
- Redwing
- Reed cormorant
- Reed parrotbill
- Reeves's pheasant
- Regal sunbird
- Regent bowerbird
- Regent honeyeater
- Regent parrot
- Regent whistler
- Reichard's seedeater
- Reichenbach's sunbird
- Reichenow's seedeater
- Reischek's kakariki
- Reiser's tyrannulet
- Relict gull
- Rennell fantail
- Rennell gerygone
- Rennell shrikebill
- Rennell starling
- Rennell whistler
- Rennell white-eye
- Resplendent quetzal
- Restinga tyrannulet
- Restless flycatcher
- Retz's helmetshrike
- Réunion bulbul
- Réunion cuckooshrike
- Réunion grey white-eye
- Réunion harrier
- †Réunion ibis
- †Réunion kestrel
- †Réunion night heron
- Réunion olive white-eye
- †Réunion rail
- †Réunion scops owl
- †Réunion sheldgoose
- Réunion stonechat
- Rhinoceros auklet
- Rhinoceros hornbill
- Ribbon-tailed astrapia
- Richard's pipit
- Ridgetop swiftlet
- Ridgway's hawk
- Ridgway's rail
- Rifleman
- Rimatara reed warbler
- Ring ouzel
- Ring-billed gull
- Ring-necked dove
- Ring-necked duck
- Ring-necked francolin
- Ring-tailed pigeon
- Ringed antpipit
- Ringed kingfisher
- Ringed storm petrel
- Ringed teal
- Ringed warbling finch
- Ringed woodpecker
- Rinjani scops owl
- Rio Branco antbird
- Rio de Janeiro antbird
- Rio de Janeiro antwren
- Rio Madeira stipplethroat
- Río Orinoco spinetail
- Rio Suno antwren
- Riparian antbird
- Riparian parrotlet
- River lapwing
- River prinia
- River tern
- River tyrannulet
- River warbler
- Riverbank warbler
- Riverside tyrant
- Riverside wren
- Rivoli's hummingbird
- Roadside hawk
- Roberts's warbler
- Robin accentor
- †Robust white-eye
- Robust woodpecker
- Rock bunting
- Rock bush quail
- Rock dove
- Rock earthcreeper
- Rock firefinch
- Rock kestrel
- Rock parrot
- Rock partridge
- Rock pratincole
- Rock ptarmigan
- Rock sandpiper
- Rock shag
- Rock sparrow
- Rock tapaculo
- Rock wren
- Rock-loving cisticola
- Rockefeller's sunbird
- Rockrunner
- Rockwarbler
- Rodrigues fody
- †Rodrigues night heron
- †Rodrigues parrot
- †Rodrigues pigeon
- †Rodrigues rail
- †Rodrigues scops owl
- †Rodrigues solitaire
- †Rodrigues starling
- Rodrigues warbler
- Roll's partridge
- Romblon boobook
- Rondônia bushbird
- Rondonia warbling antbird
- Rook
- Roraiman antbird
- Roraiman antwren
- Roraiman barbtail
- Roraiman flycatcher
- Roraiman nightjar
- Rose robin
- Rose-bellied bunting
- Rose-bellied chat
- Rose-breasted chat
- Rose-breasted grosbeak
- Rose-collared piha
- Rose-crowned fruit dove
- Rose-crowned parakeet
- Rose-faced parrot
- Rose-fronted parakeet
- Rose-ringed parakeet
- Rose-throated becard
- Rose-throated tanager
- Roseate spoonbill
- Roseate tern
- Ross's goose
- Ross's gull
- Ross's turaco
- Rossel cicadabird
- Rossel paradise kingfisher
- Rosy bee-eater
- Rosy minivet
- Rosy pipit
- Rosy starling
- Rosy thrush-tanager
- Rosy-billed pochard
- Rosy-faced lovebird
- Rosy-patched bushshrike
- Rosy-throated longclaw
- Rota white-eye
- Rote boobook
- Rote leaf warbler
- Rote myzomela
- Rothschild's swift
- Rotuma myzomela
- Rouget's rail
- Rough-crested malkoha
- Rough-legged buzzard
- Rough-legged tyrannulet
- Round-tailed manakin
- Roviana rail
- Royal cinclodes
- Royal parrotfinch
- Royal penguin
- Royal spoonbill
- Royal sunangel
- Royal tern
- Rubeho akalat
- Ruby-cheeked sunbird
- Ruby-crowned kinglet
- Ruby-crowned tanager
- Ruby-throated bulbul
- Ruby-throated hummingbird
- Ruby-throated myzomela
- Ruby-topaz hummingbird
- Rück's blue flycatcher
- Rudd's apalis
- Rudd's lark
- Ruddy crake
- Ruddy cuckoo-dove
- Ruddy duck
- Ruddy foliage-gleaner
- Ruddy ground dove
- Ruddy kingfisher
- Ruddy pigeon
- Ruddy quail-dove
- Ruddy shelduck
- Ruddy spinetail
- Ruddy tody-flycatcher
- Ruddy treerunner
- Ruddy turnstone
- Ruddy woodcreeper
- Ruddy-breasted crake
- Ruddy-breasted seedeater
- Ruddy-capped nightingale-thrush
- Ruddy-headed goose
- Ruddy-tailed flycatcher
- Rufescent antshrike
- Rufescent darkeye
- Rufescent flycatcher
- Rufescent imperial pigeon
- Rufescent prinia
- Rufescent screech owl
- Rufescent tiger heron
- Ruff
- Ruffed grouse
- Rufous babbler
- Rufous bristlebird
- Rufous casiornis
- Rufous chatterer
- Rufous cisticola
- Rufous coucal
- Rufous crab hawk
- Rufous fieldwren
- Rufous fishing owl
- Rufous flycatcher
- Rufous gnateater
- Rufous hornbill
- Rufous hornero
- Rufous hummingbird
- Rufous limestone babbler
- Rufous monarch
- Rufous motmot
- Rufous mourner
- Rufous nightjar
- Rufous owl
- Rufous paradise flycatcher
- Rufous piculet
- Rufous piha
- Rufous potoo
- Rufous sabrewing
- Rufous scrubbird
- Rufous sibia
- Rufous songlark
- Rufous spinetail
- Rufous treecreeper
- Rufous treepie
- Rufous twistwing
- Rufous vanga
- Rufous whistler
- Rufous woodpecker
- Rufous wren
- Rufous-and-white wren
- Rufous-backed antvireo
- Rufous-backed dwarf kingfisher
- Rufous-backed fantail
- Rufous-backed honeyeater
- Rufous-backed Inca finch
- Rufous-backed sibia
- Rufous-backed stipplethroat
- Rufous-backed thrush
- Rufous-backed wren
- Rufous-banded honeyeater
- Rufous-banded miner
- Rufous-banded owl
- Rufous-bellied antwren
- Rufous-bellied bush tyrant
- Rufous-bellied chachalaca
- Rufous-bellied eagle
- Rufous-bellied euphonia
- Rufous-bellied helmetshrike
- Rufous-bellied heron
- Rufous-bellied kookaburra
- Rufous-bellied mountain tanager
- Rufous-bellied nighthawk
- Rufous-bellied niltava
- Rufous-bellied seedsnipe
- Rufous-bellied swallow
- Rufous-bellied thrush
- Rufous-bellied tit
- Rufous-bellied triller
- Rufous-bellied woodpecker
- Rufous-breasted accentor
- Rufous-breasted antpitta
- Rufous-breasted antthrush
- Rufous-breasted blue flycatcher
- Rufous-breasted bush robin
- Rufous-breasted chat-tyrant
- Rufous-breasted flycatcher
- Rufous-breasted hermit
- Rufous-breasted leaftosser
- Rufous-breasted piculet
- Rufous-breasted sabrewing
- Rufous-breasted sparrowhawk
- Rufous-breasted spinetail
- Rufous-breasted warbling finch
- Rufous-breasted wood quail
- Rufous-breasted wren
- Rufous-browed chat-tyrant
- Rufous-browed conebill
- Rufous-browed flycatcher
- Rufous-browed hemispingus
- Rufous-browed peppershrike
- Rufous-browed tyrannulet
- Rufous-browed wren
- Rufous-brown solitaire
- Rufous-capped antshrike
- Rufous-capped antthrush
- Rufous-capped babbler
- Rufous-capped brushfinch
- Rufous-capped lark
- Rufous-capped motmot
- Rufous-capped nunlet
- Rufous-capped spinetail
- Rufous-capped thornbill
- Rufous-capped warbler
- Rufous-cheeked laughingthrush
- Rufous-cheeked nightjar
- Rufous-cheeked tanager
- Rufous-chested dotterel
- Rufous-chested flycatcher
- Rufous-chested tanager
- Rufous-chinned laughingthrush
- Rufous-collared kingfisher
- Rufous-collared sparrow
- Rufous-collared thrush
- Rufous-crested coquette
- Rufous-crested tanager
- Rufous-crowned antpitta
- Rufous-crowned babbler
- Rufous-crowned bee-eater
- Rufous-crowned elaenia
- Rufous-crowned emu-wren
- Rufous-crowned eremomela
- Rufous-crowned greenlet
- Rufous-crowned laughingthrush
- Rufous-crowned prinia
- Rufous-crowned sparrow
- Rufous-crowned tody-flycatcher
- Rufous-eared brushfinch
- Rufous-eared warbler
- Rufous-faced antbird
- Rufous-faced antpitta
- Rufous-faced crake
- Rufous-faced warbler
- Rufous-flanked thrush
- Rufous-fronted antthrush
- Rufous-fronted babbler
- Rufous-fronted brownlet
- Rufous-fronted laughingthrush
- Rufous-fronted parakeet
- Rufous-fronted prinia
- Rufous-fronted tailorbird
- Rufous-fronted thornbird
- Rufous-fronted wood quail
- Rufous-gaped hillstar
- Rufous-gorgeted flycatcher
- Rufous-headed chachalaca
- Rufous-headed ground roller
- Rufous-headed parrotbill
- Rufous-headed pygmy tyrant
- Rufous-headed robin
- Rufous-headed tailorbird
- Rufous-headed tanager
- Rufous-headed woodpecker
- Rufous-legged owl
- Rufous-lored kingfisher
- Rufous-lored tyrannulet
- Rufous-margined antwren
- Rufous-naped bellbird
- Rufous-naped greenlet
- Rufous-naped ground tyrant
- Rufous-naped lark
- Rufous-naped tit
- Rufous-necked foliage-gleaner
- Rufous-necked hornbill
- Rufous-necked laughingthrush
- Rufous-necked puffbird
- Rufous-necked snowfinch
- Rufous-necked sparrowhawk
- Rufous-necked wood rail
- Rufous-rumped antwren
- Rufous-rumped foliage-gleaner
- Rufous-rumped lark
- Rufous-rumped seedeater
- Rufous-shafted woodstar
- Rufous-sided broadbill
- Rufous-sided crake
- Rufous-sided gerygone
- Rufous-sided honeyeater
- Rufous-sided scrub tyrant
- Rufous-sided warbling finch
- Rufous-tailed antbird
- Rufous-tailed antthrush
- Rufous-tailed attila
- Rufous-tailed babbler
- Rufous-tailed fantail
- Rufous-tailed flatbill
- Rufous-tailed flycatcher
- Rufous-tailed foliage-gleaner
- Rufous-tailed hawk
- Rufous-tailed hummingbird
- Rufous-tailed jacamar
- Rufous-tailed lark
- Rufous-tailed palm thrush
- Rufous-tailed plantcutter
- Rufous-tailed robin
- Rufous-tailed scrub robin
- Rufous-tailed shama
- Rufous-tailed stipplethroat
- Rufous-tailed tailorbird
- Rufous-tailed tyrant
- Rufous-tailed weaver
- Rufous-tailed xenops
- Rufous-thighed kite
- Rufous-throated antbird
- Rufous-throated bronze cuckoo
- Rufous-throated dipper
- Rufous-throated flycatcher
- Rufous-throated fulvetta
- Rufous-throated honeyeater
- Rufous-throated partridge
- Rufous-throated sapphire
- Rufous-throated solitaire
- Rufous-throated tanager
- Rufous-throated wren-babbler
- Rufous-vented chachalaca
- Rufous-vented grass babbler
- Rufous-vented ground cuckoo
- Rufous-vented laughingthrush
- Rufous-vented niltava
- Rufous-vented paradise flycatcher
- Rufous-vented tapaculo
- Rufous-vented tit
- Rufous-vented whitetip
- Rufous-vented yuhina
- Rufous-webbed brilliant
- Rufous-webbed bush tyrant
- Rufous-winged antshrike
- Rufous-winged buzzard
- Rufous-winged cisticola
- Rufous-winged fulvetta
- Rufous-winged ground cuckoo
- Rufous-winged illadopsis
- Rufous-winged philentoma
- Rufous-winged sparrow
- Rufous-winged sunbird
- Rufous-winged tanager
- Rufous-winged tyrannulet
- Rufous-winged woodpecker
- Running coua
- Rüppell's black chat
- Rüppell's korhaan
- Rüppell's parrot
- Rüppell's robin-chat
- Rüppell's starling
- Rüppell's vulture
- Rüppell's warbler
- Rüppell's weaver
- Ruspoli's turaco
- Russet antshrike
- Russet bush warbler
- Russet lark
- Russet nightingale-thrush
- Russet sparrow
- Russet-backed oropendola
- Russet-bellied spinetail
- Russet-capped tesia
- Russet-crowned crake
- Russet-crowned quail-dove
- Russet-crowned warbler
- Russet-mantled softtail
- Russet-naped wood rail
- Russet-naped wren
- Russet-tailed thrush
- Russet-throated puffbird
- Russet-winged schiffornis
- Russet-winged spadebill
- Rust-and-yellow tanager
- Rustic bunting
- Rusty blackbird
- Rusty bush lark
- Rusty flowerpiercer
- Rusty laughingthrush
- Rusty mouse-warbler
- Rusty pitohui
- Rusty sparrow
- Rusty thicketbird
- Rusty tinamou
- Rusty whistler
- Rusty-backed antwren
- Rusty-backed monjita
- Rusty-backed spinetail
- Rusty-barred owl
- Rusty-bellied brushfinch
- Rusty-bellied shortwing
- Rusty-belted tapaculo
- Rusty-breasted antpitta
- Rusty-breasted nunlet
- Rusty-breasted wheatear
- Rusty-breasted wren-babbler
- Rusty-browed warbling finch
- Rusty-capped fulvetta
- Rusty-capped kingfisher
- Rusty-cheeked scimitar babbler
- Rusty-collared seedeater
- Rusty-crowned babbler
- Rusty-crowned ground sparrow
- Rusty-crowned tit-spinetail
- Rusty-faced parrot
- Rusty-flanked crake
- Rusty-flanked treecreeper
- Rusty-fronted barwing
- Rusty-fronted canastero
- Rusty-fronted tody-flycatcher
- Rusty-headed spinetail
- Rusty-margined flycatcher
- Rusty-margined guan
- Rusty-naped pitta
- Rusty-necked piculet
- Rusty-tailed flycatcher
- Rusty-tinged antpitta
- Rusty-vented canastero
- Rusty-winged antwren
- Rusty-winged barbtail
- Rusty-winged starling
- Ruvu weaver
- Rwenzori apalis
- Rwenzori batis
- Rwenzori double-collared sunbird
- Rwenzori hill babbler
- Rwenzori turaco
- Ryukyu flycatcher
- Ryukyu minivet
- Ryukyu robin
- Ryūkyū scops owl
- †Ryukyu wood pigeon

== S ==
- Sabah partridge
- Sabine's gull
- Sabine's puffback
- Sabine's spinetail
- Sabota lark
- Sacred kingfisher
- Sad flycatcher
- Saddle-billed stork
- Saffron finch
- Saffron siskin
- Saffron toucanet
- Saffron-billed sparrow
- Saffron-cowled blackbird
- Saffron-crested tyrant-manakin
- Saffron-crowned tanager
- Saffron-headed parrot
- Sage grouse
- Sage thrasher
- Sagebrush sparrow
- Sahel bush sparrow
- Sahel paradise whydah
- Sahul brush cuckoo
- Sahul cicadabird
- Sahul sunbird
- Saipan reed warbler
- Sakalava rail
- Sakalava weaver
- Saker falcon
- Sakhalin grasshopper warbler
- Sakhalin leaf warbler
- Salinas monjita
- Salmon-crested cockatoo
- Saltmarsh sparrow
- Saltmarsh willet
- Salvadoran flycatcher
- Salvadori's antwren
- Salvadori's fig parrot
- Salvadori's nightjar
- Salvadori's pheasant
- Salvadori's seedeater
- Salvadori's teal
- Salvin's albatross
- Salvin's curassow
- Salvin's prion
- Samar crow
- Samar hornbill
- Samoan fantail
- Samoan flycatcher
- Samoan island thrush
- Samoan myzomela
- Samoan starling
- Samoan triller
- Samoan whistler
- Samoan white-eye
- Samoan woodhen
- San Andres vireo
- San Blas jay
- San Cristóbal mockingbird
- Sand lark
- Sand martin
- Sand partridge
- Sand-coloured nighthawk
- Sanderling
- Sandhill crane
- Sandhill grasswren
- Sandstone shrikethrush
- Sandwich tern
- Sandy gallito
- Sandy scops owl
- Sanford's sea eagle
- Sanford's white-eye
- Sangihe cicadabird
- Sangihe dwarf kingfisher
- Sangihe golden bulbul
- Sangihe hanging parrot
- Sangihe lilac kingfisher
- Sangihe scops owl
- Sangihe whistler
- Sangihe white-eye
- Sangkar white-eye
- Santa Cruz fantail
- Santa Cruz ground dove
- Santa Cruz shrikebill
- Santa Cruz white-eye
- Santa Marta antbird
- Santa Marta antpitta
- Santa Marta blossomcrown
- Santa Marta brushfinch
- Santa Marta bush tyrant
- Santa Marta foliage-gleaner
- Santa Marta mountain tanager
- Santa Marta parakeet
- Santa Marta sabrewing
- Santa Marta screech owl
- Santa Marta tapaculo
- Santa Marta warbler
- Santa Marta woodstar
- Santa Marta wren
- Santarem parakeet
- Santo thicketbird
- São Francisco black tyrant
- São Francisco sparrow
- São Paulo bristle tyrant
- São Tomé fiscal
- São Tomé green pigeon
- São Tomé grosbeak
- São Tomé ibis
- São Tomé olive pigeon
- São Tomé oriole
- São Tomé paradise flycatcher
- São Tomé prinia
- São Tomé scops owl
- São Tomé shorttail
- São Tomé spinetail
- São Tomé thrush
- São Tomé weaver
- São Tomé white-eye
- Sapayoa
- Sapphire flycatcher
- Sapphire quail-dove
- Sapphire-bellied hummingbird
- Sapphire-rumped parrotlet
- Sapphire-spangled emerald
- Sapphire-throated hummingbird
- Sapphire-vented puffleg
- Sardinian warbler
- Sargasso shearwater
- Sarus crane
- Sassi's olive greenbul
- Satanic nightjar
- Satin berrypecker
- Satin bowerbird
- Satin flycatcher
- Satin swiftlet
- Saturnine antshrike
- Satyr tragopan
- Saunders's gull
- Saunders's tern
- Savanna hawk
- Savanna nightjar
- Savannah sparrow
- Savi's warbler
- Savile's bustard
- Saw-billed hermit
- Saxaul sparrow
- Say's phoebe
- Sayaca tanager
- Scale-crested pygmy tyrant
- Scale-feathered malkoha
- Scale-throated earthcreeper
- Scale-throated hermit
- Scaled antbird
- Scaled antpitta
- Scaled chachalaca
- Scaled dove
- Scaled flowerpiercer
- Scaled fruiteater
- Scaled ground cuckoo
- Scaled metaltail
- Scaled piculet
- Scaled pigeon
- Scaled quail
- Scaled spinetail
- Scaled woodcreeper
- Scallop-breasted antpitta
- Scalloped antbird
- Scalloped woodcreeper
- Scaly babbler
- Scaly chatterer
- Scaly ground roller
- Scaly laughingthrush
- Scaly spurfowl
- Scaly thrush
- Scaly-bellied woodpecker
- Scaly-breasted bulbul
- Scaly-breasted cupwing
- Scaly-breasted honeyeater
- Scaly-breasted hummingbird
- Scaly-breasted illadopsis
- Scaly-breasted kingfisher
- Scaly-breasted lorikeet
- Scaly-breasted munia
- Scaly-breasted thrasher
- Scaly-crowned babbler
- Scaly-crowned honeyeater
- Scaly-feathered weaver
- Scaly-headed parrot
- Scaly-naped amazon
- Scaly-naped pigeon
- Scaly-sided merganser
- Scaly-throated foliage-gleaner
- Scaly-throated honeyguide
- Scaly-throated leaftosser
- Scarce swift
- Scarlet finch
- Scarlet ibis
- Scarlet macaw
- Scarlet minivet
- Scarlet myzomela
- Scarlet robin
- Scarlet tanager
- Scarlet-and-white tanager
- Scarlet-backed flowerpecker
- Scarlet-backed woodpecker
- Scarlet-banded barbet
- Scarlet-bellied mountain tanager
- Scarlet-breasted dacnis
- Scarlet-breasted flowerpecker
- Scarlet-breasted fruit dove
- Scarlet-breasted fruiteater
- Scarlet-browed tanager
- Scarlet-chested parrot
- Scarlet-chested sunbird
- Scarlet-collared flowerpecker
- Scarlet-crowned barbet
- Scarlet-faced liocichla
- Scarlet-fronted parakeet
- Scarlet-headed blackbird
- Scarlet-headed flowerpecker
- Scarlet-hooded barbet
- Scarlet-horned manakin
- Scarlet-rumped cacique
- Scarlet-rumped tanager
- Scarlet-rumped trogon
- Scarlet-shouldered parrotlet
- Scarlet-thighed dacnis
- Scarlet-throated tanager
- Scarlet-tufted sunbird
- Schalow's turaco
- Scheepmaker's crowned pigeon
- Schlegel's asity
- Schlegel's francolin
- Schneider's pitta
- Schwartz's antthrush
- Scimitar-billed woodcreeper
- Scimitar-winged piha
- Scintillant hummingbird
- Scissor-tailed flycatcher
- Scissor-tailed hummingbird
- Scissor-tailed kite
- Scissor-tailed nightjar
- Sclater's antwren
- Sclater's crowned pigeon
- Sclater's lark
- Sclater's monal
- Sclater's myzomela
- Sclater's tyrannulet
- Sclater's whistler
- Scopoli's shearwater
- Scott's oriole
- Scottish crossbill
- Screaming cowbird
- Screaming piha
- Scribble-tailed canastero
- Scripps's murrelet
- Scrub blackbird
- Scrub euphonia
- Scrub greenlet
- Scrub honeyeater
- Scrub tanager
- Scrubtit
- Seaside sparrow
- Secretarybird
- Sedge warbler
- Sedge wren
- See-see partridge
- Selayar whistler
- Selva cacique
- Semicollared flycatcher
- Semicollared hawk
- Semicollared puffbird
- Semipalmated plover
- Semipalmated sandpiper
- Semiplumbeous hawk
- Semper's warbler
- Senegal batis
- Senegal coucal
- Senegal eremomela
- Senegal lapwing
- Senegal parrot
- Senegal thick-knee
- Sennar penduline tit
- Sentinel lark
- Sentinel rock thrush
- Sepia-brown wren
- Sepia-capped flycatcher
- Seram boobook
- Seram bush warbler
- Seram friarbird
- Seram golden bulbul
- Seram honeyeater
- Seram imperial pigeon
- Seram mountain pigeon
- Seram thrush
- Seram white-eye
- Serendib scops owl
- Serra antwren
- Serra do Mar bristle tyrant
- Serra do Mar tyrant-manakin
- Serra finch
- Seven-colored tanager
- Seychelles black parrot
- Seychelles blue pigeon
- Seychelles bulbul
- Seychelles fody
- Seychelles kestrel
- Seychelles magpie-robin
- Seychelles paradise flycatcher
- †Seychelles parakeet
- Seychelles scops owl
- Seychelles sunbird
- Seychelles swiftlet
- Seychelles warbler
- Seychelles white-eye
- Shade bush warbler
- Shaft-tailed whydah
- Sharp-beaked ground finch
- Sharp-billed canastero
- Sharp-billed treehunter
- Sharp-shinned hawk
- Sharp-tailed grass tyrant
- Sharp-tailed grouse
- Sharp-tailed ibis
- Sharp-tailed sandpiper
- Sharp-tailed starling
- Sharp-tailed streamcreeper
- Sharpbill
- Sharpe's akalat
- Sharpe's apalis
- Sharpe's drongo
- Sharpe's longclaw
- Sharpe's rosefinch
- Sharpe's starling
- Shear-tailed grey tyrant
- Shelley's crimsonwing
- Shelley's eagle-owl
- Shelley's francolin
- Shelley's greenbul
- Shelley's oliveback
- Shelley's sparrow
- Shelley's starling
- Shelley's sunbird
- Shikra
- Shining bronze cuckoo
- Shining drongo
- Shining flycatcher
- Shining honeycreeper
- Shining sunbeam
- Shining-blue kingfisher
- Shining-green hummingbird
- Shiny cowbird
- Shiny whistling thrush
- Shoebill
- Shore plover
- Short-bearded honeyeater
- Short-billed canastero
- Short-billed dowitcher
- Short-billed gull
- Short-billed honeycreeper
- Short-billed leaftosser
- Short-billed miner
- Short-billed minivet
- Short-billed pigeon
- Short-billed pipit
- Short-clawed lark
- Short-crested coquette
- Short-crested flycatcher
- Short-crested monarch
- Short-eared owl
- Short-legged ground roller
- Short-tailed akalat
- Short-tailed albatross
- Short-tailed antthrush
- Short-tailed babbler
- Short-tailed batis
- Short-tailed drongo
- Short-tailed emerald
- Short-tailed field tyrant
- Short-tailed grasswren
- Short-tailed hawk
- Short-tailed lark
- Short-tailed nighthawk
- Short-tailed paradigalla
- Short-tailed parrot
- Short-tailed parrotbill
- Short-tailed pipit
- Short-tailed pygmy tyrant
- Short-tailed scimitar babbler
- Short-tailed shearwater
- Short-tailed starling
- Short-tailed swift
- Short-tailed woodstar
- Short-toed coucal
- Short-toed rock thrush
- Short-toed snake eagle
- Short-toed treecreeper
- Short-winged cisticola
- Shovel-billed kookaburra
- Shrike-like tanager
- Shy albatross
- Shy ground dove
- Shy heathwren
- Siamese fireback
- Siamese pied myna
- Siau scops owl
- Siberian accentor
- Siberian blue robin
- Siberian crane
- Siberian grouse
- Siberian house martin
- Siberian jay
- Siberian nuthatch
- Siberian pipit
- Siberian rubythroat
- Siberian sand plover
- Siberian stonechat
- Siberian thrush
- Sibilant sirystes
- Sichuan bush warbler
- Sichuan jay
- Sichuan leaf warbler
- Sichuan partridge
- Sichuan thrush
- Sichuan tit
- Sichuan treecreeper
- Sick's swift
- Sickle-billed vanga
- Sickle-winged chat
- Sickle-winged guan
- Sickle-winged nightjar
- Sierra de Lema flycatcher
- Sierra Leone prinia
- Sierra Madre crow
- Sierra Madre ground warbler
- Sierra Madre sparrow
- Sierra Nevada antpitta
- Sierra Nevada brushfinch
- Sierran elaenia
- Sikkim treecreeper
- Sikkim wedge-billed babbler
- Silky-tailed nightjar
- Sillem's rosefinch
- Silver gull
- Silver oriole
- Silver pheasant
- Silver teal
- Silver-backed butcherbird
- Silver-backed needletail
- Silver-backed tanager
- Silver-beaked tanager
- Silver-breasted broadbill
- Silver-capped fruit dove
- Silver-crowned friarbird
- Silver-eared honeyeater
- Silver-eared laughingthrush
- Silver-eared mesia
- Silver-rumped spinetail
- Silver-throated bushtit
- Silver-throated tanager
- Silver-tipped imperial pigeon
- Silverbird
- Silvered antbird
- Silvereye
- Silvery grebe
- Silvery pigeon
- Silvery-cheeked antshrike
- Silvery-cheeked hornbill
- Silvery-fronted tapaculo
- Silvery-throated jay
- Silvery-throated spinetail
- Simeulue parrot
- Simeulue scops owl
- Simple greenbul
- Sinai rosefinch
- Sinaloa crow
- Sinaloa martin
- Sinaloa wren
- Sincorá antwren
- Sind sparrow
- Sind woodpecker
- Singing bush lark
- Singing cisticola
- Singing honeyeater
- Singing quail
- Singing starling
- Sira barbet
- Sira curassow
- Sira tanager
- Sirkeer malkoha
- Sjöstedt's barred owlet
- Sjöstedt's greenbul
- Sladen's barbet
- Slate-colored antbird
- Slate-colored boubou
- Slate-colored hawk
- Slate-colored solitaire
- Slate-coloured grosbeak
- Slate-coloured seedeater
- Slate-throated gnatcatcher
- Slate-throated whitestart
- Slaty antwren
- Slaty becard
- Slaty bristlefront
- Slaty brushfinch
- Slaty bunting
- Slaty cuckooshrike
- Slaty egret
- Slaty elaenia
- Slaty finch
- Slaty flowerpiercer
- Slaty gnateater
- Slaty monarch
- Slaty robin
- Slaty spinetail
- Slaty tanager
- Slaty vireo
- Slaty-backed chat-tyrant
- Slaty-backed flycatcher
- Slaty-backed forest falcon
- Slaty-backed forktail
- Slaty-backed gull
- Slaty-backed hemispingus
- Slaty-backed jungle flycatcher
- Slaty-backed nightingale-thrush
- Slaty-backed thornbill
- Slaty-backed thrush
- Slaty-bellied tesia
- Slaty-blue flycatcher
- Slaty-breasted rail
- Slaty-breasted tinamou
- Slaty-breasted wood rail
- Slaty-capped flycatcher
- Slaty-capped shrike-vireo
- Slaty-crowned antpitta
- Slaty-headed longbill
- Slaty-headed parakeet
- Slaty-headed tody-flycatcher
- Slaty-legged crake
- Slaty-mantled goshawk
- Slaty-masked tinamou
- Slaty-tailed trogon
- Slaty-winged foliage-gleaner
- Slender antbird
- Slender sheartail
- Slender-billed babbler
- †Slender-billed curlew
- Slender-billed finch
- Slender-billed flufftail
- †Slender-billed grackle
- Slender-billed greenbul
- Slender-billed gull
- Slender-billed inezia
- Slender-billed kite
- Slender-billed miner
- Slender-billed oriole
- Slender-billed parakeet
- Slender-billed prion
- Slender-billed scimitar babbler
- Slender-billed starling
- Slender-billed thornbill
- Slender-billed vulture
- Slender-billed weaver
- Slender-billed white-eye
- Slender-billed xenops
- Slender-footed tyrannulet
- Slender-tailed nightjar
- Slender-tailed woodstar
- Small ground finch
- Small Lifou white-eye
- Small minivet
- Small niltava
- Small pratincole
- Small tree finch
- Small-billed elaenia
- Small-billed tinamou
- Small-headed elaenia
- Smew
- Smith's longspur
- Smoke-colored pewee
- Smoky bush tyrant
- Smoky robin
- Smoky warbler
- Smoky-brown woodpecker
- Smoky-fronted tody-flycatcher
- Smooth-billed ani
- Snail kite
- †Snail-eating coua
- Snares penguin
- Snares snipe
- Snethlage's antpitta
- Snethlage's tody-tyrant
- Snoring rail
- Snow bunting
- Snow goose
- Snow Mountain quail
- Snow Mountain robin
- Snow partridge
- Snow petrel
- Snow pigeon
- Snow-capped manakin
- Snowcap
- Snowy albatross
- Snowy cotinga
- Snowy egret
- Snowy owl
- Snowy plover
- Snowy sheathbill
- Snowy-bellied hummingbird
- Snowy-browed flycatcher
- Snowy-cheeked laughingthrush
- Snowy-crowned robin-chat
- Snowy-crowned tern
- Snowy-throated babbler
- Snowy-throated kingbird
- Sociable lapwing
- Sociable weaver
- Social flycatcher
- Society kingfisher
- Socorro dove
- Socorro mockingbird
- Socorro parakeet
- Socorro wren
- Socotra bunting
- Socotra buzzard
- Socotra cisticola
- Socotra cormorant
- Socotra golden-winged grosbeak
- Socotra scops owl
- Socotra sparrow
- Socotra starling
- Socotra sunbird
- Socotra warbler
- Socotra white-eye
- Soft-plumaged petrel
- Sokoke pipit
- Sokoke scops owl
- Solitary cacique
- Solitary eagle
- Solitary sandpiper
- Solitary snipe
- Solitary tinamou
- Solomons brush cuckoo
- Solomons cicadabird
- Solomons corella
- Solomons frogmouth
- Solomons island thrush
- Solomons monarch
- Solomons nightjar
- Solomons robin
- Solomons rufous fantail
- Solomons white-eye
- Somali bee-eater
- Somali bunting
- Somali courser
- Somali crombec
- Somali crow
- Somali fiscal
- Somali golden-winged grosbeak
- Somali lark
- Somali ostrich
- Somali pigeon
- Somali short-toed lark
- Somali sparrow
- Somali starling
- Somali thrush
- Somali wheatear
- Sombre greenbul
- Sombre hummingbird
- Sombre kingfisher
- Sombre nightjar
- Sombre pigeon
- Sombre rock chat
- Sombre tit
- Song parrot
- Song sparrow
- Song thrush
- Song wren
- Sooretama slaty antshrike
- Sooty albatross
- Sooty ant tanager
- Sooty antbird
- Sooty babbler
- Sooty barbthroat
- Sooty bushtit
- Sooty chat
- Sooty falcon
- Sooty flycatcher
- Sooty grassquit
- Sooty grouse
- Sooty gull
- Sooty honeyeater
- Sooty myzomela
- Sooty owl
- Sooty oystercatcher
- Sooty shearwater
- Sooty shrikethrush
- Sooty swift
- Sooty tern
- Sooty thicket fantail
- Sooty thrush
- Sooty tyrannulet
- Sooty-capped babbler
- Sooty-capped chlorospingus
- Sooty-capped hermit
- Sooty-capped puffbird
- Sooty-crowned flycatcher
- Sooty-faced finch
- Sooty-fronted spinetail
- Sooty-headed bulbul
- Sooty-headed tyrannulet
- Sooty-headed wren
- Sora
- Souimanga sunbird
- South African cliff swallow
- South African shelduck
- South American painted-snipe
- South American tern
- South Georgia diving petrel
- South Georgia pipit
- South Island kōkako
- South Island oystercatcher
- †South Island piopio
- South Island robin
- South Island saddleback
- †South Island snipe
- South Island takahē
- South Melanesian cuckooshrike
- South Moluccan cicadabird
- South Moluccan pitta
- South Moluccan sunbird
- South Pare white-eye
- South polar skua
- Southeastern beardless tyrannulet
- Southern antpipit
- Southern bald ibis
- Southern banded snake eagle
- Southern bentbill
- Southern black flycatcher
- Southern black korhaan
- Southern black tit
- Southern blue jewel-babbler
- Southern boubou
- Southern bristle tyrant
- Southern brown kiwi
- Southern brown-throated weaver
- Southern carmine bee-eater
- Southern cassowary
- Southern chestnut-breasted wren
- Southern chestnut-tailed antbird
- Southern citril
- Southern crested guineafowl
- Southern double-collared sunbird
- Southern emerald toucanet
- Southern emu-wren
- Southern fiscal
- Southern fulmar
- Southern giant hummingbird
- Southern giant petrel
- Southern grey-headed sparrow
- Southern grosbeak-canary
- Southern ground hornbill
- Southern hill myna
- Southern house wren
- Southern hyliota
- Southern lapwing
- Southern Marquesan reed warbler
- Southern martin
- Southern masked weaver
- Southern nightingale-wren
- Southern nutcracker
- Southern pied babbler
- Southern pochard
- Southern red bishop
- Southern red-billed hornbill
- Southern red-fronted tinkerbird
- Southern rough-winged swallow
- Southern royal albatross
- Southern screamer
- Southern scrub flycatcher
- Southern scrub robin
- Southern shrikebill
- Southern silvery kingfisher
- Southern sooty woodpecker
- Southern tchagra
- Southern tropical pewee
- Southern variable pitohui
- Southern white-crowned shrike
- Southern white-faced owl
- Southern white-fringed antwren
- Southern whiteface
- Southern yellow white-eye
- Southern yellow-billed hornbill
- Southern yellowthroat
- Souza's shrike
- Spangle-cheeked tanager
- Spangled coquette
- Spangled cotinga
- Spangled drongo
- Spangled honeyeater
- Spangled kookaburra
- Spanish imperial eagle
- Spanish sparrow
- Sparkling violetear
- Sparkling-tailed woodstar
- Speckle-breasted antpitta
- Speckle-breasted woodpecker
- Speckle-breasted wren
- Speckle-chested piculet
- Speckle-faced parrot
- Speckle-fronted weaver
- Speckle-throated woodpecker
- Speckled antshrike
- Speckled boobook
- Speckled chachalaca
- Speckled hummingbird
- Speckled mourner
- Speckled mousebird
- Speckled nightingale-thrush
- Speckled piculet
- Speckled pigeon
- Speckled rail
- Speckled reed warbler
- Speckled spinetail
- Speckled tanager
- Speckled tinkerbird
- Speckled warbler
- Speckled wood pigeon
- Spectacled barwing
- Spectacled bristle tyrant
- Spectacled bulbul
- †Spectacled cormorant
- Spectacled eider
- Spectacled finch
- Spectacled flowerpecker
- Spectacled fulvetta
- Spectacled guillemot
- Spectacled imperial pigeon
- Spectacled longbill
- Spectacled monarch
- Spectacled owl
- Spectacled parrotbill
- Spectacled parrotlet
- Spectacled petrel
- Spectacled prickletail
- Spectacled spiderhunter
- Spectacled tern
- Spectacled tetraka
- Spectacled thrush
- Spectacled tyrannulet
- Spectacled tyrant
- Spectacled warbler
- Spectacled weaver
- Spectacled whitestart
- Speke's weaver
- Spice imperial pigeon
- Spike-heeled lark
- Spillmann's tapaculo
- Spinifex pigeon
- Spinifexbird
- Spiny babbler
- Spiny-cheeked honeyeater
- Spix's guan
- Spix's macaw
- Spix's spinetail
- Spix's warbling antbird
- Spix's woodcreeper
- Splendid astrapia
- Splendid fairywren
- Splendid starling
- Splendid sunbird
- Splendid woodpecker
- Spoon-billed sandpiper
- Spot-backed antbird
- Spot-backed antshrike
- Spot-backed antwren
- Spot-backed puffbird
- Spot-bellied bobwhite
- Spot-bellied eagle-owl
- Spot-billed ground tyrant
- Spot-billed pelican
- Spot-billed toucanet
- Spot-breasted antvireo
- Spot-breasted cuckoo-dove
- Spot-breasted ibis
- Spot-breasted lapwing
- Spot-breasted laughingthrush
- Spot-breasted oriole
- Spot-breasted parrotbill
- Spot-breasted scimitar babbler
- Spot-breasted thornbird
- Spot-breasted woodpecker
- Spot-breasted wren
- Spot-crowned antvireo
- Spot-crowned barbet
- Spot-crowned euphonia
- Spot-crowned woodcreeper
- Spot-flanked barbet
- Spot-flanked gallinule
- Spot-fronted swift
- Spot-necked babbler
- Spot-necked bulbul
- Spot-tailed antwren
- Spot-tailed nightjar
- Spot-tailed sparrowhawk
- Spot-throat
- Spot-throated babbler
- Spot-throated flameback
- Spot-throated hummingbird
- Spot-throated woodcreeper
- Spot-winged antbird
- Spot-winged antshrike
- Spot-winged falconet
- Spot-winged grosbeak
- Spot-winged monarch
- Spot-winged parrotlet
- Spot-winged pigeon
- Spot-winged rosefinch
- Spot-winged starling
- Spot-winged thrush
- Spot-winged wood quail
- Spotless crake
- Spotless starling
- Spotted antbird
- Spotted antpitta
- Spotted bamboowren
- Spotted barbtail
- Spotted berrypecker
- Spotted bowerbird
- Spotted bush warbler
- Spotted buttonquail
- Spotted catbird
- Spotted crake
- Spotted crocias
- Spotted dove
- Spotted eagle-owl
- Spotted elachura
- Spotted fantail
- Spotted flycatcher
- Spotted forktail
- †Spotted green pigeon
- Spotted greenbul
- Spotted ground thrush
- Spotted harrier
- Spotted honeyeater
- Spotted honeyguide
- Spotted imperial pigeon
- Spotted jewel-babbler
- Spotted kestrel
- Spotted laughingthrush
- Spotted nightjar
- Spotted nothura
- Spotted owl
- Spotted owlet
- Spotted palm thrush
- Spotted pardalote
- Spotted piculet
- Spotted puffbird
- Spotted quail-thrush
- Spotted rail
- Spotted redshank
- Spotted sandgrouse
- Spotted sandpiper
- Spotted scrubwren
- Spotted shag
- Spotted tanager
- Spotted thick-knee
- Spotted thrush-babbler
- Spotted tody-flycatcher
- Spotted towhee
- Spotted whistling duck
- Spotted wood kingfisher
- Spotted wood owl
- Spotted wood quail
- Spotted woodcreeper
- Spotted wren
- Sprague's pipit
- Spruce grouse
- Spur-winged goose
- Spur-winged lapwing
- Squacco heron
- Squamate antbird
- Square-tailed bulbul
- Square-tailed drongo
- Square-tailed drongo-cuckoo
- Square-tailed kite
- Square-tailed nightjar
- Square-tailed saw-wing
- Squatter pigeon
- Sri Lanka bay owl
- Sri Lanka blue magpie
- Sri Lanka bush warbler
- Sri Lanka drongo
- Sri Lanka frogmouth
- Sri Lanka green pigeon
- Sri Lanka grey hornbill
- Sri Lanka hanging parrot
- Sri Lanka hill myna
- Sri Lanka junglefowl
- Sri Lanka scimitar babbler
- Sri Lanka shama
- Sri Lanka spurfowl
- Sri Lanka swallow
- Sri Lanka thrush
- Sri Lanka whistling thrush
- Sri Lanka white-eye
- Sri Lanka wood pigeon
- Sri Lanka woodshrike
- †St. Helena crake
- †St. Helena cuckoo
- †St. Helena hoopoe
- †St. Helena petrel
- St. Helena plover
- †St. Helena rail
- St. Kitts bullfinch
- St. Lucia amazon
- St. Lucia black finch
- St. Lucia oriole
- St. Lucia thrasher
- St. Lucia warbler
- St. Lucia wren
- St. Vincent amazon
- St. Vincent wren
- Standard-winged nightjar
- Standardwing
- Star finch
- Star-chested treerunner
- Star-spotted nightjar
- Star-throated antwren
- Stark's lark
- Starred wood quail
- Starry owlet-nightjar
- Steel-blue flycatcher
- Steel-blue whydah
- Steely-vented hummingbird
- Steinbach's canastero
- Stejneger's petrel
- Stejneger's scoter
- Stella's lorikeet
- Steller's eider
- Steller's jay
- Steller's sea eagle
- Stephan's emerald dove
- Stephen's lorikeet
- Steppe eagle
- Stewart Island shag
- Stierling's woodpecker
- Stierling's wren-warbler
- Stiles's tapaculo
- Stilt sandpiper
- Stitchbird
- Stock dove
- Stolid flycatcher
- Stone partridge
- Stork-billed kingfisher
- Storm's stork
- Stout cisticola
- Stout-billed cinclodes
- Stout-billed cuckooshrike
- Straight-billed earthcreeper
- Straight-billed hermit
- Straight-billed reedhaunter
- Straight-billed woodcreeper
- Straneck's tyrannulet
- Strange weaver
- Strange-tailed tyrant
- Straw-backed tanager
- Straw-headed bulbul
- Straw-necked ibis
- Straw-tailed whydah
- Streak-backed antshrike
- Streak-backed canastero
- Streak-backed oriole
- Streak-backed tit-spinetail
- Streak-breasted bulbul
- Streak-breasted fantail
- Streak-breasted honeyeater
- Streak-breasted scimitar babbler
- Streak-breasted treehunter
- Streak-breasted woodpecker
- Streak-capped antwren
- Streak-capped spinetail
- Streak-capped treehunter
- Streak-chested antpitta
- Streak-crowned antvireo
- Streak-crowned mountain tanager
- Streak-eared bulbul
- Streak-fronted antshrike
- Streak-fronted thornbird
- Streak-headed antbird
- Streak-headed honeyeater
- Streak-headed mannikin
- Streak-headed woodcreeper
- Streak-necked flycatcher
- Streak-throated barwing
- Streak-throated bush tyrant
- Streak-throated canastero
- Streak-throated hermit
- Streak-throated swallow
- Streak-throated woodpecker
- Streaked barwing
- Streaked berrypecker
- Streaked bowerbird
- Streaked bulbul
- Streaked dacnis
- Streaked flycatcher
- Streaked laughingthrush
- Streaked rosefinch
- Streaked saltator
- Streaked scrub warbler
- Streaked shearwater
- Streaked spiderhunter
- Streaked tuftedcheek
- Streaked weaver
- Streaked wren-babbler
- Streaked xenops
- Streaky seedeater
- Streaky-breasted flufftail
- Streaky-breasted spiderhunter
- Streaky-headed seedeater
- Streamer-tailed tyrant
- Stresemann's bristlefront
- Striated antbird
- Striated antthrush
- Striated babbler
- Striated bulbul
- Striated caracara
- Striated earthcreeper
- Striated fieldwren
- Striated grassbird
- Striated grasswren
- Striated heron
- Striated laughingthrush
- Striated lorikeet
- Striated pardalote
- Striated softtail
- Striated starling
- Striated thornbill
- Striated wren-babbler
- Striated yuhina
- Strickland's woodpecker
- Striolated bunting
- Striolated manakin
- Striolated tit-spinetail
- Stripe-backed antbird
- Stripe-backed bittern
- Stripe-backed wren
- Stripe-breasted rhabdornis
- Stripe-breasted seedeater
- Stripe-breasted spinetail
- Stripe-breasted starthroat
- Stripe-breasted tit
- Stripe-breasted woodpecker
- Stripe-breasted wren
- Stripe-cheeked greenbul
- Stripe-cheeked woodpecker
- Stripe-chested antwren
- Stripe-crowned spinetail
- Stripe-faced wood quail
- Stripe-headed antpitta
- Stripe-headed rhabdornis
- Stripe-headed sparrow
- Stripe-necked tody-tyrant
- Stripe-tailed hummingbird
- Stripe-tailed yellow finch
- Stripe-throated bulbul
- Stripe-throated hermit
- Stripe-throated jery
- Stripe-throated wren
- Stripe-throated yuhina
- Striped crake
- Striped cuckoo
- Striped flufftail
- Striped honeyeater
- Striped kingfisher
- Striped laughingthrush
- Striped owl
- Striped pipit
- Striped prinia
- Striped sparrow
- Striped treehunter
- Striped woodcreeper
- Striped woodpecker
- Striped wren-babbler
- Strong-billed honeyeater
- Strong-billed woodcreeper
- Stub-tailed antbird
- Stub-tailed spadebill
- Stubble quail
- Stuhlmann's starling
- Styan's bulbul
- Styan's grasshopper warbler
- Stygian owl
- Subandean parakeet
- Subantarctic shearwater
- Subantarctic snipe
- Subdesert brush warbler
- Subdesert mesite
- Subtropical doradito
- Subtropical pygmy owl
- Sucre antpitta
- Sudan golden sparrow
- Suiriri flycatcher
- Sula cicadabird
- Sula cuckoo-dove
- Sula dwarf kingfisher
- Sula fruit dove
- Sula golden bulbul
- Sula hanging parrot
- Sula jungle flycatcher
- Sula lorikeet
- Sula megapode
- Sula pitta
- Sula scops owl
- Sulawesi babbler
- Sulawesi blue flycatcher
- Sulawesi brush cuckoo
- Sulawesi bush warbler
- Sulawesi cicadabird
- Sulawesi crow
- Sulawesi cuckoo
- Sulawesi cuckoo-dove
- Sulawesi drongo
- Sulawesi dwarf kingfisher
- Sulawesi fantail
- Sulawesi goshawk
- Sulawesi ground dove
- Sulawesi hawk-eagle
- Sulawesi heleia
- Sulawesi hornbill
- Sulawesi leaf warbler
- Sulawesi lilac kingfisher
- Sulawesi myna
- Sulawesi myzomela
- Sulawesi nightjar
- Sulawesi pitta
- Sulawesi pygmy woodpecker
- Sulawesi scops owl
- Sulawesi serpent eagle
- Sulawesi streaked flycatcher
- Sulawesi thrush
- Sulawesi woodcock
- Sulphur-bearded reedhaunter
- Sulphur-bellied bulbul
- Sulphur-bellied flycatcher
- Sulphur-bellied tyrannulet
- Sulphur-bellied tyrant-manakin
- Sulphur-bellied warbler
- Sulphur-billed nuthatch
- Sulphur-breasted myzomela
- Sulphur-breasted parakeet
- Sulphur-breasted warbler
- Sulphur-crested cockatoo
- Sulphur-rumped myiobius
- Sulphur-rumped tanager
- Sulphur-throated finch
- Sulphur-vented whistler
- Sulphur-winged parakeet
- Sulphury flycatcher
- Sultan tit
- Sultan's cuckoo-dove
- Sulu bleeding-heart
- Sulu boobook
- Sulu cuckooshrike
- Sulu hornbill
- Sulu jungle flycatcher
- Sulu pygmy woodpecker
- Sumatran babbler
- Sumatran blue robin
- Sumatran bulbul
- Sumatran cochoa
- Sumatran drongo
- Sumatran flowerpecker
- Sumatran frogmouth
- Sumatran green pigeon
- Sumatran ground cuckoo
- Sumatran laughingthrush
- Sumatran leafbird
- Sumatran partridge
- Sumatran peacock-pheasant
- Sumatran shortwing
- Sumatran treepie
- Sumatran trogon
- Sumatran wren-babbler
- Sumba brown flycatcher
- Sumba buttonquail
- Sumba eclectus
- Sumba flowerpecker
- Sumba flycatcher
- Sumba green pigeon
- Sumba hornbill
- Sumba jungle flycatcher
- Sumba myzomela
- Sumichrast's wren
- Summer tanager
- Sun lark
- Sun parakeet
- Sunbittern
- Sunda blue flycatcher
- Sunda brush cuckoo
- Sunda collared dove
- Sunda coucal
- Sunda crow
- Sunda cuckoo
- Sunda cuckooshrike
- Sunda forktail
- Sunda frogmouth
- Sunda laughingthrush
- Sunda minivet
- Sunda owlet
- Sunda pied fantail
- Sunda pygmy woodpecker
- Sunda scimitar babbler
- Sunda scops owl
- Sunda teal
- Sunda thrush
- Sunda warbler
- Sundaic island thrush
- Sungrebe
- Sunset lorikeet
- Superb fairywren
- Superb fruit dove
- Superb lyrebird
- Superb parrot
- Superb pitta
- Superb starling
- Superb sunbird
- Superciliaried hemispingus
- Superciliated wren
- Supertramp fantail
- Surf scoter
- Surfbird
- Surucua trogon
- Swahili sparrow
- Swainson's flycatcher
- Swainson's hawk
- Swainson's sparrow
- Swainson's spurfowl
- Swainson's thrush
- Swainson's warbler
- Swallow tanager
- Swallow-tailed bee-eater
- Swallow-tailed cotinga
- Swallow-tailed gull
- Swallow-tailed hummingbird
- Swallow-tailed kite
- Swallow-tailed nightjar
- Swallow-winged puffbird
- Swamp boubou
- Swamp flycatcher
- Swamp francolin
- Swamp grass babbler
- Swamp harrier
- Swamp nightjar
- Swamp palm bulbul
- Swamp sparrow
- Swan goose
- Swee waxbill
- Swierstra's spurfowl
- Swift parrot
- Swinhoe's minivet
- Swinhoe's pheasant
- Swinhoe's rail
- Swinhoe's snipe
- Swinhoe's storm petrel
- Swinhoe's white-eye
- Sword-billed hummingbird
- Swynnerton's robin
- Sykes's lark
- Sykes's nightjar
- Sykes's warbler
- Syrian serin
- Syrian woodpecker

== T ==
- Tablas drongo
- Tablas fantail
- Tacarcuna chlorospingus
- Tacarcuna tapaculo
- Tacarcuna warbler
- Tacarcuna wood quail
- Tacazze sunbird
- Tachira antpitta
- Taczanowski's brushfinch
- Taczanowski's ground tyrant
- Taczanowski's tinamou
- Tagula butcherbird
- Tagula honeyeater
- Tagula white-eye
- †Tahiti crake
- Tahiti monarch
- Tahiti petrel
- †Tahiti rail
- Tahiti reed warbler
- †Tahiti sandpiper
- Tahiti swallow
- Taiga bean goose
- Taiga flycatcher
- Taita apalis
- Taita falcon
- Taita fiscal
- Taita thrush
- Taita white-eye
- Taiwan bamboo partridge
- Taiwan barbet
- Taiwan barwing
- Taiwan blue magpie
- Taiwan bullfinch
- Taiwan bush robin
- Taiwan bush warbler
- Taiwan cupwing
- Taiwan fulvetta
- Taiwan hwamei
- Taiwan liocichla
- Taiwan partridge
- Taiwan rosefinch
- Taiwan scimitar babbler
- Taiwan shortwing
- Taiwan thrush
- Taiwan vivid niltava
- Taiwan whistling thrush
- Taiwan yuhina
- Talamanca hummingbird
- Talaud bush-hen
- Talaud kingfisher
- Talaud rail
- Taliabu bush warbler
- Taliabu fantail
- Taliabu myzomela
- Tamarugo conebill
- Tamaulipas crow
- Tamaulipas pygmy owl
- Tambourine dove
- Tan-capped catbird
- Tana River cisticola
- Tanager finch
- Tanahjampea monarch
- Tanimbar boobook
- Tanimbar bush warbler
- Tanimbar corella
- Tanimbar cuckoo-dove
- Tanimbar eclectus
- Tanimbar flycatcher
- Tanimbar friarbird
- Tanimbar megapode
- Tanimbar monarch
- Tanimbar myzomela
- Tanimbar oriole
- Tanimbar starling
- Tanna fruit dove
- †Tanna ground dove
- Tanzanian illadopsis
- Tanzanian masked weaver
- Tanzanian red-billed hornbill
- Tapajos antpitta
- Tapajos fire-eye
- Tapajós hermit
- Tapajos scythebill
- Tarim babbler
- †Tasman Sea island thrush
- †Tasman starling
- Tasmanian boobook
- Tasmanian nativehen
- Tasmanian scrubwren
- Tasmanian thornbill
- Tatama tapaculo
- Tataupa tinamou
- Taveta weaver
- Taveuni silktail
- Tawitawi brown dove
- Tawny antpitta
- Tawny eagle
- Tawny fish owl
- Tawny frogmouth
- Tawny grassbird
- Tawny owl
- Tawny pipit
- Tawny straightbill
- Tawny tit-spinetail
- Tawny tufted flycatcher
- Tawny-backed fantail
- Tawny-bellied babbler
- Tawny-bellied hermit
- Tawny-bellied screech owl
- Tawny-bellied seedeater
- Tawny-breasted honeyeater
- Tawny-breasted myiobius
- Tawny-breasted parrotfinch
- Tawny-breasted tinamou
- Tawny-breasted wren-babbler
- Tawny-browed owl
- Tawny-capped euphonia
- Tawny-chested flycatcher
- Tawny-collared nightjar
- Tawny-crested tanager
- Tawny-crowned honeyeater
- Tawny-faced gnatwren
- Tawny-faced quail
- Tawny-flanked prinia
- Tawny-headed swallow
- Tawny-rumped tyrannulet
- Tawny-shouldered blackbird
- Tawny-throated dotterel
- Tawny-throated leaftosser
- Tawny-tufted toucanet
- Tawny-winged woodcreeper
- Tboli sunbird
- Teardrop white-eye
- Temminck's babbler
- Temminck's courser
- Temminck's lark
- Temminck's seedeater
- Temminck's stint
- Temminck's sunbird
- Temminck's tragopan
- Tenerife blue chaffinch
- Tenggara hill myna
- Tenggara paradise flycatcher
- Tenggara swiftlet
- Tenggara whistler
- Tennessee warbler
- Tepui antpitta
- Tepui brushfinch
- Tepui elaenia
- Tepui foliage-gleaner
- Tepui goldenthroat
- Tepui parrotlet
- Tepui spinetail
- Tepui swift
- Tepui tinamou
- Tepui toucanet
- Tepui vireo
- Tepui whitestart
- Tepui wren
- Terek sandpiper
- Terrestrial brownbul
- Tessmann's flycatcher
- Thamnornis
- Thekla's lark
- Thick-billed berrypecker
- Thick-billed cuckoo
- Thick-billed euphonia
- Thick-billed flowerpecker
- Thick-billed grasswren
- Thick-billed green pigeon
- †Thick-billed ground dove
- Thick-billed ground pigeon
- Thick-billed heleia
- Thick-billed kingbird
- Thick-billed lark
- Thick-billed longspur
- Thick-billed miner
- Thick-billed murre
- Thick-billed parrot
- Thick-billed raven
- Thick-billed saltator
- Thick-billed seed finch
- Thick-billed seedeater
- Thick-billed siskin
- Thick-billed spiderhunter
- Thick-billed vireo
- Thick-billed warbler
- Thick-billed weaver
- Thicket antpitta
- Thicket tinamou
- Thorn-tailed rayadito
- Three-banded courser
- Three-banded plover
- Three-banded rosefinch
- Three-banded warbler
- Three-streaked tchagra
- Three-striped flycatcher
- Three-striped hemispingus
- Three-striped warbler
- Three-toed jacamar
- Three-toed parrotbill
- Three-toed swiftlet
- Three-wattled bellbird
- Thrush nightingale
- Thrush-like antpitta
- Thrush-like wren
- Thyolo alethe
- Tibetan babax
- Tibetan blackbird
- Tibetan bunting
- Tibetan eared pheasant
- Tibetan lark
- Tibetan partridge
- Tibetan rosefinch
- Tibetan sand plover
- Tibetan sandgrouse
- Tibetan serin
- Tibetan snowcock
- Tibetan snowfinch
- Tickell's blue flycatcher
- Tickell's brown hornbill
- Tickell's leaf warbler
- Tickell's thrush
- Ticking doradito
- Tiger shrike
- Timberline wren
- Timneh parrot
- Timor blue flycatcher
- Timor boobook
- Timor cicadabird
- Timor cuckoo-dove
- Timor flowerpecker
- Timor friarbird
- Timor green pigeon
- Timor heleia
- Timor imperial pigeon
- Timor leaf warbler
- Timor nightjar
- Timor oriole
- Timor sparrow
- Timor stubtail
- Tinian monarch
- Tinkling cisticola
- Tiny cisticola
- Tiny hawk
- Tiny sunbird
- Tiny tyrant-manakin
- Tit berrypecker
- Tit hylia
- Tit-like dacnis
- Titicaca grebe
- Toco toucan
- Tocuyo sparrow
- Todd's antwren
- Todd's nightjar
- Todd's sirystes
- Tody motmot
- Togian boobook
- Togian golden bulbul
- Togian white-eye
- Togo paradise whydah
- Tolima blossomcrown
- Tolima dove
- Tomtit
- Tongan megapode
- Tongan whistler
- Tooth-billed bowerbird
- Tooth-billed hummingbird
- Tooth-billed pigeon
- Tooth-billed wren
- Topknot pigeon
- Toro olive greenbul
- Torrent duck
- Torrent flyrobin
- Torrent tyrannulet
- Torrent-lark
- Torresian crow
- Torresian imperial pigeon
- Torresian kingfisher
- Toucan barbet
- Tourmaline sunangel
- Townsend's shearwater
- Townsend's solitaire
- Townsend's storm petrel
- Townsend's warbler
- Tractrac chat
- Transvolcanic jay
- Tree martin
- Tree pipit
- Tree swallow
- Tremolo fantail
- Tres Marias hummingbird
- Tricolored blackbird
- Tricolored brushfinch
- Tricolored heron
- Tricolored parrotfinch
- Tricoloured munia
- Trilling cisticola
- Trilling gnatwren
- Trilling shrike-babbler
- Trilling tapaculo
- Trindade petrel
- Trinidad euphonia
- Trinidad motmot
- Trinidad piping guan
- Tristan albatross
- †Tristan moorhen
- Tristan thrush
- Tristram's bunting
- Tristram's starling
- Tristram's storm petrel
- Tristram's warbler
- Trocaz pigeon
- Tropeiro seedeater
- Tropical boubou
- Tropical gnatcatcher
- Tropical horned owl
- Tropical kingbird
- Tropical mockingbird
- Tropical parula
- Tropical royal flycatcher
- Tropical screech owl
- Tropical scrubwren
- Tropical shearwater
- Trumpet manucode
- Trumpeter finch
- Trumpeter hornbill
- Trumpeter swan
- Tsavo sunbird
- Tschudi's nightjar
- Tschudi's tapaculo
- Tsingy forest rail
- Tuamotu kingfisher
- Tuamotu reed warbler
- Tuamotu sandpiper
- Tucumán amazon
- Tucumán mountain finch
- Tufted antshrike
- Tufted coquette
- Tufted duck
- Tufted jay
- Tufted puffin
- Tufted tit-spinetail
- Tufted tit-tyrant
- Tufted titmouse
- Tūī
- Tui parakeet
- Tukangbesi sunbird
- Tullberg's woodpecker
- Tumbes hummingbird
- Tumbes pewee
- Tumbes sparrow
- Tumbes swallow
- Tumbes tyrant
- Tumbesian tyrannulet
- Tundra bean goose
- Tundra swan
- Turati's boubou
- Turkestan ground jay
- Turkestan short-toed lark
- Turkey vulture
- Turner's eremomela
- Turquoise cotinga
- Turquoise dacnis
- Turquoise flycatcher
- Turquoise jay
- Turquoise parrot
- Turquoise tanager
- Turquoise-browed motmot
- Turquoise-crowned hummingbird
- Turquoise-fronted amazon
- Turquoise-throated barbet
- Turquoise-throated puffleg
- Turquoise-winged parrotlet
- Tuxtla quail-dove
- Twelve-wired bird-of-paradise
- Twite
- Two-banded plover
- Two-banded puffbird
- Two-banded warbler
- Two-barred crossbill
- Two-barred warbler
- Tylas vanga
- Tyrannine woodcreeper
- Tyrian metaltail
- Tytler's leaf warbler

== U ==
- Ua Pou monarch
- Udzungwa forest partridge
- Uganda woodland warbler
- †ʻUla-ʻai-hāwane
- Ultramarine flycatcher
- Ultramarine grosbeak
- Ultramarine kingfisher
- Ultramarine lorikeet
- Uluguru bushshrike
- Uluguru mountain greenbul
- Uluguru violet-backed sunbird
- Unadorned flycatcher
- Undulated antpitta
- Undulated antshrike
- Undulated tinamou
- Unicolored antwren
- Unicolored blackbird
- Unicolored jay
- Unicolored tapaculo
- Unicolored thrush
- Uniform antshrike
- Uniform crake
- Uniform finch
- Uniform swiftlet
- Uniform treehunter
- Uniform woodcreeper
- Unspotted saw-whet owl
- Unstreaked tit-tyrant
- Upcher's warbler
- Upland antshrike
- Upland buzzard
- Upland goose
- Upland pipit
- Upland sandpiper
- Ural owl
- Urich's tyrannulet
- Urrao antpitta
- Ursula's sunbird
- Urubamba antpitta
- Usambara akalat
- Usambara double-collared sunbird
- Usambara hyliota
- Usambara thrush
- Usambara weaver
- Ussher's flycatcher
- Utcubamba tapaculo
- Utupua whistler

== V ==
- Vampire ground finch
- Van Dam's vanga
- Van Hasselt's sunbird
- Vanikoro flycatcher
- Vanikoro island thrush
- Vanikoro monarch
- Vanikoro whistler
- Vanikoro white-eye
- Vanuatu imperial pigeon
- Vanuatu kingfisher
- Vanuatu megapode
- Vanuatu streaked fantail
- Vanuatu white-eye
- Variable antshrike
- Variable goshawk
- Variable hawk
- Variable limestone babbler
- Variable oriole
- Variable oystercatcher
- Variable seedeater
- Variable sunbird
- Variable wheatear
- Variable woodpecker
- Varied bunting
- Varied honeyeater
- Varied lorikeet
- Varied sittella
- Varied solitaire
- Varied thrush
- Varied tit
- Varied triller
- Variegated antpitta
- Variegated bristle tyrant
- Variegated fairywren
- Variegated flycatcher
- Variegated laughingthrush
- Variegated tinamou
- Varzea piculet
- Varzea schiffornis
- Várzea thrush
- Vaux's swift
- Veery
- Vega gull
- Vegetarian finch
- Vella Lavella monarch
- Vella Lavella white-eye
- Velvet asity
- Velvet flycatcher
- Velvet scoter
- Velvet-browed brilliant
- Velvet-fronted euphonia
- Velvet-fronted grackle
- Velvet-fronted nuthatch
- Velvet-mantled drongo
- Velvet-purple coronet
- Velvety black tyrant
- Velvety manakin
- Venezuelan beardless tyrannulet
- Venezuelan bristle tyrant
- Venezuelan flowerpiercer
- Venezuelan flycatcher
- Venezuelan parakeet
- Venezuelan sylph
- Venezuelan troupial
- Venezuelan tyrannulet
- Venezuelan wood quail
- Ventriloquial oriole
- Veracruz wren
- Veraguan mango
- Verdin
- Verditer flycatcher
- Vermiculated fishing owl
- Vermilion cardinal
- Vermilion flycatcher
- Vermilion tanager
- Vernal hanging parrot
- Verreaux's coua
- Verreaux's eagle
- Verreaux's eagle-owl
- Versicolored barbet
- Versicolored emerald
- Vervain hummingbird
- Vesper sparrow
- Victoria crowned pigeon
- Victoria's riflebird
- Victorin's warbler
- Vieillot's barbet
- Vieillot's black weaver
- Vietnamese crested argus
- Vietnamese cutia
- Vietnamese greenfinch
- Vigors's sunbird
- Vilcabamba brushfinch
- Vilcabamba spinetail
- Vilcabamba tapaculo
- Vilcabamba thistletail
- Village indigobird
- Village weaver
- Vinaceous dove
- Vinaceous rosefinch
- Vinaceous-breasted amazon
- Vinous-breasted myna
- Vinous-breasted sparrowhawk
- Vinous-throated parrotbill
- Violaceous coucal
- Violaceous euphonia
- Violaceous jay
- Violaceous quail-dove
- Violet crow
- Violet cuckoo
- Violet sabrewing
- Violet turaco
- Violet wood hoopoe
- Violet-backed hyliota
- Violet-backed starling
- Violet-bellied hummingbird
- Violet-breasted sunbird
- Violet-capped hummingbird
- Violet-capped woodnymph
- Violet-chested hummingbird
- Violet-crowned hummingbird
- Violet-eared waxbill
- Violet-fronted brilliant
- Violet-green swallow
- Violet-headed hummingbird
- Violet-necked lory
- Violet-tailed sunbird
- Violet-tailed sylph
- Violet-throated metaltail
- Violet-throated starfrontlet
- Virginia rail
- Virginia's warbler
- Viridian dacnis
- Viridian metaltail
- Visayan babbler
- Visayan blue fantail
- Visayan broadbill
- Visayan bulbul
- Visayan cuckooshrike
- Visayan fantail
- Visayan hornbill
- Visayan miniature babbler
- Visayan pygmy babbler
- Visayan rhabdornis
- Visayan shama
- Visayan tailorbird
- Vitelline masked weaver
- Vitelline warbler
- Vogelkop bowerbird
- Vogelkop lophorina
- Vogelkop melidectes
- Vogelkop owlet-nightjar
- Vogelkop scrubwren
- Vogelkop whistler
- Volcano hummingbird
- Volcano junco
- Volcano swiftlet
- Von der Decken's hornbill
- Von Schrenck's bittern
- Vulturine guineafowl
- Vulturine parrot

== W ==
- Wahlberg's eagle
- Wahnes's parotia
- Waigeo brushturkey
- Wailing cisticola
- Wakatobi white-eye
- †Wake Island rail
- Wakolo myzomela
- Walden's hornbill
- Wallace's fairywren
- Wallace's fruit dove
- Wallace's hanging parrot
- Wallace's hawk-eagle
- Wallace's owlet-nightjar
- Wallace's scops owl
- Wallacean cuckooshrike
- Wallacean drongo
- Wallacean island thrush
- Wallacean whistler
- Wallcreeper
- Waller's starling
- Wandering tattler
- Wandering whistling duck
- Wangi-wangi white-eye
- Warbling doradito
- Warbling masked flowerpiercer
- Warbling white-eye
- Ward's trogon
- Ward's vanga
- Warsangli linnet
- Water pipit
- Water rail
- Water thick-knee
- Watercock
- Watkins's antpitta
- Wattled broadbill
- Wattled brushturkey
- Wattled crane
- Wattled curassow
- Wattled guan
- Wattled ibis
- Wattled jacana
- Wattled ploughbill
- Wattled smoky honeyeater
- Wattled starling
- Waved albatross
- Wayanad laughingthrush
- Wedge-billed woodcreeper
- Wedge-rumped storm petrel
- Wedge-tailed eagle
- Wedge-tailed grass finch
- Wedge-tailed green pigeon
- Wedge-tailed hillstar
- Wedge-tailed jery
- Wedge-tailed sabrewing
- Wedge-tailed shearwater
- Weebill
- Weka
- Welcome swallow
- West African batis
- West African crested tern
- West African pied hornbill
- West African seedeater
- West African wattle-eye
- West Himalayan bush warbler
- West Indian whistling duck
- West Indian woodpecker
- West Mexican chachalaca
- West Mexican euphonia
- West Papuan lorikeet
- West Peruvian dove
- West Peruvian screech owl
- West Solomons owl
- Western alpine mannikin
- Western banded snake eagle
- Western barn owl
- Western bearded greenbul
- Western black-eared wheatear
- Western black-headed batis
- Western bluebill
- Western bluebird
- Western Bonelli's warbler
- Western bowerbird
- Western bristlebird
- Western bronze-naped pigeon
- Western capercaillie
- Western cattle egret
- Western chat-tanager
- Western citril
- Western corella
- Western crested berrypecker
- Western crested guineafowl
- Western crowned pigeon
- Western crowned warbler
- Western dwarf hornbill
- Western emerald
- Western fieldwren
- Western fire-eye
- Western flycatcher
- Western gerygone
- Western grasswren
- Western grebe
- Western gull
- Western hemispingus
- Western hooded pitta
- Western house martin
- Western jackdaw
- Western kingbird
- Western long-tailed hornbill
- Western marsh harrier
- Western marsh wren
- Western meadowlark
- Western miombo sunbird
- Western mountain greenbul
- Western nicator
- Western olivaceous flatbill
- Western olivaceous warbler
- Western oriole
- Western Orphean warbler
- Western parotia
- Western plantain-eater
- Western quail-thrush
- Western red-billed hornbill
- Western red-legged thrush
- Western reef heron
- Western rock nuthatch
- Western rockhopper penguin
- Western rosella
- Western sandpiper
- Western screech owl
- Western shriketit
- Western spindalis
- Western spinebill
- Western striolated puffbird
- Western subalpine warbler
- Western tanager
- Western thornbill
- Western tinkerbird
- Western tragopan
- Western violet-backed sunbird
- Western warbling vireo
- Western wattlebird
- Western wattled cuckooshrike
- Western whipbird
- Western wood pewee
- Western woodhaunter
- Western yellow robin
- Western yellow wagtail
- Western yellow-billed barbet
- Westland petrel
- Wetar figbird
- Wetar ground dove
- Wetar myzomela
- Wetar oriole
- Wetar scops owl
- Weyns's weaver
- Whinchat
- Whiskered auklet
- Whiskered flowerpecker
- Whiskered myiobius
- Whiskered pitta
- Whiskered screech owl
- Whiskered tern
- Whiskered treeswift
- Whiskered wren
- Whiskered yuhina
- Whistler's warbler
- Whistling cisticola
- Whistling dove
- Whistling green pigeon
- Whistling heron
- Whistling kite
- Whistling long-tailed woodcreeper
- Whistling masked flowerpiercer
- Whistling warbler
- White bellbird
- White cockatoo
- White eared pheasant
- White hawk
- White monjita
- White stork
- †White swamphen
- White wagtail
- White woodpecker
- White-backed black tit
- White-backed duck
- White-backed mousebird
- White-backed night heron
- White-backed swallow
- White-backed thrush
- White-backed vulture
- White-backed woodpecker
- White-backed woodswallow
- White-banded mockingbird
- White-banded swallow
- White-banded tyrannulet
- White-barred piculet
- White-bearded antshrike
- White-bearded flycatcher
- White-bearded greenbul
- White-bearded helmetcrest
- White-bearded hermit
- White-bearded manakin
- White-bellied antbird
- White-bellied antpitta
- White-bellied blue flycatcher
- White-bellied blue robin
- White-bellied bush chat
- White-bellied bustard
- White-bellied canary
- White-bellied chachalaca
- White-bellied cinclodes
- White-bellied crested flycatcher
- White-bellied cuckooshrike
- White-bellied dacnis
- White-bellied drongo
- White-bellied emerald
- White-bellied erpornis
- White-bellied fantail
- White-bellied go-away-bird
- White-bellied goshawk
- White-bellied green pigeon
- White-bellied heron
- White-bellied honeyeater
- White-bellied hummingbird
- White-bellied imperial pigeon
- White-bellied kingfisher
- White-bellied minivet
- White-bellied mountaingem
- White-bellied munia
- White-bellied nothura
- White-bellied parrot
- White-bellied piculet
- White-bellied pitohui
- White-bellied pygmy tyrant
- White-bellied redstart
- White-bellied robin-chat
- White-bellied sea eagle
- White-bellied seedeater
- White-bellied seedsnipe
- White-bellied spinetail
- White-bellied storm petrel
- White-bellied sunbird
- White-bellied tanager
- White-bellied thicket fantail
- White-bellied tit
- White-bellied tody-tyrant
- White-bellied treepie
- White-bellied whistler
- White-bellied woodpecker
- White-bellied woodstar
- White-bellied wren
- White-bibbed antbird
- White-bibbed babbler
- White-bibbed fruit dove
- White-bibbed manakin
- White-bibbed swallow
- White-billed buffalo weaver
- White-billed crow
- White-billed starling
- White-breasted antbird
- White-breasted babbler
- White-breasted cuckooshrike
- White-breasted ground dove
- White-breasted guineafowl
- White-breasted mesite
- White-breasted nigrita
- White-breasted nuthatch
- White-breasted parakeet
- White-breasted parrotbill
- White-breasted robin
- White-breasted tapaculo
- White-breasted waterhen
- White-breasted whistler
- White-breasted wood wren
- White-breasted woodswallow
- White-bridled finch
- White-browed antbird
- White-browed antpitta
- White-browed babbler
- White-browed brushfinch
- White-browed bulbul
- White-browed bush chat
- White-browed bush robin
- White-browed chat-tyrant
- White-browed conebill
- White-browed coucal
- White-browed crake
- White-browed crombec
- White-browed fantail
- White-browed foliage-gleaner
- White-browed forest flycatcher
- White-browed fulvetta
- White-browed gnatcatcher
- White-browed ground tyrant
- White-browed guan
- White-browed hawk
- White-browed hermit
- White-browed jungle flycatcher
- White-browed laughingthrush
- White-browed meadowlark
- White-browed nuthatch
- White-browed owl
- White-browed piculet
- White-browed purpletuft
- White-browed robin
- White-browed robin-chat
- White-browed scimitar babbler
- White-browed scrub robin
- White-browed scrubwren
- White-browed shama
- White-browed shrike-babbler
- White-browed sparrow-weaver
- White-browed spinetail
- White-browed tapaculo
- White-browed tit
- White-browed tit-spinetail
- White-browed tit-warbler
- White-browed treecreeper
- White-browed triller
- White-browed wagtail
- White-browed woodswallow
- White-capped bunting
- White-capped dipper
- White-capped fruit dove
- White-capped monarch
- White-capped munia
- White-capped redstart
- White-capped tanager
- White-cheeked antbird
- White-cheeked barbet
- White-cheeked bullfinch
- White-cheeked bushtit
- White-cheeked cotinga
- White-cheeked honeyeater
- White-cheeked laughingthrush
- White-cheeked nuthatch
- White-cheeked partridge
- White-cheeked pintail
- White-cheeked starling
- White-cheeked tern
- White-cheeked tody-flycatcher
- White-cheeked turaco
- White-chested alethe
- White-chested babbler
- White-chested emerald
- White-chested puffbird
- White-chested swift
- †White-chested white-eye
- White-chinned jacamar
- White-chinned myzomela
- White-chinned petrel
- White-chinned prinia
- White-chinned sapphire
- White-chinned swift
- White-chinned thistletail
- White-chinned thrush
- White-chinned woodcreeper
- White-collared blackbird
- White-collared foliage-gleaner
- White-collared jay
- White-collared kite
- White-collared manakin
- White-collared monarch
- White-collared oliveback
- White-collared pigeon
- White-collared starling
- White-collared swift
- White-collared yuhina
- White-crested coquette
- White-crested elaenia
- White-crested guan
- White-crested helmetshrike
- White-crested laughingthrush
- White-crested spadebill
- White-crested tiger heron
- White-crested turaco
- White-crested tyrannulet
- White-crowned cuckoo
- White-crowned hornbill
- White-crowned lapwing
- White-crowned manakin
- White-crowned parrot
- White-crowned penduline tit
- White-crowned pigeon
- White-crowned robin-chat
- White-crowned shama
- White-crowned sparrow
- White-crowned starling
- White-crowned tapaculo
- White-crowned wheatear
- White-eared barbet
- White-eared bronze cuckoo
- White-eared brown dove
- White-eared bulbul
- White-eared catbird
- White-eared conebill
- White-eared ground sparrow
- White-eared honeyeater
- White-eared hummingbird
- White-eared jacamar
- White-eared monarch
- White-eared myza
- White-eared night heron
- White-eared parakeet
- White-eared puffbird
- White-eared sibia
- White-eared solitaire
- White-eared tailorbird
- White-edged oriole
- White-eyed attila
- White-eyed buzzard
- White-eyed foliage-gleaner
- White-eyed gull
- White-eyed parakeet
- White-eyed river martin
- White-eyed robin
- White-eyed slaty flycatcher
- White-eyed starling
- White-eyed stipplethroat
- White-eyed thrush
- White-eyed tody-tyrant
- White-eyed vireo
- White-faced cuckoo-dove
- White-faced heron
- White-faced ibis
- White-faced nunbird
- White-faced plover
- White-faced quail-dove
- White-faced robin
- White-faced starling
- White-faced storm petrel
- White-faced whistling duck
- White-faced whitestart
- White-flanked antwren
- White-flanked sunbird
- White-fronted amazon
- White-fronted bee-eater
- White-fronted black chat
- White-fronted chat
- White-fronted falconet
- White-fronted ground dove
- White-fronted ground tyrant
- White-fronted honeyeater
- White-fronted manakin
- White-fronted nunbird
- White-fronted plover
- White-fronted quail-dove
- White-fronted scops owl
- White-fronted swift
- White-fronted tern
- White-fronted tit
- White-fronted tyrannulet
- White-fronted wattle-eye
- White-fronted whitestart
- White-fronted woodpecker
- White-gaped honeyeater
- White-gorgeted fantail
- White-gorgeted flycatcher
- White-headed babbler
- White-headed barbet
- White-headed brushfinch
- White-headed buffalo weaver
- White-headed bulbul
- White-headed duck
- White-headed fruit dove
- White-headed island thrush
- White-headed marsh tyrant
- White-headed mousebird
- White-headed munia
- White-headed petrel
- White-headed pigeon
- White-headed robin-chat
- White-headed saw-wing
- White-headed starling
- White-headed vanga
- White-headed vulture
- White-headed wood hoopoe
- White-headed woodpecker
- White-headed wren
- White-hooded babbler
- White-lined antbird
- White-lined honeyeater
- White-lined tanager
- White-lored antpitta
- White-lored euphonia
- White-lored gnatcatcher
- White-lored oriole
- White-lored spinetail
- White-lored tyrannulet
- White-lored warbler
- White-mantled barbet
- White-mantled kingfisher
- White-masked antbird
- White-naped brushfinch
- White-naped crane
- White-naped honeyeater
- White-naped jay
- White-naped lory
- White-naped monarch
- White-naped pigeon
- White-naped seedeater
- White-naped swift
- White-naped tit
- White-naped woodpecker
- White-naped xenopsaris
- White-naped yuhina
- White-necked babbler
- White-necked coucal
- White-necked crow
- White-necked hawk
- White-necked heron
- White-necked jacobin
- White-necked laughingthrush
- White-necked myna
- White-necked petrel
- White-necked puffbird
- White-necked raven
- White-necked rockfowl
- White-necklaced partridge
- White-plumed antbird
- White-plumed honeyeater
- White-quilled rock pigeon
- White-rimmed brushfinch
- White-rimmed warbler
- White-ringed flycatcher
- White-ruffed manakin
- White-rumped babbler
- White-rumped cuckooshrike
- White-rumped falcon
- White-rumped hawk
- White-rumped kingfisher
- White-rumped monjita
- White-rumped munia
- White-rumped robin
- White-rumped sandpiper
- White-rumped seedeater
- White-rumped shama
- White-rumped sirystes
- White-rumped snowfinch
- White-rumped spinetail
- White-rumped swallow
- White-rumped swift
- White-rumped swiftlet
- White-rumped tanager
- White-rumped triller
- White-rumped vulture
- White-shouldered antbird
- White-shouldered antshrike
- White-shouldered black tit
- White-shouldered fairywren
- White-shouldered fire-eye
- White-shouldered ibis
- White-shouldered starling
- White-shouldered tanager
- White-shouldered triller
- White-sided flowerpiercer
- White-sided hillstar
- White-speckled laughingthrush
- White-spectacled bulbul
- White-spectacled warbler
- White-spotted fantail
- White-spotted flufftail
- White-spotted mannikin
- White-spotted wattle-eye
- White-spotted woodpecker
- White-starred robin
- White-streaked antvireo
- White-streaked friarbird
- White-streaked honeyeater
- White-striped forest rail
- White-striped warbler
- White-striped woodcreeper
- White-tailed alethe
- White-tailed ant thrush
- White-tailed blue flycatcher
- White-tailed cisticola
- White-tailed cotinga
- White-tailed crested flycatcher
- White-tailed eagle
- White-tailed emerald
- White-tailed flycatcher
- White-tailed goldenthroat
- White-tailed hawk
- White-tailed hummingbird
- White-tailed jay
- White-tailed kite
- White-tailed lapwing
- White-tailed lark
- White-tailed nightjar
- White-tailed nuthatch
- White-tailed ptarmigan
- White-tailed robin
- White-tailed sabrewing
- White-tailed shrike
- White-tailed shrike-tyrant
- White-tailed starfrontlet
- White-tailed stonechat
- White-tailed swallow
- White-tailed tityra
- White-tailed trogon
- White-tailed tropicbird
- White-tailed tyrannulet
- White-tailed warbler
- White-thighed hornbill
- White-thighed swallow
- White-throated antbird
- White-throated antpitta
- White-throated babbler
- White-throated barbtail
- White-throated bee-eater
- White-throated bulbul
- White-throated bush chat
- White-throated bushtit
- White-throated cacholote
- White-throated canary
- White-throated caracara
- White-throated crake
- White-throated daggerbill
- White-throated dipper
- White-throated earthcreeper
- White-throated fantail
- White-throated Fiji whistler
- White-throated flycatcher
- White-throated francolin
- White-throated gerygone
- White-throated grasswren
- White-throated greenbul
- White-throated ground dove
- White-throated hawk
- White-throated honeyeater
- White-throated hummingbird
- White-throated jacamar
- White-throated jay
- White-throated jungle flycatcher
- White-throated kingbird
- White-throated kingfisher
- White-throated laughingthrush
- White-throated magpie-jay
- White-throated manakin
- White-throated mountain babbler
- White-throated mountaingem
- White-throated needletail
- White-throated nightjar
- White-throated oxylabes
- White-throated pewee
- White-throated piping guan
- White-throated quail-dove
- White-throated rail
- White-throated redstart
- White-throated robin
- White-throated robin-chat
- White-throated rock thrush
- White-throated screech owl
- White-throated seedeater
- White-throated shrike-tanager
- White-throated sierra finch
- White-throated spadebill
- White-throated sparrow
- White-throated swallow
- White-throated swift
- White-throated tapaculo
- White-throated thrush
- White-throated tinamou
- White-throated toucan
- White-throated towhee
- White-throated treecreeper
- White-throated treerunner
- White-throated tyrannulet
- White-throated woodcreeper
- White-throated woodpecker
- White-throated wren-babbler
- White-tipped dove
- White-tipped plantcutter
- White-tipped quetzal
- White-tipped sicklebill
- White-tipped swift
- White-tufted grebe
- White-tufted sunbeam
- White-vented euphonia
- White-vented plumeleteer
- White-vented shama
- White-vented violetear
- White-vented whistler
- White-wedged piculet
- White-whiskered hermit
- White-whiskered laughingthrush
- White-whiskered puffbird
- White-whiskered spinetail
- White-winged apalis
- White-winged becard
- White-winged black tit
- White-winged black tyrant
- White-winged brushfinch
- White-winged chough
- White-winged cinclodes
- White-winged cliff chat
- White-winged collared dove
- White-winged coot
- White-winged cotinga
- White-winged cuckooshrike
- White-winged dove
- White-winged duck
- White-winged fairywren
- White-winged fantail
- White-winged flufftail
- White-winged grosbeak
- White-winged guan
- White-winged lark
- White-winged magpie
- White-winged nightjar
- White-winged parakeet
- White-winged potoo
- White-winged robin
- White-winged scoter
- White-winged shrike-tanager
- White-winged snowfinch
- White-winged swallow
- White-winged swamp warbler
- White-winged tanager
- White-winged tapaculo
- White-winged tern
- White-winged triller
- White-winged warbler
- White-winged widowbird
- White-winged woodpecker
- White's thrush
- Whitehead
- Whitehead's broadbill
- Whitehead's spiderhunter
- Whitehead's swiftlet
- Whitehead's trogon
- Whooper swan
- Whooping crane
- Whooping motmot
- Whyte's barbet
- Whyte's francolin
- Wied's tyrant-manakin
- Wild turkey
- Wilkins's finch
- Willard's sooty boubou
- Willcocks's honeyguide
- Williams's lark
- Williamson's sapsucker
- Willie wagtail
- Willis's antbird
- Willow flycatcher
- Willow ptarmigan
- Willow tit
- Willow warbler
- Wilson's bird-of-paradise
- Wilson's indigobird
- Wilson's phalarope
- Wilson's plover
- Wilson's snipe
- Wilson's storm petrel
- Wilson's warbler
- Winding cisticola
- Wine-throated hummingbird
- Wing-banded antbird
- Wing-banded wren
- Wing-barred piprites
- Wing-barred seedeater
- Wing-snapping cisticola
- Winifred's warbler
- Winter wren
- Wire-crested thorntail
- Wire-tailed manakin
- Wire-tailed swallow
- Wompoo fruit dove
- Wonga pigeon
- Wood duck
- Wood pipit
- Wood sandpiper
- Wood snipe
- Wood stork
- Wood thrush
- Wood warbler
- Woodchat shrike
- Woodford's rail
- Woodhouse's antpecker
- Woodhouse's scrub jay
- Woodland kingfisher
- Woodlark
- Woodpecker finch
- Woodwards' batis
- Worm-eating warbler
- Worthen's sparrow
- Wreathed hornbill
- Wren-like rushbird
- Wrenthrush
- Wrentit
- Wrinkled hornbill
- Writhed hornbill
- Wrybill

== X ==
- Xantus's hummingbird
- Xavier's greenbul
- Xingu scale-backed antbird
- Xingu scythebill
- Xinjiang ground jay

== Y ==
- Yap cicadabird
- Yap monarch
- Yapacana antbird
- Yellow bishop
- Yellow bittern
- Yellow bunting
- Yellow canary
- Yellow cardinal
- Yellow chat
- Yellow grosbeak
- Yellow honeyeater
- Yellow longbill
- Yellow oriole
- Yellow penduline tit
- Yellow rail
- Yellow thornbill
- Yellow tit
- Yellow tyrannulet
- Yellow wattlebird
- Yellow-backed oriole
- Yellow-backed tanager
- Yellow-bearded greenbul
- Yellow-bellied bulbul
- Yellow-bellied bush warbler
- Yellow-bellied chat-tyrant
- Yellow-bellied dacnis
- Yellow-bellied elaenia
- Yellow-bellied eremomela
- Yellow-bellied fantail
- Yellow-bellied flowerpecker
- Yellow-bellied flycatcher
- Yellow-bellied flyrobin
- Yellow-bellied gerygone
- Yellow-bellied greenbul
- Yellow-bellied hyliota
- Yellow-bellied longbill
- Yellow-bellied prinia
- Yellow-bellied sapsucker
- Yellow-bellied seedeater
- Yellow-bellied siskin
- Yellow-bellied sunbird-asity
- Yellow-bellied tanager
- Yellow-bellied tit
- Yellow-bellied tyrannulet
- Yellow-bellied warbler
- Yellow-bellied wattle-eye
- Yellow-bellied waxbill
- Yellow-bellied whistler
- Yellow-bibbed fruit dove
- Yellow-bibbed lory
- Yellow-billed amazon
- Yellow-billed babbler
- Yellow-billed blue magpie
- Yellow-billed cacique
- Yellow-billed cardinal
- Yellow-billed cotinga
- Yellow-billed cuckoo
- Yellow-billed duck
- Yellow-billed egret
- Yellow-billed giant honeyeater
- Yellow-billed jacamar
- Yellow-billed kingfisher
- Yellow-billed loon
- Yellow-billed lorikeet
- Yellow-billed magpie
- Yellow-billed malkoha
- Yellow-billed nunbird
- Yellow-billed nuthatch
- Yellow-billed oxpecker
- Yellow-billed pintail
- Yellow-billed shrike
- Yellow-billed spoonbill
- Yellow-billed stork
- Yellow-billed teal
- Yellow-billed tern
- Yellow-billed tit-tyrant
- Yellow-billed turaco
- Yellow-billed whistling thrush
- Yellow-breasted antpitta
- Yellow-breasted antwren
- Yellow-breasted apalis
- Yellow-breasted barbet
- Yellow-breasted boatbill
- Yellow-breasted boubou
- Yellow-breasted bowerbird
- Yellow-breasted brushfinch
- Yellow-breasted bunting
- Yellow-breasted chat
- Yellow-breasted crake
- Yellow-breasted flowerpecker
- Yellow-breasted forest robin
- Yellow-breasted fruit dove
- Yellow-breasted greenfinch
- Yellow-breasted pipit
- Yellow-breasted racket-tail
- Yellow-breasted satinbird
- Yellow-breasted tailorbird
- Yellow-breasted warbler
- Yellow-breasted warbling antbird
- Yellow-bridled finch
- Yellow-browed antbird
- Yellow-browed bulbul
- Yellow-browed bunting
- Yellow-browed camaroptera
- Yellow-browed melidectes
- Yellow-browed seedeater
- Yellow-browed shrike-vireo
- Yellow-browed sparrow
- Yellow-browed tit
- Yellow-browed tody-flycatcher
- Yellow-browed toucanet
- Yellow-browed tyrant
- Yellow-browed warbler
- Yellow-browed woodpecker
- Yellow-capped pygmy parrot
- Yellow-capped weaver
- Yellow-casqued hornbill
- Yellow-cheeked lorikeet
- Yellow-cheeked tit
- Yellow-chevroned parakeet
- Yellow-chinned spinetail
- Yellow-chinned sunbird
- Yellow-collared chlorophonia
- Yellow-collared lovebird
- Yellow-crested cockatoo
- Yellow-crested helmetshrike
- Yellow-crested manakin
- Yellow-crested tanager
- Yellow-crested woodpecker
- Yellow-crowned amazon
- Yellow-crowned barbet
- Yellow-crowned bishop
- Yellow-crowned canary
- Yellow-crowned elaenia
- Yellow-crowned euphonia
- Yellow-crowned flowerpecker
- Yellow-crowned gonolek
- Yellow-crowned kakariki
- Yellow-crowned night heron
- Yellow-crowned tyrannulet
- Yellow-crowned whitestart
- Yellow-crowned woodpecker
- Yellow-eared barbet
- Yellow-eared bulbul
- Yellow-eared parrot
- Yellow-eared spiderhunter
- Yellow-eared toucanet
- Yellow-eared woodpecker
- Yellow-eyed babbler
- Yellow-eyed black flycatcher
- Yellow-eyed bristlebill
- Yellow-eyed junco
- Yellow-eyed penguin
- Yellow-eyed pigeon
- Yellow-eyed starling
- Yellow-faced flameback
- Yellow-faced grassquit
- Yellow-faced honeyeater
- Yellow-faced myna
- Yellow-faced parrot
- Yellow-faced parrotlet
- Yellow-faced siskin
- Yellow-footed flycatcher
- Yellow-footed green pigeon
- Yellow-footed gull
- Yellow-footed honeyguide
- Yellow-fronted barbet
- Yellow-fronted canary
- Yellow-fronted parrot
- Yellow-fronted tinkerbird
- Yellow-fronted woodpecker
- Yellow-gaped honeyeater
- Yellow-gorgeted greenbul
- Yellow-green brushfinch
- Yellow-green grosbeak
- Yellow-green tanager
- Yellow-green vireo
- Yellow-headed amazon
- Yellow-headed blackbird
- Yellow-headed brushfinch
- Yellow-headed caracara
- Yellow-headed manakin
- Yellow-headed warbler
- Yellow-hooded blackbird
- Yellow-knobbed curassow
- Yellow-legged buttonquail
- Yellow-legged flyrobin
- Yellow-legged gull
- Yellow-legged pigeon
- Yellow-legged thrush
- Yellow-legged tinamou
- Yellow-legged weaver
- Yellow-lored bristlebill
- Yellow-lored tanager
- Yellow-lored tody-flycatcher
- Yellow-mandibled sparrow
- Yellow-mantled weaver
- Yellow-mantled widowbird
- Yellow-margined flatbill
- Yellow-naped amazon
- Yellow-necked spurfowl
- Yellow-olive flatbill
- Yellow-plumed honeyeater
- Yellow-rumped antwren
- Yellow-rumped cacique
- Yellow-rumped flowerpecker
- Yellow-rumped flycatcher
- Yellow-rumped honeyguide
- Yellow-rumped mannikin
- Yellow-rumped marshbird
- Yellow-rumped seedeater
- Yellow-rumped siskin
- Yellow-rumped thornbill
- Yellow-rumped tinkerbird
- Yellow-rumped warbler
- Yellow-scarfed tanager
- Yellow-shouldered amazon
- Yellow-shouldered blackbird
- Yellow-shouldered grassquit
- Yellow-shouldered grosbeak
- Yellow-sided flowerpecker
- Yellow-spectacled heleia
- Yellow-spotted barbet
- Yellow-spotted bush sparrow
- Yellow-spotted honeyeater
- Yellow-streaked greenbul
- Yellow-streaked lory
- Yellow-streaked warbler
- Yellow-striped brushfinch
- Yellow-tailed black cockatoo
- Yellow-tailed oriole
- Yellow-thighed brushfinch
- Yellow-throated antwren
- Yellow-throated apalis
- Yellow-throated bulbul
- Yellow-throated bunting
- Yellow-throated bush sparrow
- Yellow-throated chlorospingus
- Yellow-throated cuckoo
- Yellow-throated euphonia
- Yellow-throated Fiji whistler
- Yellow-throated flycatcher
- Yellow-throated fulvetta
- Yellow-throated hanging parrot
- Yellow-throated honeyeater
- Yellow-throated laughingthrush
- Yellow-throated leafbird
- Yellow-throated longclaw
- Yellow-throated miner
- Yellow-throated mountain greenbul
- Yellow-throated nicator
- Yellow-throated nightingale-thrush
- Yellow-throated sandgrouse
- Yellow-throated scrubwren
- Yellow-throated seedeater
- Yellow-throated spadebill
- Yellow-throated sparrow
- Yellow-throated tanager
- Yellow-throated tinkerbird
- Yellow-throated toucan
- Yellow-throated vireo
- Yellow-throated warbler
- Yellow-throated whistler
- Yellow-throated white-eye
- Yellow-throated woodland warbler
- Yellow-throated woodpecker
- Yellow-tinted honeyeater
- Yellow-tufted dacnis
- Yellow-tufted honeyeater
- Yellow-tufted woodpecker
- Yellow-vented bulbul
- Yellow-vented eremomela
- Yellow-vented flowerpecker
- Yellow-vented green pigeon
- Yellow-vented warbler
- Yellow-vented woodpecker
- Yellow-wattled bulbul
- Yellow-wattled lapwing
- Yellow-whiskered chlorospingus
- Yellow-whiskered greenbul
- Yellow-winged blackbird
- Yellow-winged flatbill
- Yellow-winged pytilia
- Yellow-winged tanager
- Yellow-winged vireo
- Yellowhammer
- Yellowhead
- Yellowish bulbul
- Yellowish flycatcher
- Yellowish imperial pigeon
- Yellowish pipit
- Yellowish white-eye
- Yellowish-streaked honeyeater
- Yemen linnet
- Yemen serin
- Yemen thrush
- Yemen warbler
- Yucatan amazon
- Yucatan bobwhite
- Yucatan flycatcher
- Yucatan gnatcatcher
- Yucatan jay
- Yucatan nightjar
- Yucatan poorwill
- Yucatan vireo
- Yucatan woodpecker
- Yucatan wren
- Yungas antwren
- Yungas dove
- Yungas guan
- Yungas manakin
- Yungas pygmy owl
- Yungas screech owl
- Yungas sparrow
- Yungas tody-tyrant
- Yungas tyrannulet
- Yungas warbler
- Yunnan fulvetta
- Yunnan nuthatch

== Z ==
- Zambezi indigobird
- Zamboanga bulbul
- Zanzibar red bishop
- Zapata rail
- Zapata sparrow
- Zapata wren
- Zappey's flycatcher
- Zarudny's sparrow
- Zebra dove
- Zebra finch
- Zebra woodpecker
- Zeledon's antbird
- Zenaida dove
- Zenker's honeyguide
- Zigzag heron
- Zimmer's tapaculo
- Zimmer's tody-tyrant
- Zimmer's woodcreeper
- Zino's petrel
- Zitting cisticola
- Zoe's imperial pigeon
- Zone-tailed hawk

== See also ==
- List of birds
- Lists of birds by region
