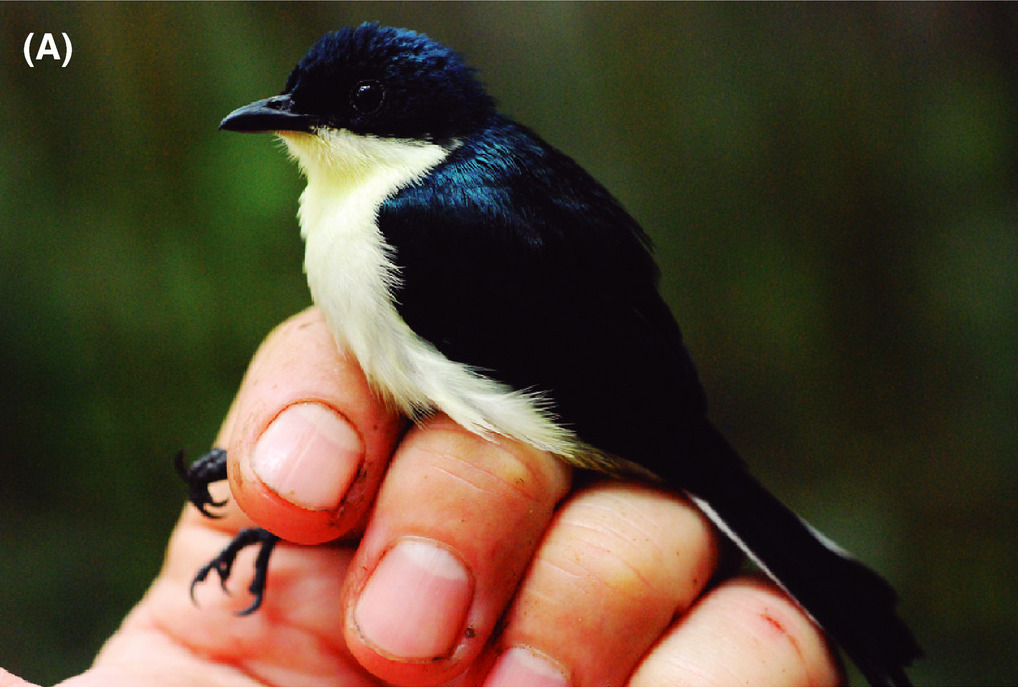
- male

Conservation status
- Least Concern (IUCN 3.1)

Scientific classification
- Kingdom: Animalia
- Phylum: Chordata
- Class: Aves
- Order: Passeriformes
- Family: Melanocharitidae
- Genus: Melanocharis
- Species: M. citreola

Binomial name
- Melanocharis citreola Milá, Ashari & Thébaud, 2021
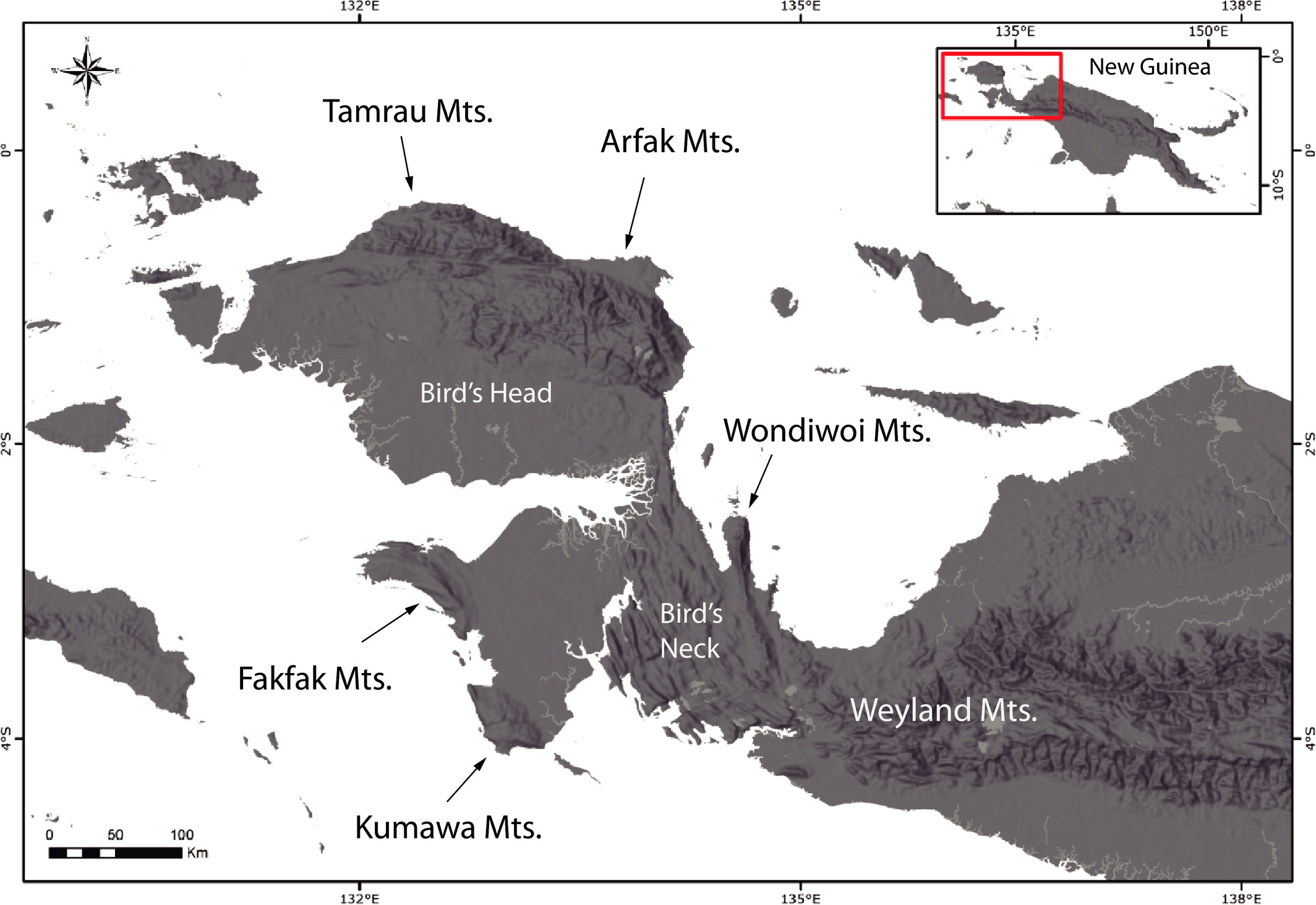
- Map showing the mountains of West Papua; the satin berrypecker inhabits the Kumawa and Fakfak Mountains

= Satin berrypecker =

Species of bird

The satin berrypecker (Melanocharis citreola) is a species of berrypecker in the family Melanocharitidae that was described in 2021. It is the only bird known to be endemic to the Bird's Neck in Western New Guinea, where it inhabits the Fakfak and Kumawa Mountains, two mountain ranges separated by 80 km of lowland rainforest. It inhabits mid-montane cloud forest with many ferns, mosses, and lichens and seems to prefer relatively open areas with sparser trees and more abundant tree ferns. It is known from elevations of 900 to 1,440 m (3,000 to 4,700 ft) in the Kumawa Mountains and 1,200 to 1,500 m (3,900 to 4,900 ft) in the Fakfak Mountains.

Adults have a length of 13–14 cm (5.1–5.5 in) and one adult male measured had a mass of 9.2 g (0.32 oz). Adult males have a blue-black face, iridescent blue-black crown, back, and rump, and a satiny-white throat, breast, belly, and vent with a yellow tint. The wing feathers are black and the underside of the wing is white, while the tail is entirely iridescent blue-black, excepting a white patch on the outermost rectrices. Male satin berrypeckers can be told apart from all other berrypeckers by their satin-white underparts. Female satin berrypeckers have not yet been definitively observed, but female berrypeckers putatively assigned to the species have been described as being olive-green overall, with paler yellow streaked underparts and black bills.

The species' ecology is mostly unstudied, but it is known to join mixed-species foraging flocks. The satin berrypecker is listed as being of least concern on the IUCN Red List as it inhabits some of the most inaccessible and minimally deforested areas in New Guinea. It has been described as uncommon to common in the Kumawa Mountains. Its abundance in the Fakfak Mountains is unknown due to the small number of observations.

== Taxonomy ==
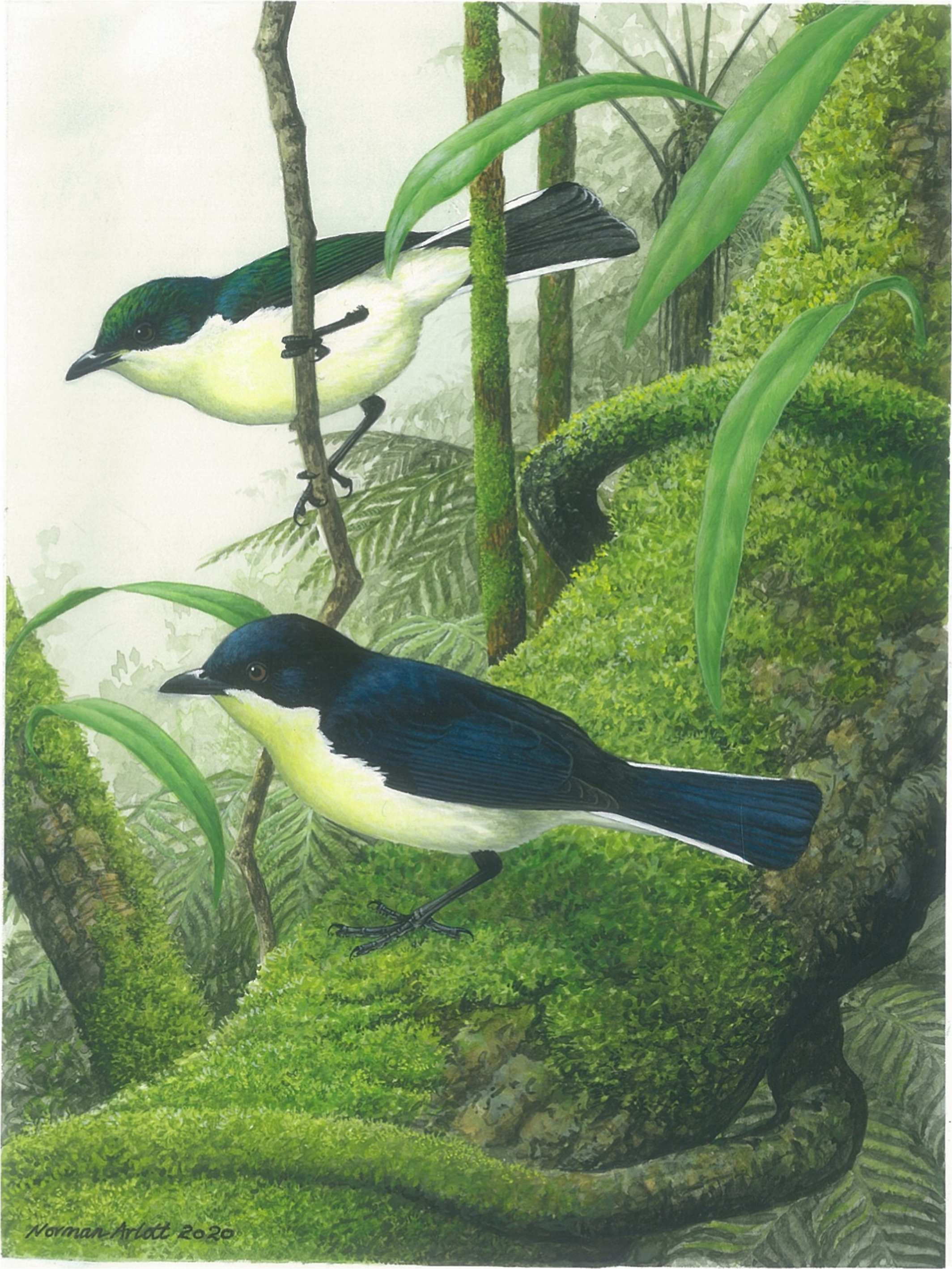
Illustration of male satin berrypeckers

The avian diversity of the mountainous regions of New Guinea is amongst the most poorly known in the world; the Bird's Neck, which connects the Bird's Head Peninsula to the rest of New Guinea, is especially understudied due to its treacherous karst terrain, steep slopes, and complete lack of surface freshwater at high elevations. Melanocharis berrypeckers with satiny-white underparts were first observed in the Fakfak Mountains in 1993; they were recognized as potentially representing a new species, but tentatively assigned to the similar mid-mountain berrypecker. Birds mist-netted during an earlier 1983 expedition in the Kumawa Mountains were probably also this species. The satin berrypecker was first seen for certain in 2013, with specimens first being collected during a November 2014 expedition to the Kumawa Mountains organized by the Bogor Zoology Museum and Research Institute for Development.

The species was described in 2021 as Melanocharis citreola by the Spanish ornithologist Borja Milá and his colleagues on the basis of an adult male specimen collected from the Kumawa Mountains in 2014. At that time, it was only the second species of bird to have been described from New Guinea in the preceding 80 years. The name of the genus, Melanocharis, is derived from the Ancient Greek words melas and kharis, meaning 'black beauty'. The specific epithet citreola is from the Modern Latin citreolus, meaning 'lemon-colored', and refers to the lemon-yellow wash on the white underparts of males. 'Satin berrypecker' is the official English common name designated by the International Ornithologists' Union (IOU). The species is known as Burungbuah Satin, Picabayas Satinado, and Piquebaie Satiné in Indonesian, Spanish, and French, respectively; all of these names, as well as the English name, refer to the male berrypecker's distinctive satin-white underparts.

The satin berrypecker is one of 6 species currently placed in the berrypecker genus Melanocharis, in the family Melanocharitidae. It has no subspecies. Within the genus, there are two clades that diverged 9.08 million years ago during the Late Miocene – one with the satin, streaked, and fan-tailed berrypeckers, and another with the obscure, mid-mountain, black, and thick-billed berrypeckers. The satin berrypicker is most closely related to the streaked berrypecker. The following cladogram shows relationships among the berrypeckers based on the study that described the satin berrypecker:

- Berrypeckers
  - - Obscure berrypecker (M. arfakiana)
    - - Spotted berrypecker (R. piperata)
      - - Mid-mountain berrypecker (M. longicauda)
        - Black berrypecker (M. nigra)
  - - Fan-tailed berrypecker (M. versteri)
    - - Streaked berrypecker (M. striativentris)
      - Satin berrypecker (M. citreola)

== Description ==
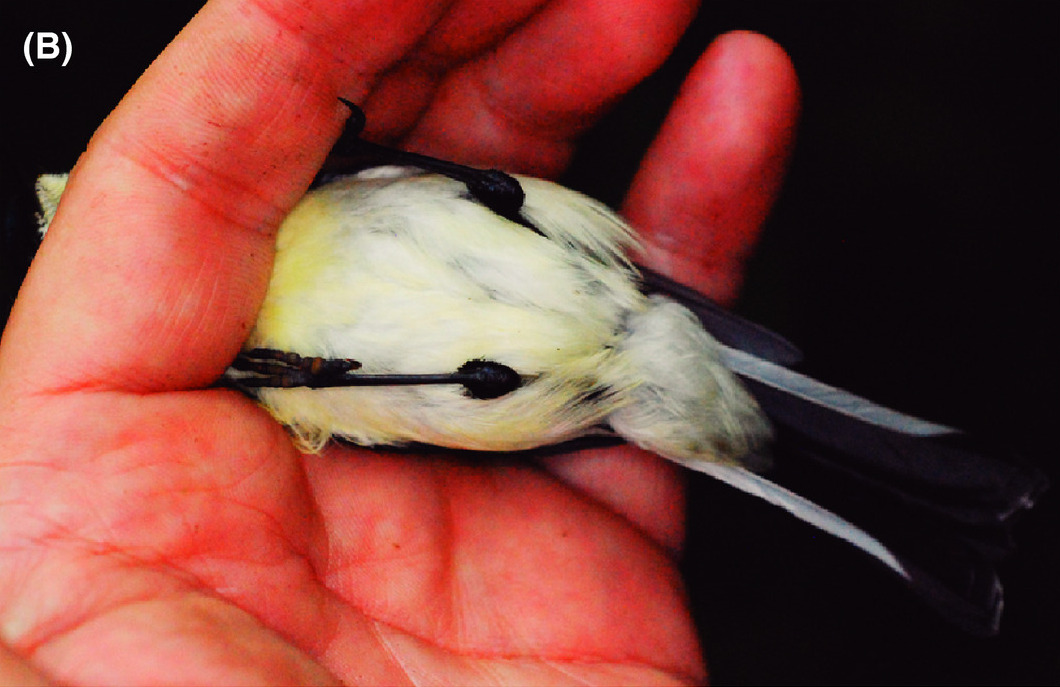
The satin berrypecker's satiny-white underparts are its most distinctive feature.

Adults have a length of 13–14 cm (5.1–5.5 in); one adult male measured had a mass of 9.2 g (0.32 oz). Wing lengths and tail lengths in adults males are 61–62 cm (24–24 in) and 49.5–50.5 cm (19.5–19.9 in), respectively. Immature males have been recorded having masses of 11.1–11.7 g (0.39–0.41 oz), wing lengths of 59.0–62.5 cm (23.2–24.6 in), and tail lengths of 46.5–48.0 cm (18.3–18.9 in). It is thought to be sexually dimorphic.

Adult males have an iridescent blue-black crown, back and rump. The face is blue-black, with a sharp malar line that separates it from the white throat. The throat, breast, belly, and vent are bright satiny-white with a lemon-yellow wash, especially pronounced on the throat, breast, and belly and lighter on the flanks. The underwing feathers are white and the wing feathers are black, with white internal edges on the primaries and secondaries. The thigh feathers are black and the tail feathers are entirely iridescent blue-black except for the outermost rectrices, which have 80% of the outer vane, including the feather rachis, coloured white. The last 3–4 mm (0.1–0.2 in) of the white patch tapers off towards the external edge of the vane. The bill and feet are black, while the iris is dark brown.

Females definitively identified as satin berrypeckers have not yet been collected; however, female berrypeckers putatively assigned to the species have been described as being olive-green overall, with paler yellow streaked underparts and black bills. Immature males share the yellow-tinted white underparts of adults, but have iridescent olive-green upperparts with interspersed blue-black feathers. The wing feathers are blackish with yellowish-olive outer edges. The central tail feathers are tinted olive, while the four outer rectrices have distal white or light grey spots. As in adults, the outermost rectrix has a white patch on its outer vane, but the patch is washed grey internally and excludes the rachis.

Male satin berrypeckers can be told apart from all other berrypeckers by their satin-white underparts. The mid-mountain berrypecker is smaller, with yellowish-grey underparts, and the white patch on its tail extends to the outermost two rectrices, compared to only one in the satin berrypecker. The fan-tailed berrypecker has a longer tail with more white, grey underparts, and is probably absent from the mountain ranges the satin berrypecker inhabits. Presumed female satin berrypeckers have been described as most closely resembling streaked berrypeckers, but lack the orange gape or rictal streak found in that species.

=== Vocalisations ===
The satin berrypecker's vocalisations are poorly studied; males are known to give high-pitched calls similar to the contact calls of the fan-tailed berrypecker when being handled, but these sounds may have been distress calls and unrepresentative of the satin berrypecker's usual vocalisations.

== Distribution and habitat ==
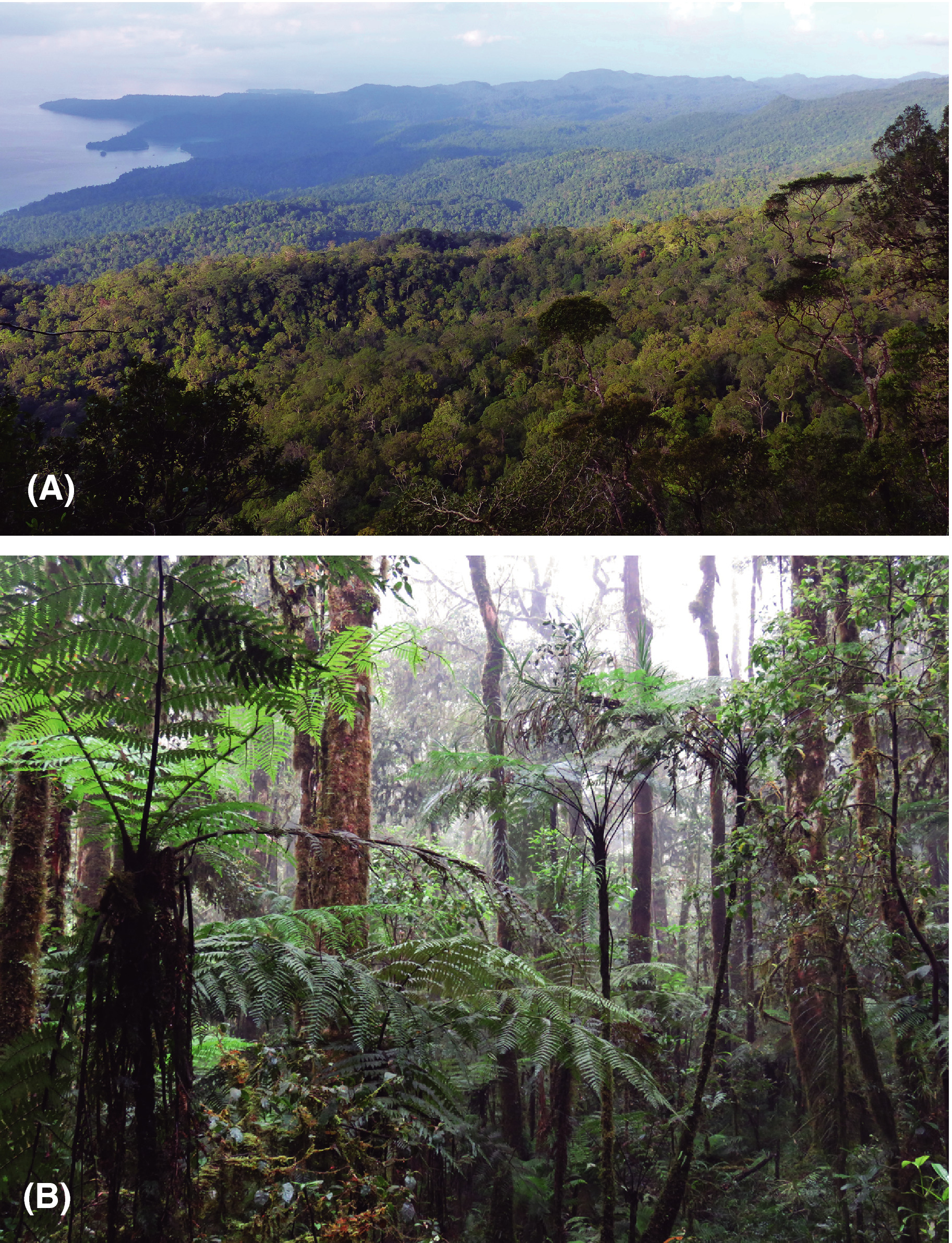
Habitat

The satin berrypecker is the only bird known to be endemic to the Bird's Neck Isthmus in Western New Guinea, where it inhabits two disjunct mountain ranges (the Fakfak and Kumawa Mountains) separated by 80 km of lowland rainforest habitat unsuitable for the species. In the Kumawa Mountains, it inhabits mid-montane cloud forest with a canopy height of 10–30 m (30–100 ft) and an abundance of terrestrial and epiphytic ferns, mosses, and lichens. It seems to prefer relatively open areas with sparser trees and more abundant tree ferns. It inhabits a rather narrow elevational range, having been observed from 900 to 1,440 m (3,000 to 4,700 ft) in the Kumawa Mountains and from 1,200 to 1,500 m (3,900 to 4,900 ft) in the Fakfak Mountains. The species is thought to be non-migratory.

== Ecology and conservation ==
Most aspects of the satin berrypecker's ecology are unknown. The species's diet is unknown, but it is known to join mixed-species foraging flocks and has been observed 2 to 9 m (7 to 30 ft) above the ground. Species that the satin berrypecker is known to flock with include several types of flycatchers and warblers, the hooded pitohui, the black-billed sicklebill, and the magnificent bird-of-paradise. An adult male collected in November had enlarged testes, indicating possible breeding activity.

The satin berrypecker is listed as being of least concern on the IUCN Red List. It is endemic to two of the four mountain ranges in the poorly-studied West Papuan highlands Endemic Bird Area. It has been described as uncommon to common in the Kumawa Mountains, while its abundance in the Fakfak Mountains is unknown due to the small number of observations. Its population is unknown and it has a very small range, but it inhabits some of the most inaccessible and minimally deforested areas in New Guinea and so the population is likely to be stable. In the future, climate change may threaten this species by affecting its montane habitat. Recommended conservation measures for the satin berrypecker include identifying whether it occurs in any other mountain ranges in West Papua, determining its population size, and identifying any possible threats to species.
