= Berrypecker =

Berrypecker may refer to:

- One of six species of berrypecker in the bird family Melanocharitidae
- One of two species of painted berrypecker in the bird family Paramythiidae

== See also ==
- Pecker (disambiguation)
