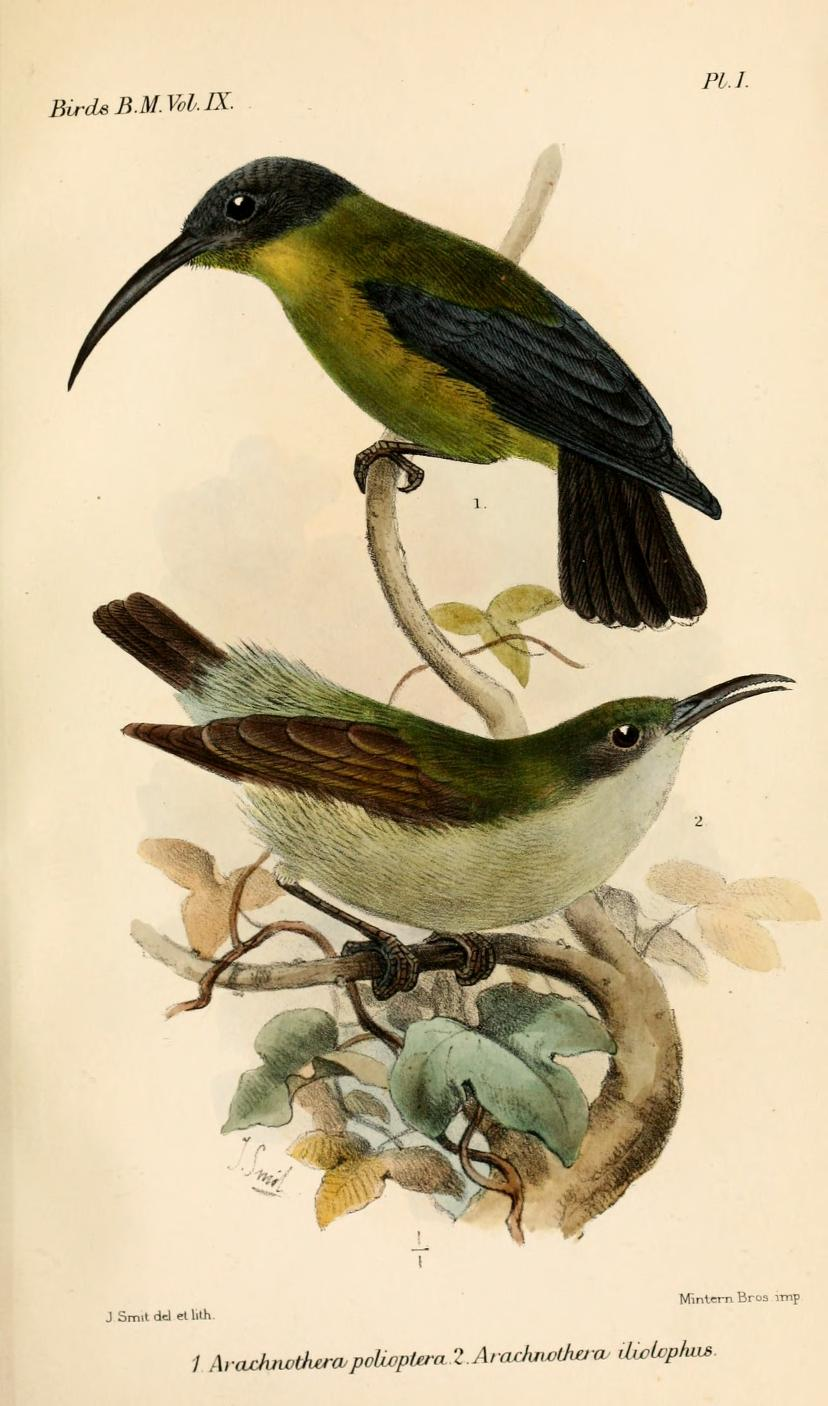
- Toxorhamphus poliopterus (above) Oedistoma iliolophus (below)

Scientific classification
- Kingdom: Animalia
- Phylum: Chordata
- Class: Aves
- Order: Passeriformes
- Family: Melanocharitidae
- Genus: Oedistoma; Salvadori, 1876

Type species
- Oedistoma pygmaeum Salvadori, 1876

= Oedistoma =

Genus of birds

Oedistoma is a genus of longbill in the bird family Melanocharitidae (berrypeckers and longbills). The genus, like the family, is endemic to New Guinea. The genus contains two species, both of which are sometimes placed in the genus Toxorhamphus.

== Species ==
Image	Common name	Scientific name
	Spectacled longbill	Oedistoma iliolophus
	Pygmy longbill	Oedistoma pygmaeum
