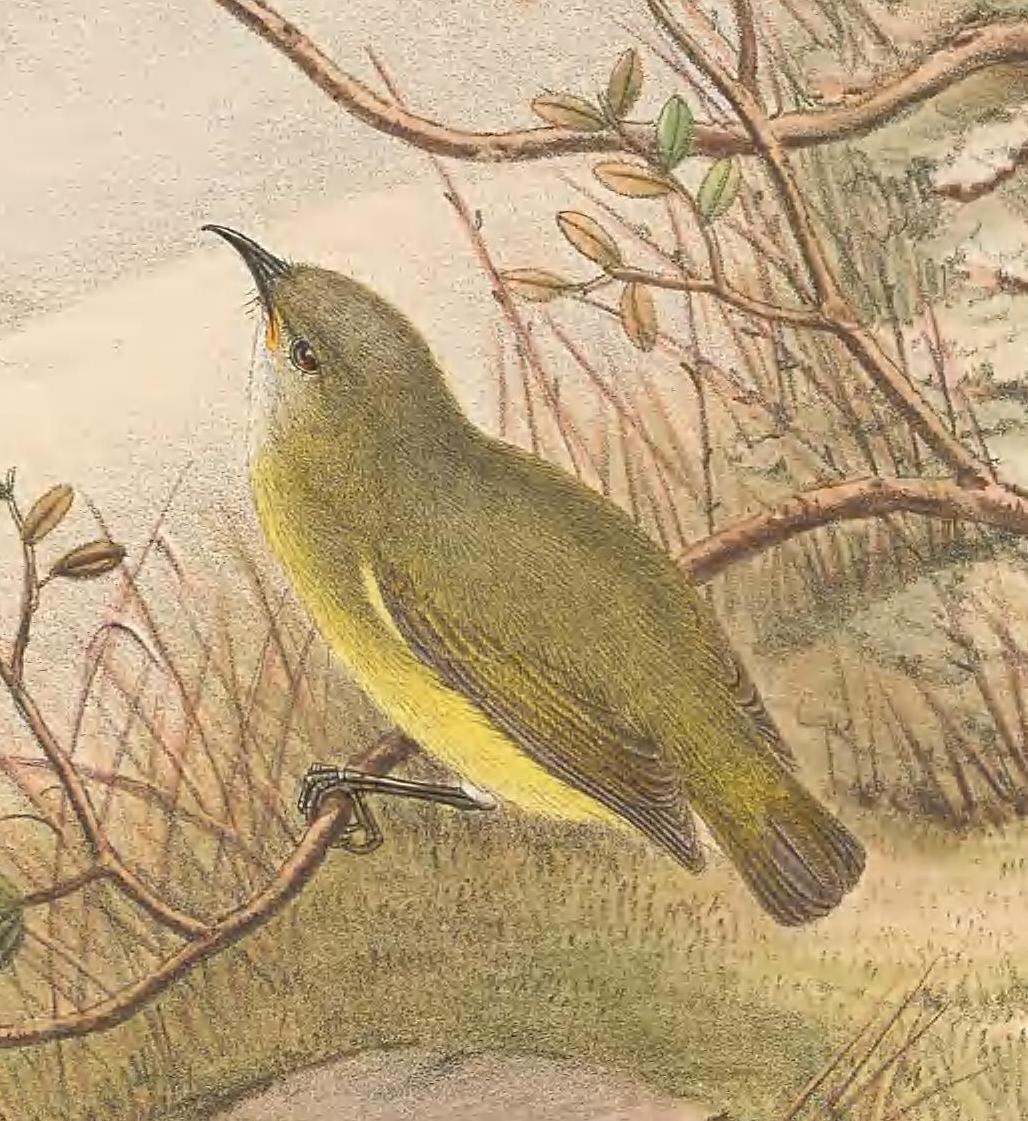
- Illustration by William Matthew Hart

Conservation status
- Least Concern (IUCN 3.1)

Scientific classification
- Kingdom: Animalia
- Phylum: Chordata
- Class: Aves
- Order: Passeriformes
- Family: Melanocharitidae
- Genus: Oedistoma
- Species: O. pygmaeum

Binomial name
- Oedistoma pygmaeum Salvadori, 1876

Synonyms
- Toxorhamphus pygmaeus Toxorhamphus pygmaeum

= Pygmy longbill =

Species of bird

The pygmy longbill or pygmy honeyeater (Oedistoma pygmaeum) is a species of bird in the family Melanocharitidae. It is one of the two species in the genus Oedistoma, which also includes the spectacled longbill. It is found in New Guinea and adjacent islands. Its natural habitats are subtropical or tropical dry forest and subtropical or tropical moist lowland forest.

Near Sorong
