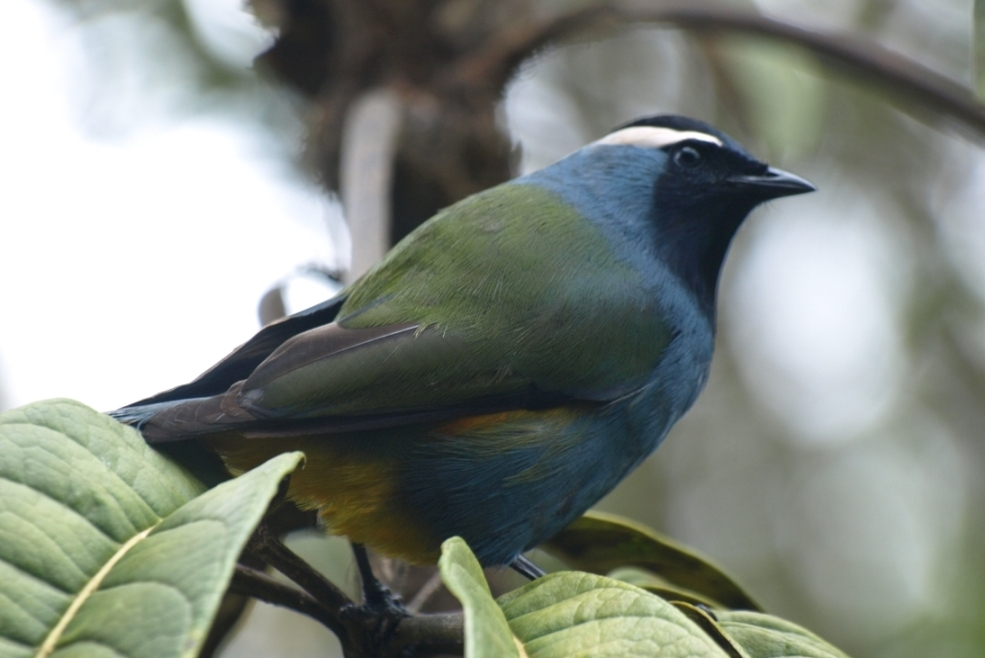
- Paramythia montium montium

Conservation status
- Least Concern (IUCN 3.1)

Scientific classification
- Kingdom: Animalia
- Phylum: Chordata
- Class: Aves
- Order: Passeriformes
- Family: Paramythiidae
- Genus: Paramythia
- Species: P. montium

Binomial name
- Paramythia montium De Vis, 1892

= Eastern crested berrypecker =

Species of bird

The eastern crested berrypecker (Paramythia montium) is a species of bird in the family Paramythiidae. It is commonly found in the high montane forests and shrublands of New Guinea. There are two subspecies, Paramythia montium montium and Paramythia montium brevicauda. The former inhabits the eastern portion of the New Guinea Highlands while the latter can be found in the Huon Peninsula. The western crested berrypecker (P. olivacea) was formerly considered conspecific but was split from it in 2021.

== Description ==
The species is 20–23 cm (7.9–9 in) and can be quickly identified by its characteristic black mask, pointed crest, and white eyebrow. Its plumage is largely blue and green with yellow undertail-coverts. The tail of the brevicauda subspecies is noticeably shorter than that of the montium subspecies.
