= Pecker =

Pecker may refer to:

== People ==
- Cory Pecker (born 1981), Canadian ice hockey player
- David Pecker (born 1951), American publisher
- Jean-Claude Pecker (1923–2020), French astronomer
- "Pecker", the nickname of the darts player Brian Woods
- Pecker, a character from the Jak and Daxter video game series

== Films and media ==
- Pecker, a 1998 movie directed by John Waters
  - Pecker's soundtrack, released as an album

== Slang terms ==
- An American slang term for a penis
- an electric motor's terminal connection box, in American slang
- a nose or courage, in British slang

== Other ==
- some birds, especially the woodpecker but sometimes flowerpecker, oxpecker or (rarely) berrypecker
- 1629 Pecker, an asteroid discovered in 1952 by astronomer Louis Boyer

== See also ==
- Pekka (name)
