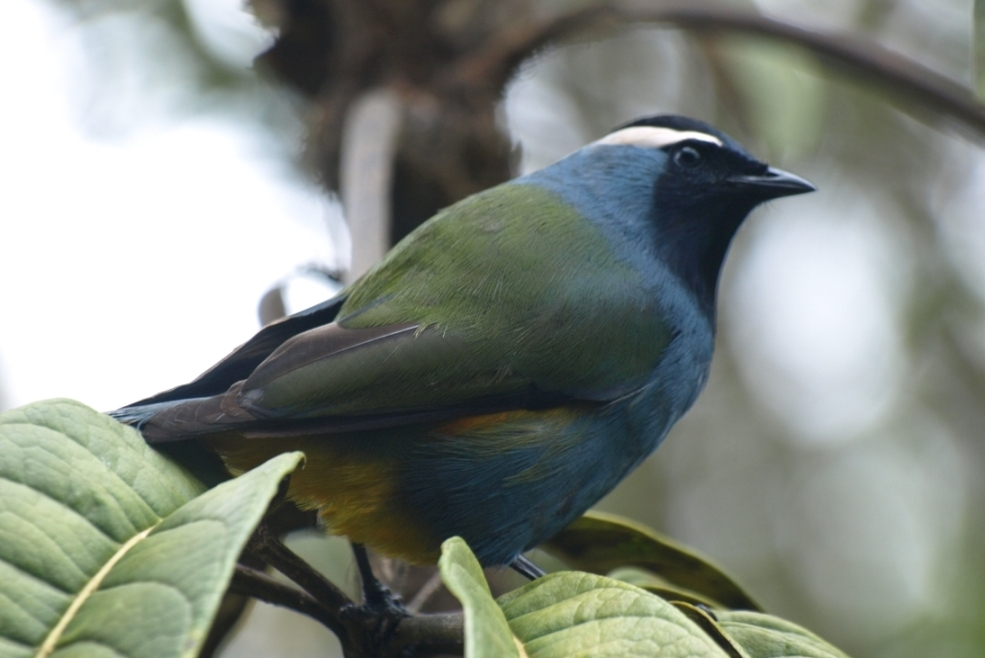
- Eastern crested berrypecker (P. montium)

Scientific classification
- Kingdom: Animalia
- Phylum: Chordata
- Class: Aves
- Order: Passeriformes
- Superfamily: Orioloidea
- Family: Paramythiidae; P.L. Sclater, 1893

Genera
- Oreocharis (Salvadori, 1876), Paramythia (De Vis, 1892)

= Painted berrypecker =

Painted berrypeckers

Family of birds

The painted berrypeckers, Paramythiidae, are a very small bird family restricted to the mountain forests of New Guinea. The family comprises three species in two genera: the tit berrypecker (Oreocharis arfaki) in Oreocharis, and the eastern crested berrypecker (Paramythia montium) and western crested berrypecker (Paramythia olivacea) in Paramythia. These are colourful medium-sized birds which feed on fruit and some insects. These species were formerly included in the Dicaeidae, but DNA–DNA hybridization studies showed these species were related to each other but distinct from the flowerpeckers. Some sources group painted berrypeckers as two genera belonging to the berrypecker family Melanocharitidae.

== Description ==
The painted berrypeckers are small to medium-sized passerine birds. The smallest species, the tit berrypecker, ranges from 12–14 cm in length and weighs around 17–21 g. The larger crested berrypeckers are 19–22 cm in length and weigh 36–61 g. The variation in size in the crested berrypecker is due to differences in altitude (Rapoport's rule), with birds being larger at higher altitudes. Both genera have short necks, moderately long and broad rounded wings, and plump bodies. The tails vary between the two genera, with the tit berrypecker having a short square one and that of the crested berrypeckers being longish. In both species the short bill is strong and black.

The plumage of both species is soft, downy and brightly coloured. In both species the backs and wings are green and the tail is blue-grey. In the tit berrypecker the plumage is sexually dimorphic, with the male having bright yellow patches on the face, wing and chest but the female being overall duller. Both sexes of the crested berrypeckers are similar, but the species exhibits instead some variation between two subspecies. The plumages of the juveniles resemble the female in the case of the tit berrypecker and dull adults in the case of the crested berrypeckers. The crested berrypeckers have, as suggested by the name, an erectile crest. Both genera have unique filoplumes (hairlike feathers) on the flanks that are not visible in the field and the function of which is unknown.

== Distribution and habitat ==
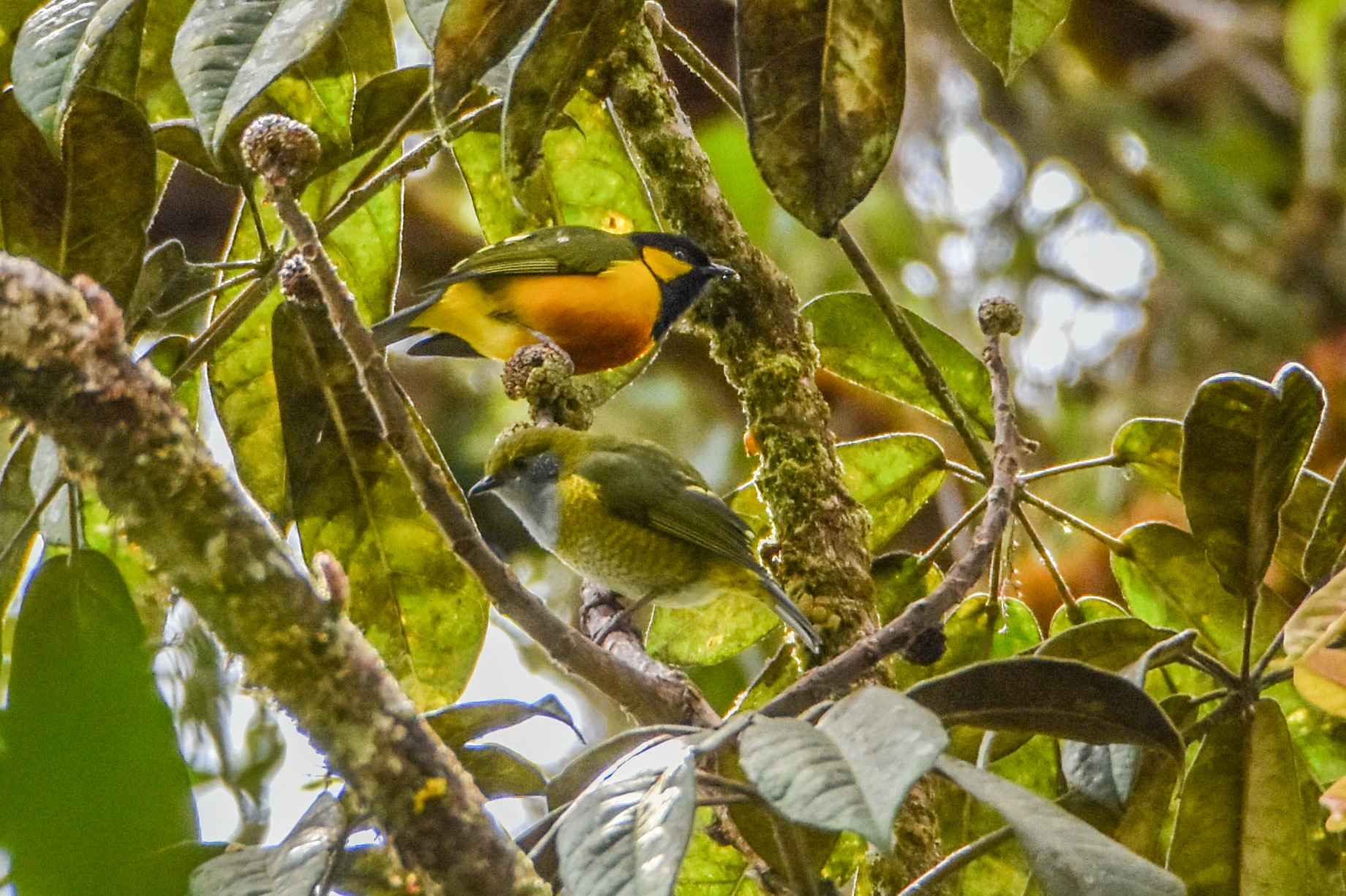
Tit berrypeckers

Both genera of painted berrypecker are endemic to the islands of New Guinea, one of two families to be restricted to the island (the other being the berrypeckers and longbills). Both genera are restricted to montane areas, usually above 2200m, though the tit berrypecker does occur as far down as 850m on occasions, and that species has a generally lower distribution than the crested berrypecker. Both genera are arboreal birds of montane forest, particularly mossy forest. At higher altitudes the crested berrypecker will also inhabit stunted alpine forest and alpine thickets. It is unknown if the three species make any migratory movements, although it has been suggested that the tit berrypecker may be partly nomadic.

== Behaviour ==
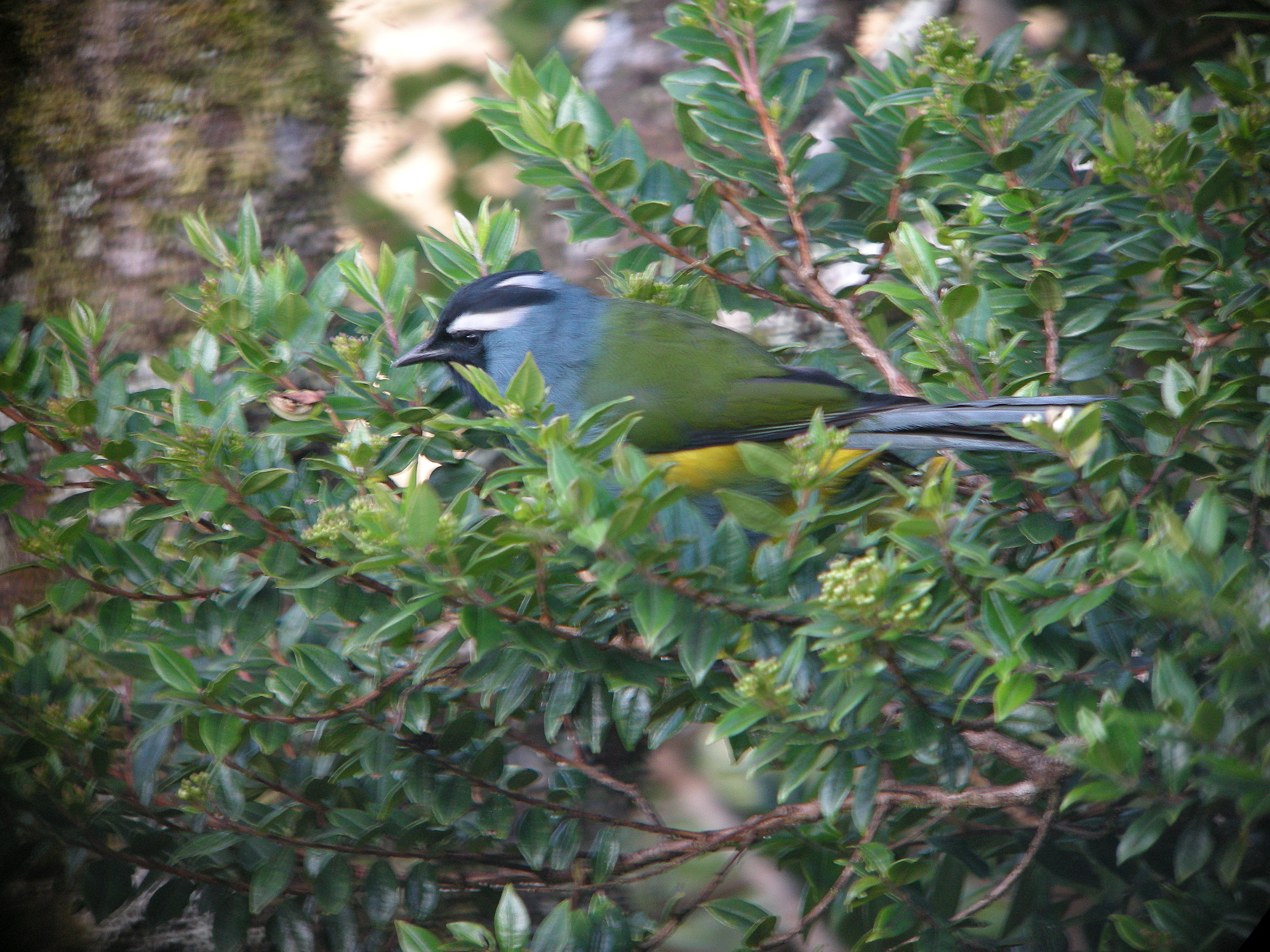
Crested berrypecker

The painted berrypeckers are common, active, and diurnal birds. They usually occur in pairs or in small groups, up to 30 tit berrypeckers or 10 crested berrypeckers. The crested berrypecker flocks are occasionally joined by mixed-species feeding flocks of insectivorous birds such as fantails, honeyeaters and the blue-capped ifrit, and tit berrypeckers often join other bird species such as honeyeaters and birds of paradise in feeding trees.

As far as is known, the painted berrypeckers are almost entirely frugivorous. Small fruits and berries comprise the biggest part of the diet, although the tit berrypecker has also been recorded eating small flowers. The crested berrypecker has also been observed to occasionally eat insects, and insects as well as fruit comprise the diet of nestlings.

The breeding behaviour of both genera of painted berrypeckers is poorly known. Both species are monogamous, and are thought to be seasonal, with the tit berrypecker apparently nesting in the tail end of the dry season and early wet season. The crested berrypecker breeds from August to February. The nests of both species are open cups built from moss. Beyond that nothing is known of the tit berrypecker. In the crested berrypeckers the female alone incubates the eggs, with the incubation period lasting for over 12 days. Upon hatching both parents feed the chick and remove the faecal sacs.

== Relationship with humans ==
The painted berrypeckers have limited interactions with humans. Like many New Guinean birds they are hunted opportunistically for food, but in spite of their bright plumage they are not targeted for their feathers in the same fashion as birds of paradise. If they have any cultural importance to the tribes of New Guinea at present this has not been documented. They are, however, sought out by birdwatchers, particularly the crested berrypecker, and as such have a small role in ecotourism.

None of the species is considered to be threatened on the IUCN Red List. They are common within their ranges and while some of their montane habitat has been cleared for agriculture large areas remain intact.
