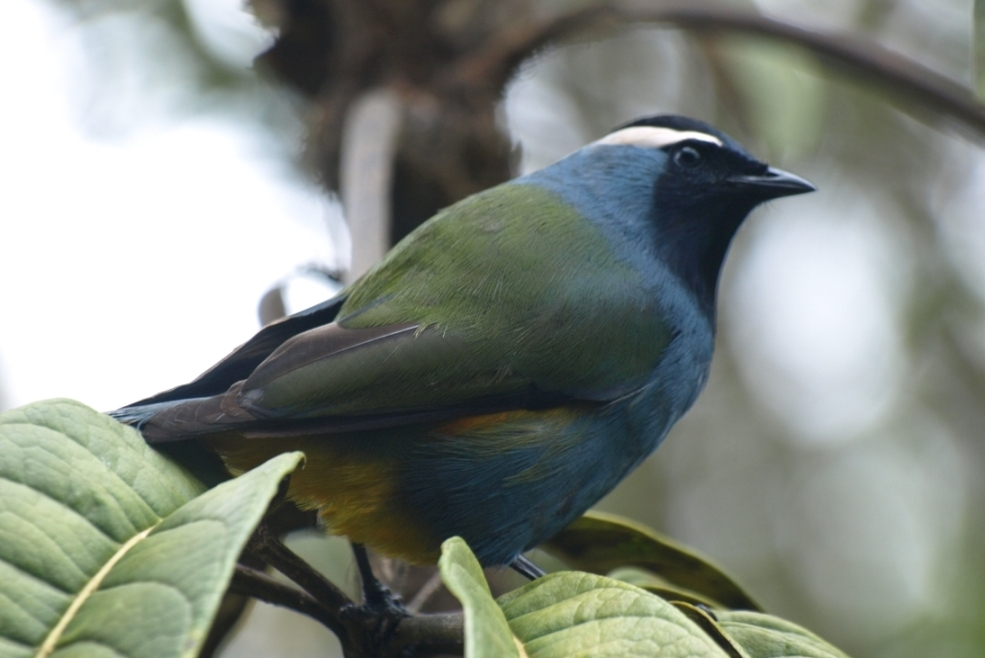
- Eastern crested berrypecker

Scientific classification
- Kingdom: Animalia
- Phylum: Chordata
- Class: Aves
- Order: Passeriformes
- Family: Paramythiidae
- Genus: Paramythia; De Vis, 1892

= Paramythia (bird) =

Genus of birds

Paramythia is a genus of berrypecker in the family Paramythiidae.

== Species ==
It contains the following species:

Image	Common name	Scientific name	Distribution
	Eastern crested berrypecker	Paramythia montium	New Guinea
	Western crested berrypecker	Paramythia olivacea	New Guinea.
