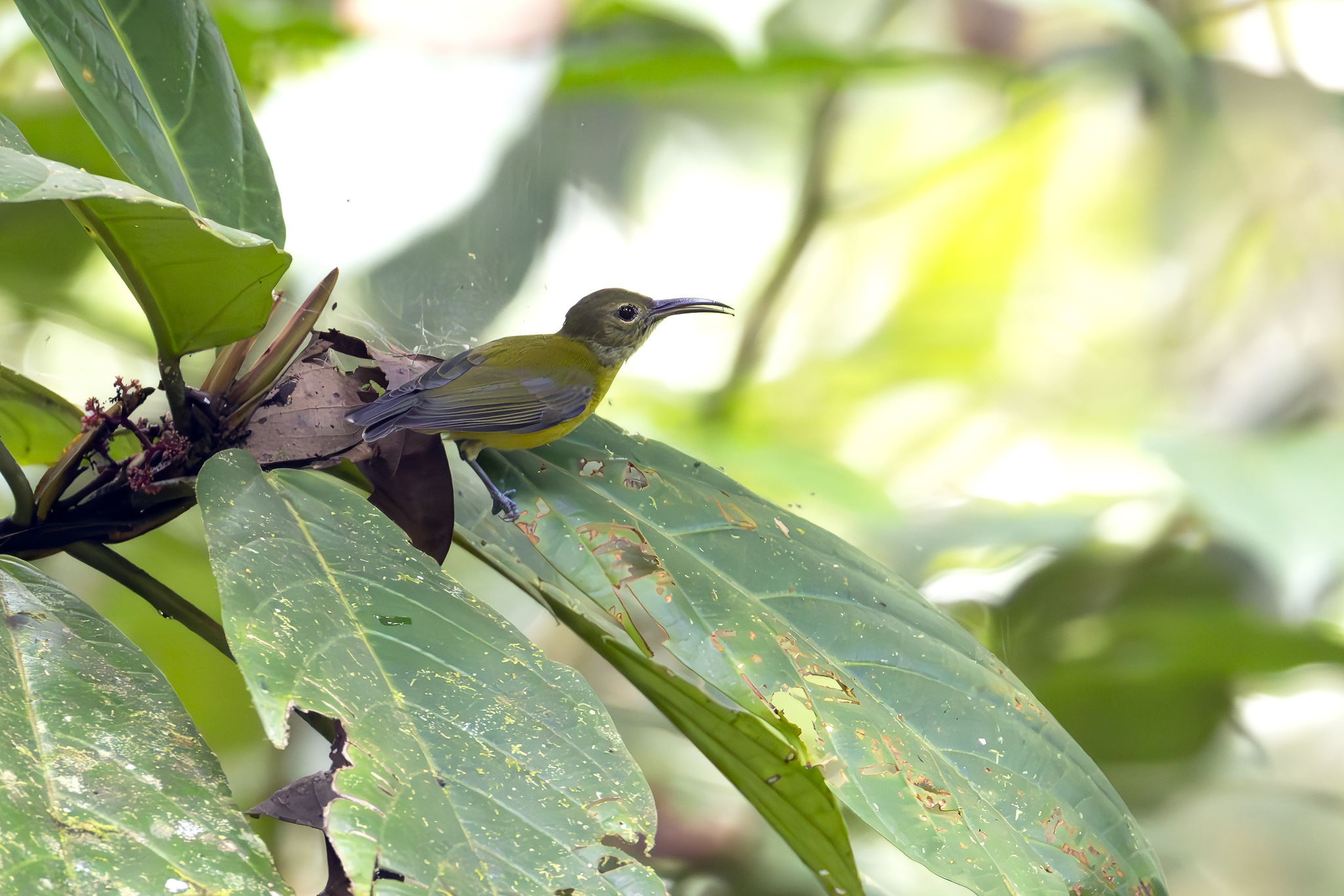

Conservation status
- Least Concern (IUCN 3.1)

Scientific classification
- Kingdom: Animalia
- Phylum: Chordata
- Class: Aves
- Order: Passeriformes
- Family: Melanocharitidae
- Genus: Toxorhamphus
- Species: T. novaeguineae

Binomial name
- Toxorhamphus novaeguineae (Lesson, 1827)

= Yellow-bellied longbill =

Species of bird

The yellow-bellied longbill or green-crowned longbill (Toxorhamphus novaeguineae) is a species of bird in the family Melanocharitidae. It is found in New Guinea. Its natural habitats are subtropical or tropical moist lowland forest and subtropical or tropical moist montane forest.
