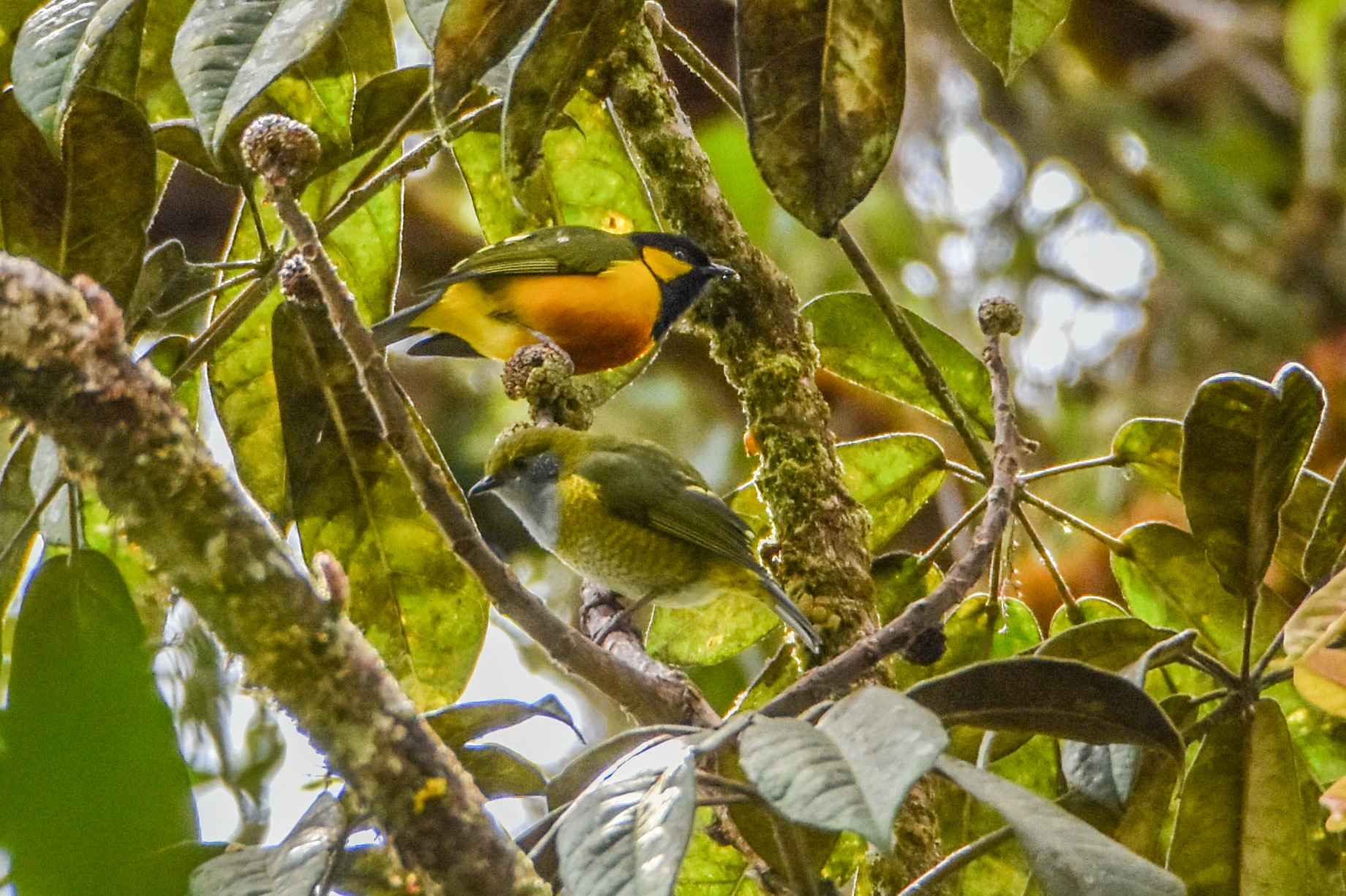
- Male (above) and female (below)

Conservation status
- Least Concern (IUCN 3.1)

Scientific classification
- Kingdom: Animalia
- Phylum: Chordata
- Class: Aves
- Order: Passeriformes
- Family: Paramythiidae
- Genus: Oreocharis; Salvadori, 1876
- Species: O. arfaki

Binomial name
- Oreocharis arfaki (A.B. Meyer, 1875)

= Tit berrypecker =

Species of bird

The tit berrypecker (Oreocharis arfaki) is a species of bird in the family Paramythiidae. First described by Christian Erich Hermann von Meyer in 1875, it is monotypic within the genus Oreocharis. It is found in the New Guinea Highlands and more scarcely in northern parts of the island, in subtropical or tropical moist montane forests.
