= Obscure berrypecker =

- In Papua Barat, Indonesia

Conservation status
- Least Concern (IUCN 3.1)

Scientific classification
- Kingdom: Animalia
- Phylum: Chordata
- Class: Aves
- Order: Passeriformes
- Family: Melanocharitidae
- Genus: Melanocharis
- Species: M. arfakiana

Binomial name
- Melanocharis arfakiana (Finsch, 1900)

Synonyms
- Dicaeum arfakianum (protonym)

Species of bird

The obscure berrypecker (Melanocharis arfakiana) is a small passerine bird from the berrypecker family Melanocharitidae. It was described by the German ornithologist Friedrich Finsch based on a specimen collected on the island of New Guinea (to which the berrypecker family is endemic); collected in 1867 in the Arfak Mountains (now in Papua). Another specimen was collected in 1933 in the mountains (950–1000 m) northwest of Port Moresby in Papua New Guinea (BirdLife International 2006), these two specimens are the only confirmed records of the species. Unconfirmed sight records have been made in regions of New Guinea; these suggest that the species is not rare, and is a resident of disturbed forest, able to cope with human modification of its habitat. All these sightings were all made in the mountains (640-1,100 m), which is consistent with the range of the rest of the berrypeckers, only the black berrypecker has a lowland range (Beeher et al. 1986).

== Description ==
The obscure berrypecker is a drab olive coloured bird with a greyish wash on its upperparts. It resembles the female black berrypecker except that its wing linings and pectoral tufts are yellowish and the bill is pale coloured. The species is arboreal (Gregory & Webster 2004) and probably is a solitary forager of fruit and small invertebrates obtained by hover-gleaning (like the rest of the berrypeckers).
