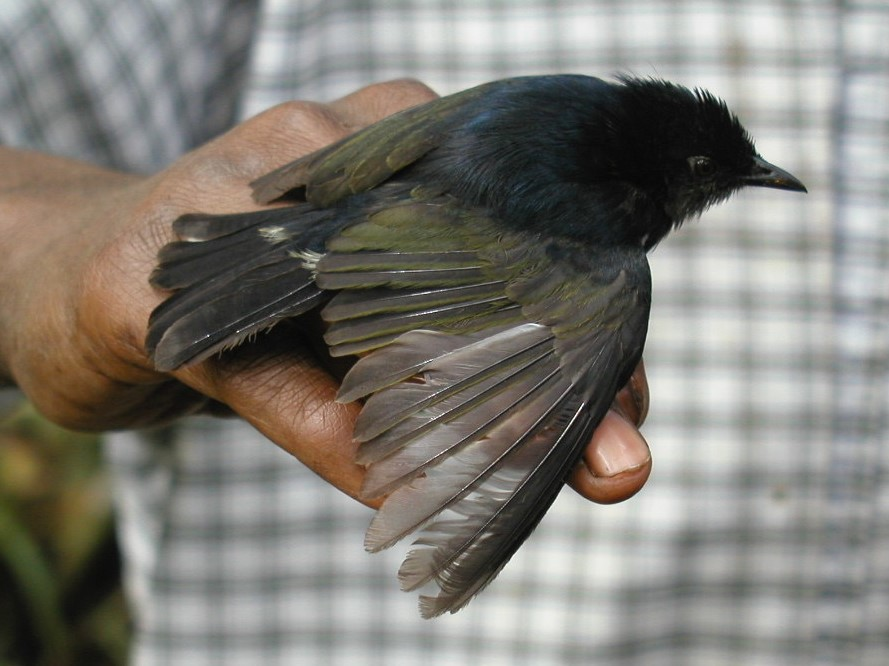
- Black berrypecker (Melanocharis nigra)

Scientific classification
- Kingdom: Animalia
- Phylum: Chordata
- Class: Aves
- Order: Passeriformes
- Family: Melanocharitidae
- Genus: Melanocharis; P.L. Sclater, 1858

Type species
- Dicaeum niger Lesson, 1830

Synonyms
- Rhamphocharis Salvadori, 1876

= Melanocharis =

Genus of birds

Melanocharis is a genus of birds in the berrypecker and longbill family Melanocharitidae that are endemic to New Guinea.

== Taxonomy ==
The genus Melanocharis was introduced in 1858 by the English zoologist Philip Sclater to accommodate a single species, Dicaeum niger Lesson, the black berrypecker. This is the type species. The genus name combines the Ancient Greek μελας/melas, μελανος/melanos meaning "black" with χαρις/kharis, χαριτος/kharitos meaning "beauty".

A molecular genetic study published in 2021 found that the spotted berrypecker, then placed in the genus Rhamphocharis, was embedded in Melanocharis. Based on this result, the genus Rhamphocharis was subsumed into Melanocharis.

== Species ==
The genus contains the following eight species:

Image	Common name	Scientific name
	Obscure berrypecker	Melanocharis arfakiana
	Black berrypecker	Melanocharis nigra
	Mid-mountain berrypecker	Melanocharis longicauda
	Fan-tailed berrypecker	Melanocharis versteri
	Satin berrypecker	Melanocharis citreola
	Streaked berrypecker	Melanocharis striativentris
	Thick-billed berrypecker	Melanocharis crassirostris
	Spotted berrypecker	Melanocharis piperata
