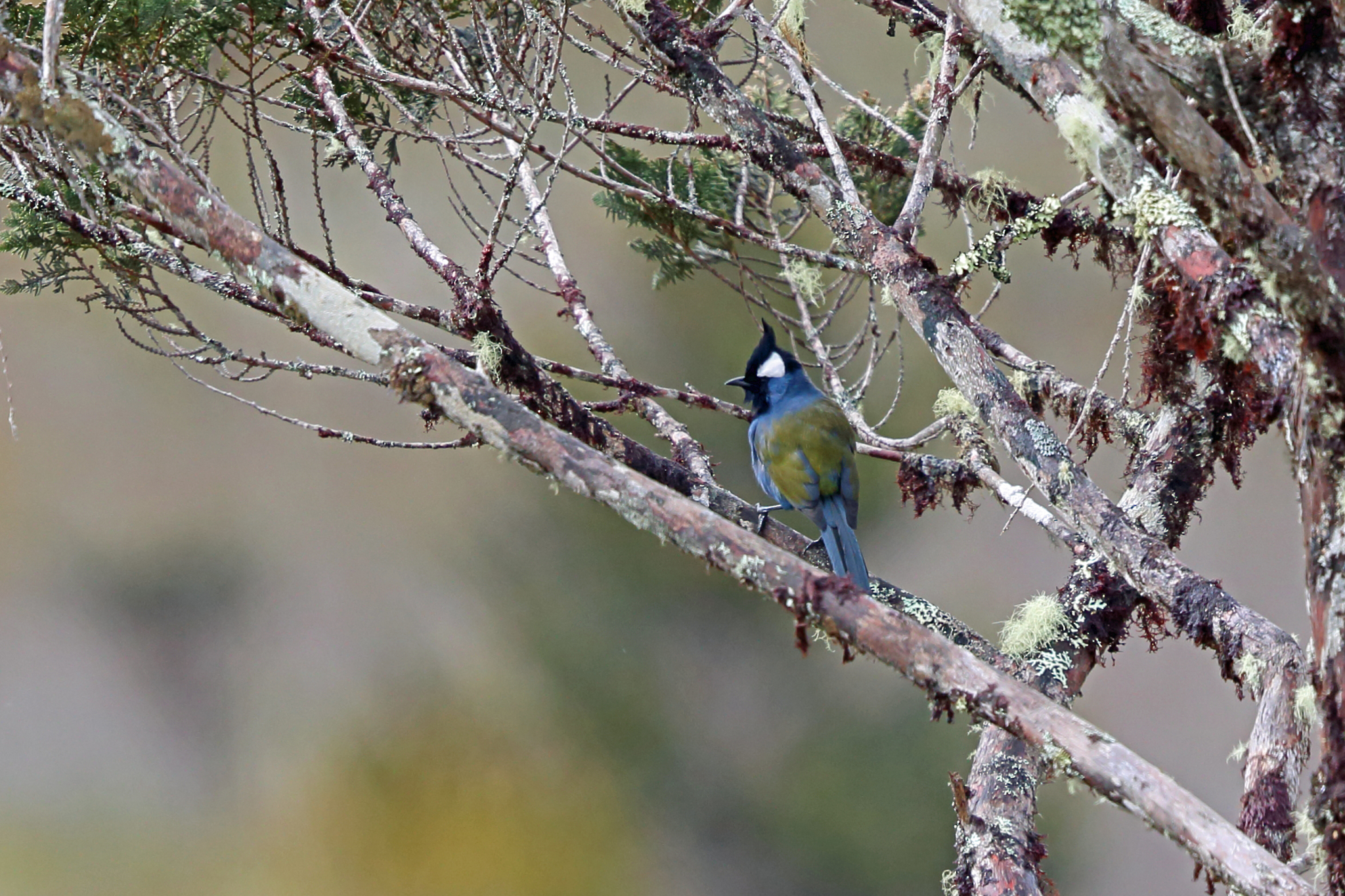

Conservation status
- Least Concern (IUCN 3.1)

Scientific classification
- Kingdom: Animalia
- Phylum: Chordata
- Class: Aves
- Order: Passeriformes
- Family: Paramythiidae
- Genus: Paramythia
- Species: P. olivacea

Binomial name
- Paramythia olivacea Van Oort, 1910

= Western crested berrypecker =

Species of bird

The western crested berrypecker (Paramythia olivacea) is a species of bird in the family Paramythiidae. It is commonly found in the high montane forests and shrublands of New Guinea.
