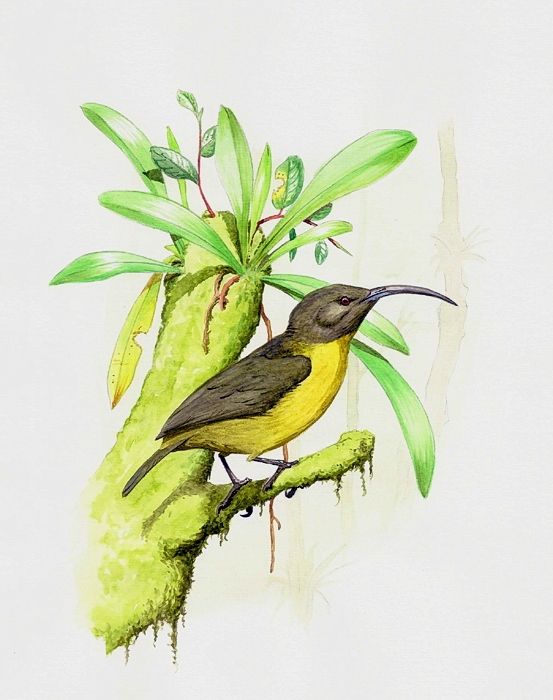

Scientific classification
- Kingdom: Animalia
- Phylum: Chordata
- Class: Aves
- Order: Passeriformes
- Family: Melanocharitidae
- Genus: Toxorhamphus; Stresemann, 1914

Type species
- Cinnyris novaeguineae Lesson, 1827

= Toxorhamphus =

Genus of birds

Toxorhamphus is a genus of birds in the family Melanocharitidae. They are commonly known as longbills and were once thought to be in the honeyeater family. The genus is endemic to the islands of New Guinea.

== Species ==
It contains the following species:

| Image | Common name | Scientific name |
|---|---|---|
| | Yellow-bellied longbill | Toxorhamphus novaeguineae |
| | Slaty-headed longbill | Toxorhamphus poliopterus |
