= Streaked berrypecker =

- In Western Highlands, Papua New Guinea

Conservation status
- Least Concern (IUCN 3.1)

Scientific classification
- Kingdom: Animalia
- Phylum: Chordata
- Class: Aves
- Order: Passeriformes
- Family: Melanocharitidae
- Genus: Melanocharis
- Species: M. striativentris

Binomial name
- Melanocharis striativentris Salvadori, 1895

Species of bird

The streaked berrypecker (Melanocharis striativentris) is a species of bird in the family Melanocharitidae. It is found in the New Guinea Highlands. Its natural habitats are subtropical or tropical moist lowland forest and subtropical or tropical moist montane forest.
