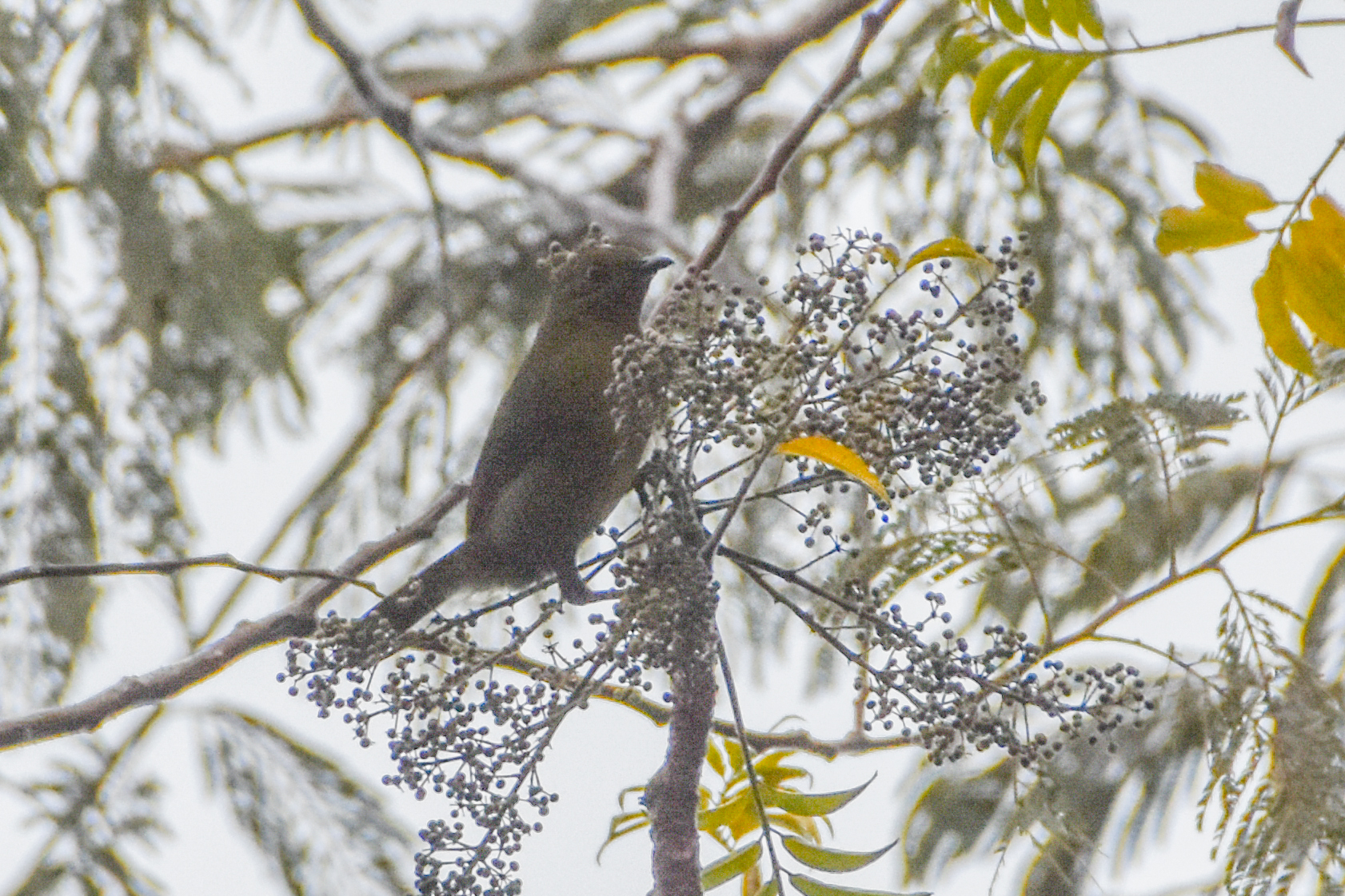

Conservation status
- Least Concern (IUCN 3.1)

Scientific classification
- Kingdom: Animalia
- Phylum: Chordata
- Class: Aves
- Order: Passeriformes
- Family: Melanocharitidae
- Genus: Melanocharis
- Species: M. longicauda

Binomial name
- Melanocharis longicauda Salvadori, 1876

= Mid-mountain berrypecker =

Species of bird

The mid-mountain berrypecker or lemon-breasted berrypecker (Melanocharis longicauda) is a species of bird in the family Melanocharitidae. It is found in the New Guinea Highlands. Its natural habitats are subtropical or tropical moist lowland forest and subtropical or tropical moist montane forest.
