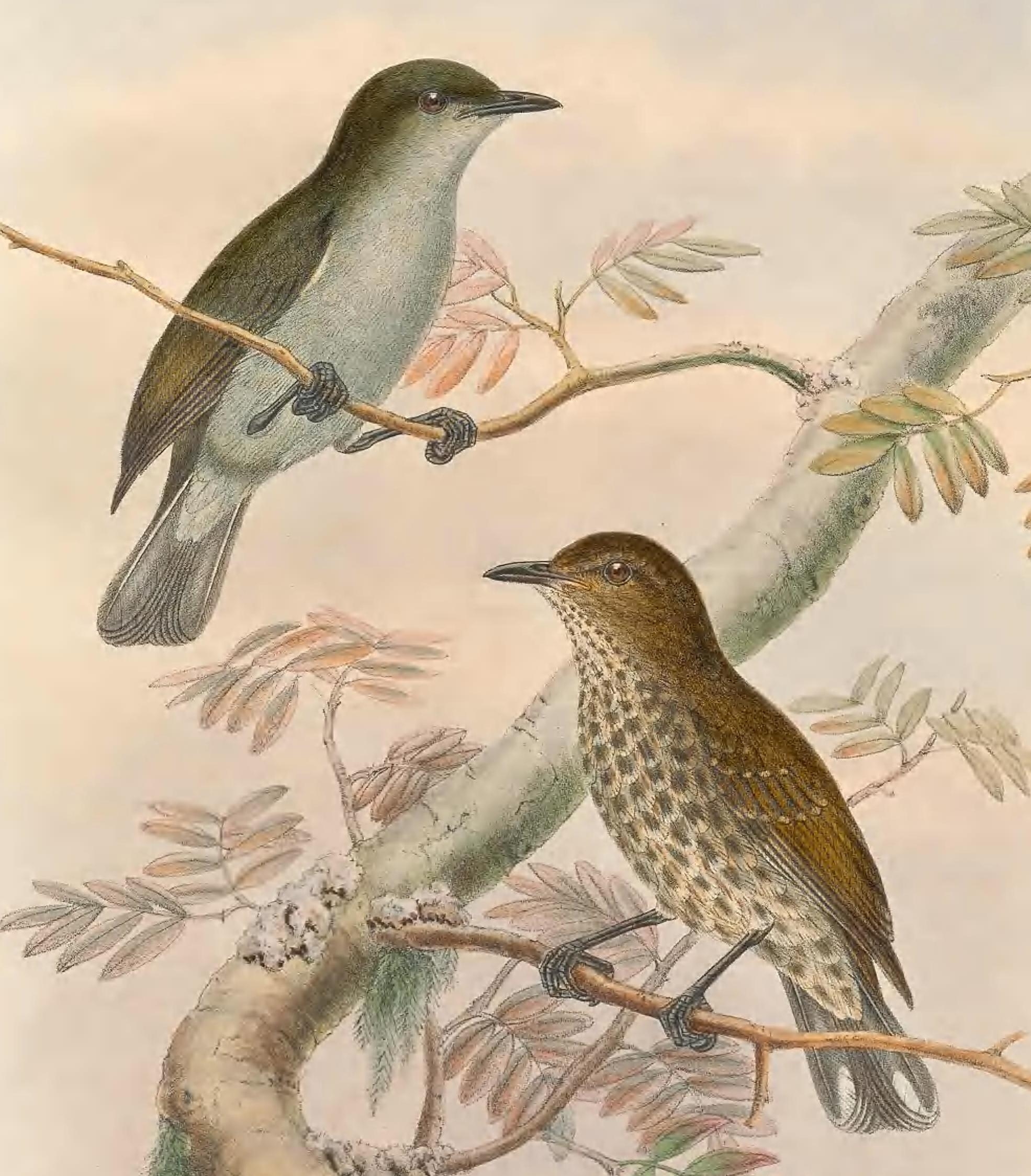
- Male (upper left) and female (bottom) by W. Hart
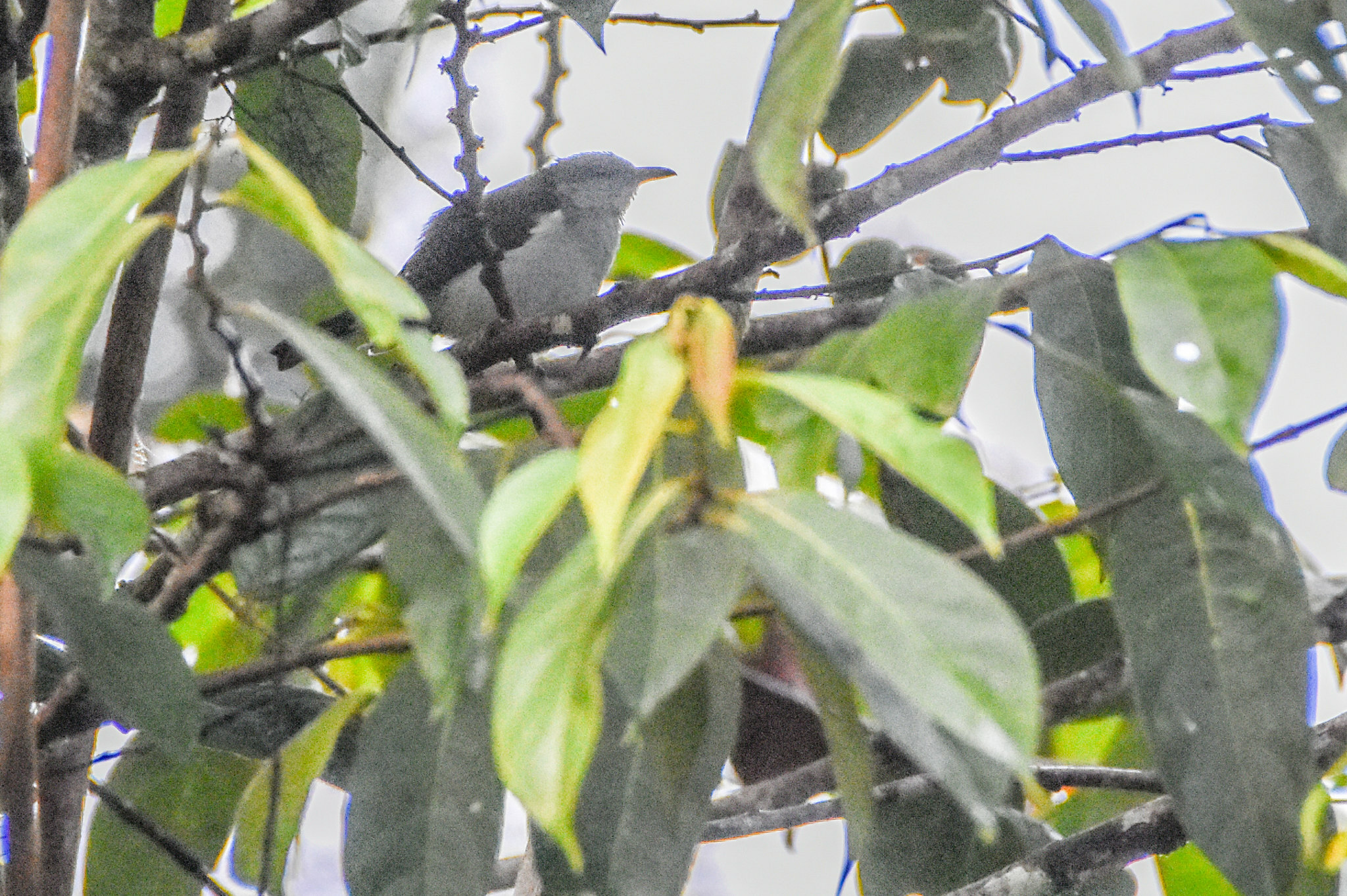

Conservation status
- Least Concern (IUCN 3.1)

Scientific classification
- Kingdom: Animalia
- Phylum: Chordata
- Class: Aves
- Order: Passeriformes
- Family: Melanocharitidae
- Genus: Melanocharis
- Species: M. piperata

Binomial name
- Melanocharis piperata (De Vis, 1898)

Synonyms
- Rhamphocharis piperata

= Spotted berrypecker =

Species of bird

The spotted berrypecker (Melanocharis piperata) is a species of bird in the family Melanocharitidae. It is found in New Guinea. It was formerly considered a subspecies of the thick-billed berrypecker (Rhamphocharis crassirostris), but was split as a distinct species by the IOC in 2021. The name "spotted berrypecker" references the spotted plumage that the female bird has.

Its natural habitat is subtropical or tropical moist montane forests.

A molecular genetic study published in 2021 found that the spotted berrypecker, then placed in the genus Rhamphocharis, was embedded in the genus Melanocharis. Base on this result, the spotted berrypecker and the thick-billed berrypecker were moved from Rhamphocharis to Melanocharis.
