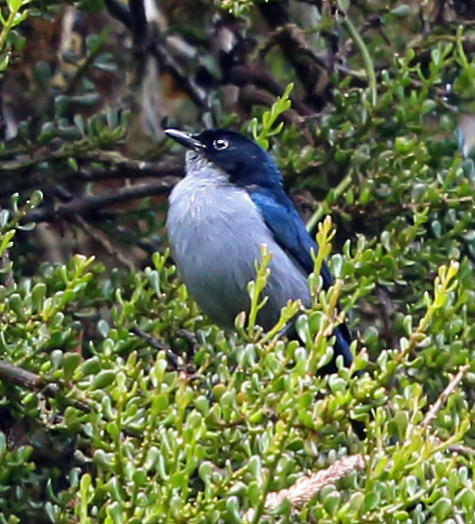

Conservation status
- Least Concern (IUCN 3.1)

Scientific classification
- Kingdom: Animalia
- Phylum: Chordata
- Class: Aves
- Order: Passeriformes
- Family: Melanocharitidae
- Genus: Melanocharis
- Species: M. versteri

Binomial name
- Melanocharis versteri (Finsch, 1876)

= Fan-tailed berrypecker =

Species of bird

The fan-tailed berrypecker (Melanocharis versteri) is a species of bird in the family Melanocharitidae. It is found in New Guinea. Its natural habitat is subtropical or tropical moist montane forest.

The female is darker-colored and bigger than the male, an unusual feature for a passerine (Kikkawa 2003).
