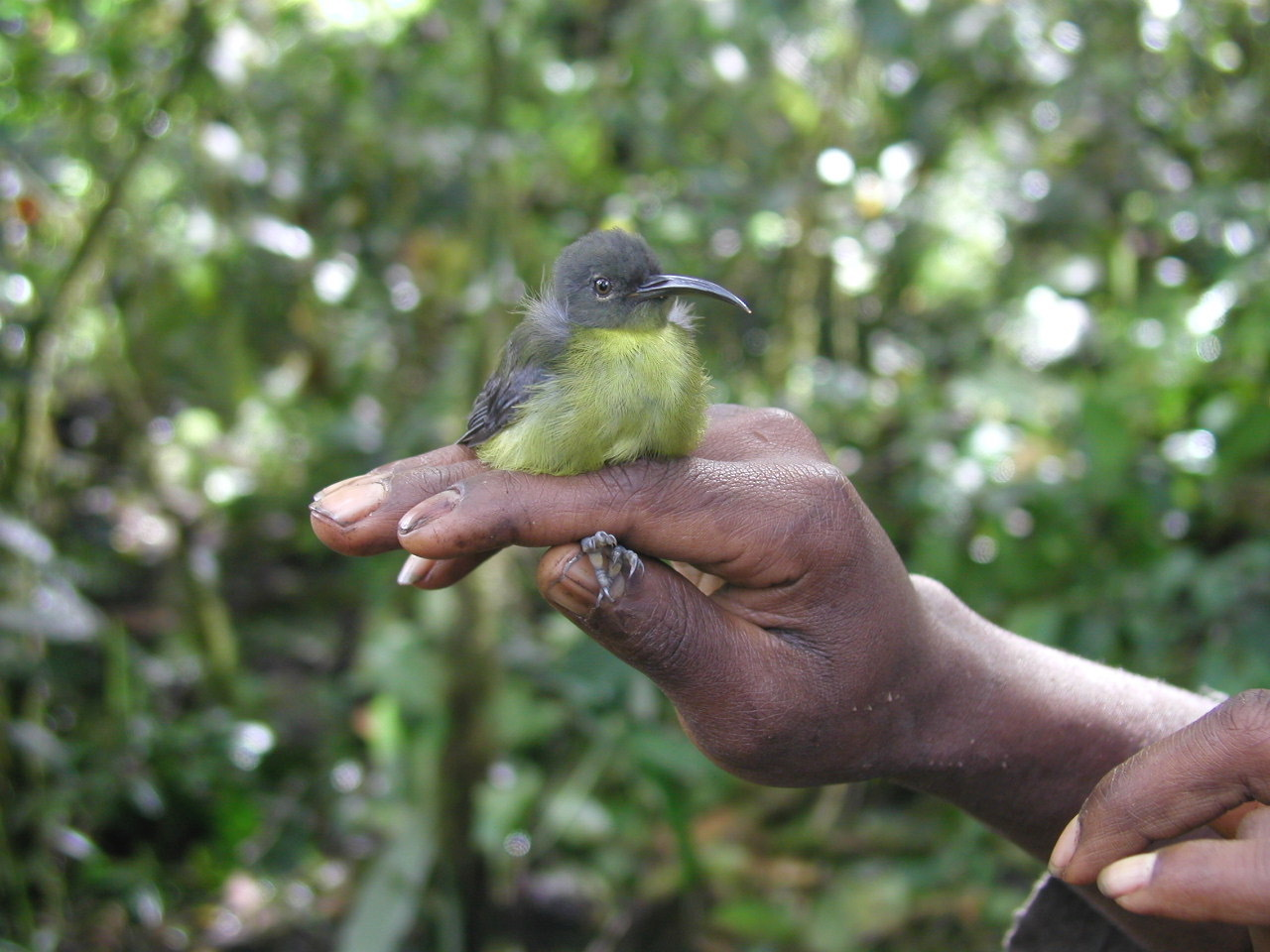

Conservation status
- Least Concern (IUCN 3.1)

Scientific classification
- Kingdom: Animalia
- Phylum: Chordata
- Class: Aves
- Order: Passeriformes
- Family: Melanocharitidae
- Genus: Toxorhamphus
- Species: T. poliopterus

Binomial name
- Toxorhamphus poliopterus (Sharpe, 1882)

= Slaty-headed longbill =

Species of bird

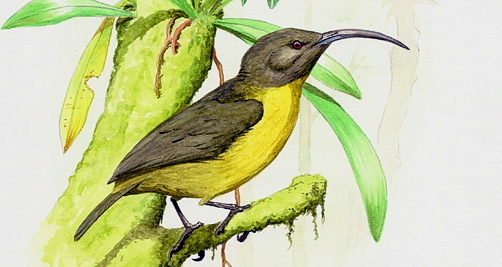
illustration

The slaty-headed longbill or grey-winged longbill (Toxorhamphus poliopterus) is a species of bird in the family Melanocharitidae. It is found in the New Guinea Highlands. Its natural habitats are subtropical or tropical moist lowland forest and subtropical or tropical moist montane forest.
