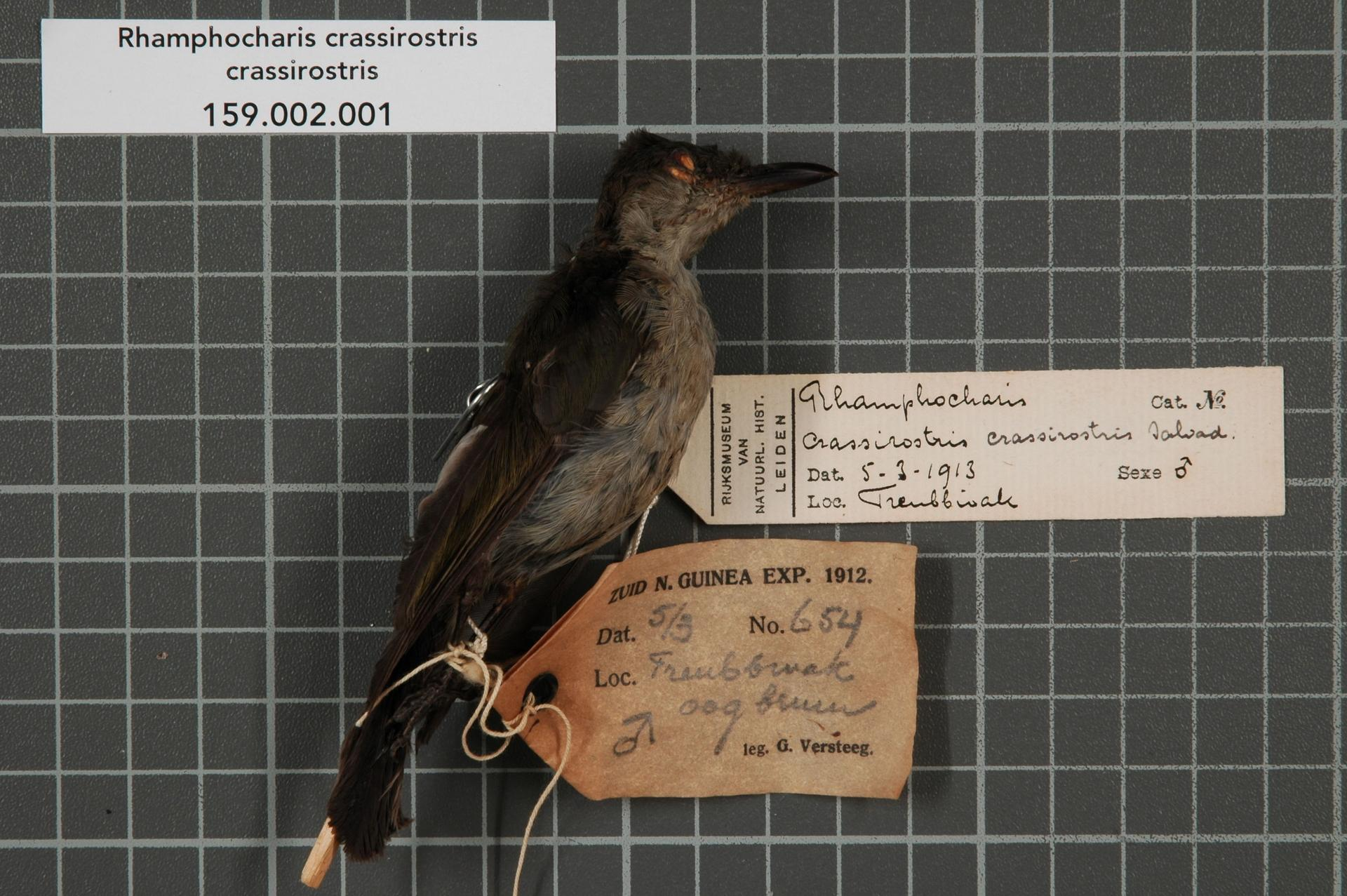
- Preserved specimen at Naturalis Biodiversity Center
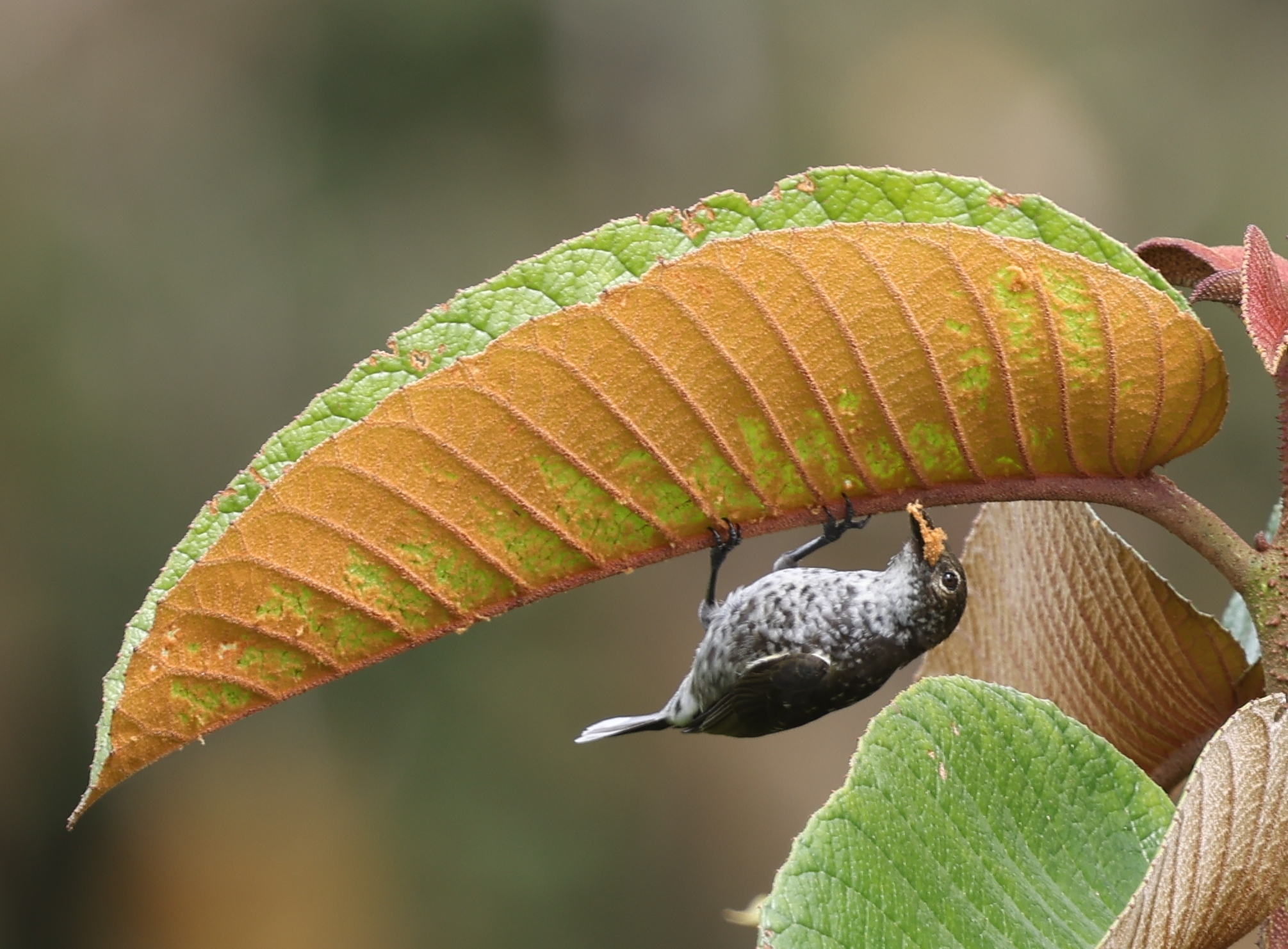

Conservation status
- Least Concern (IUCN 3.1)

Scientific classification
- Kingdom: Animalia
- Phylum: Chordata
- Class: Aves
- Order: Passeriformes
- Family: Melanocharitidae
- Genus: Melanocharis
- Species: M. crassirostris

Binomial name
- Melanocharis crassirostris (Salvadori, 1876)

Synonyms
- Rhamphocharis crassirostris

= Thick-billed berrypecker =

Species of bird

The thick-billed berrypecker (Melanocharis crassirostris) is a species of bird in the berrypecker and longbill family Melanocharitidae. It is found in New Guinea. Its natural habitat is subtropical or tropical moist montane forest. The spotted berrypecker (Rhamphocharis piperata) was formerly considered conspecific (with both species being grouped under the common name "spotted berrypecker" but with the scientific name R. crassirostris), but it was split as a distinct species by the IOC in 2021.
