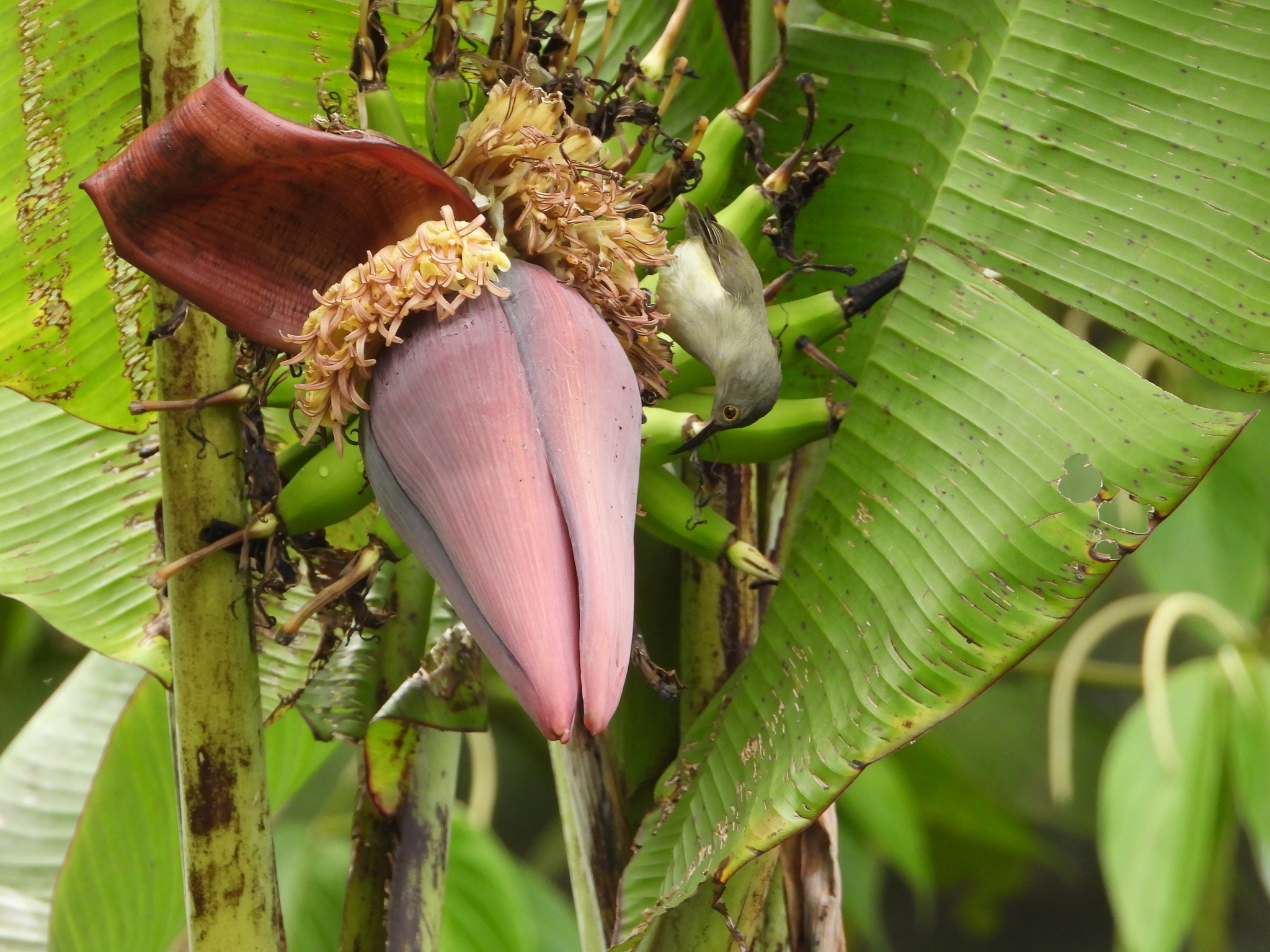

Conservation status
- Least Concern (IUCN 3.1)

Scientific classification
- Kingdom: Animalia
- Phylum: Chordata
- Class: Aves
- Order: Passeriformes
- Family: Melanocharitidae
- Genus: Oedistoma
- Species: O. iliolophus

Binomial name
- Oedistoma iliolophus (Salvadori, 1876)

Synonyms
- Toxorhamphus iliolophum

= Spectacled longbill =

Species of bird

The spectacled longbill (Oedistoma iliolophus), also known as dwarf longbill, plumed longbill or dwarf honeyeater, is a species of bird in the family Melanocharitidae. It is found in New Guinea. Its natural habitats are subtropical or tropical dry forest, subtropical or tropical moist lowland forest, and subtropical or tropical moist montane forest.
