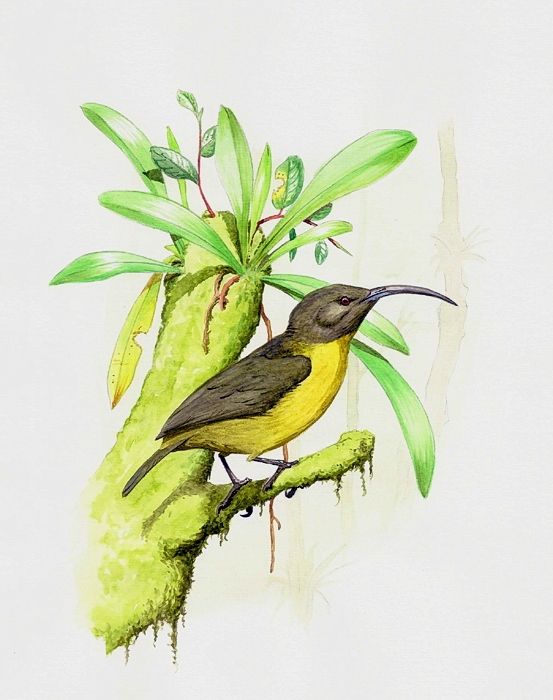
- Slaty-headed longbill (Toxorhamphus poliopterus)

Scientific classification
- Kingdom: Animalia
- Phylum: Chordata
- Class: Aves
- Order: Passeriformes
- Infraorder: Passerides
- Family: Melanocharitidae; Sibley & Ahlquist, 1985

Genera
- Melanocharis; Oedistoma; Toxorhamphus

= Melanocharitidae =

Berrypeckers and longbills

Family of birds

The Melanocharitidae, the berrypeckers and longbills, is a small bird family restricted to the forests of New Guinea. The family contains twelve species in three genera. They are small songbirds with generally dull plumage but a range of body shapes.

== Taxonomy and systematics ==
The identification of the family Melanocharitidae was not known or suspected until the work of Sibley and Ahlquist on the taxonomy of birds using DNA–DNA hybridization The genera had been instead placed with other families. The two genera of berrypecker had been placed inside the flowerpecker family Dicaeidae, and the longbills were once considered to be honeyeaters (which they closely resemble). Sibley and Ahlquist placed the berrypeckers and longbill family close to the painted berrypeckers (Paramythiidae), sunbirds and flowerpeckers, but a 2002 study found them closer to the satinbirds (Cnemophilidae, a recent split from the birds-of-paradise).

It comprises twelve species in three genera: the berrypeckers in Melanocharis, and the longbills in the two genera Toxorhamphus and Oedistoma. The two longbill genera are sometimes incorrectly lumped into the same genus, Toxorhamphus, in spite of Oedistoma being erected forty years prior to Toxorhamphus, which is a violation of the taxonomic principal of priority. There are both molecular and morphological reasons to keep the two genera separate, however. A 1993 study of the longbills, berrypeckers and some other aberrant honeyeaters found that the spectacled longbill was more closely related to the berrypeckers than the two longbills in the genus Toxorhamphus. There are also some morphological differences in the shape of the tarsus. The two species in Oedistoma, however, may not be closely related and more research is needed. The spotted berrypecker was previously in its own genus Rhamphocharis, while some treatments placed it in the Melanocharis berrypeckers. However, a molecular genetic study published in 2021 found the spotted berrypecker to be embedded in Melanocharis. Also in 2021, the thick-billed berrypecker, formerly considered conspecific with the spotted berrypecker (both the spotted berrypecker and the thick-billed berrypecker were grouped under the common name "spotted berrypecker", but with the scientific names Rhamphocaris piperata and Rhamphocharis crassirostris, respectively) was split as a distinct species by the International Ornithologists' Union. Following this, the genus Rhamphocharis was fully subsumed into Melanocharis.

There is some confusion with the common name of "berrypeckers", as there are three other berrypecker species in the small family Paramythiidae, once considered to be close to the flowerpeckers as well. Additionally, members of several African genera—notably species in the Old World warbler genus Macrosphenus—are also known as longbills, but are not related to the longbills of Melanocharitidae.

== Description ==
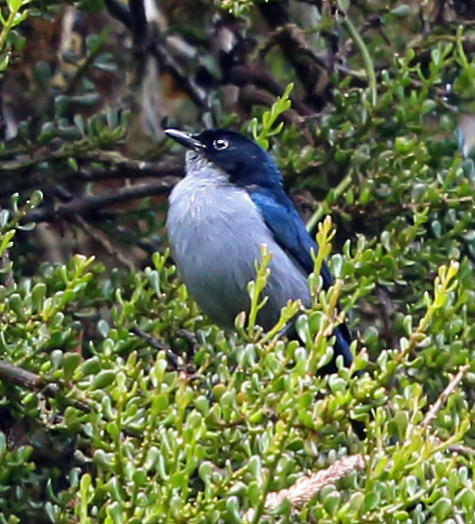
The fan-tailed berrypecker is the largest member of the family

The berrypeckers and longbills are small to very small songbirds. They range in length from 15 cm (5.9 in) in the case of the fan-tailed berrypecker to 7.3 cm (2.9 in) in the case of the pygmy longbill, which is the smallest bird in New Guinea. The berrypeckers (Melanocharis) are usually bigger than the Toxorhamphus and Oedistoma longbills. The females of two species, the fan-tailed and streaked berrypecker, are unique amongst songbirds in that they exhibit a reversal in the usual pattern of sexual dimorphism, with the females being both longer and heavier. For example, in the fan-tailed berrypecker the male weighs 12 to 15 g (0.42–0.53 oz), whereas the female weighs 16 to 20 g (0.56–0.71 oz).

They have drab-coloured plumage in greys, browns or black and white. The berrypeckers exhibit some sexual dimorphism in their plumage. The berrypeckers resemble stout short-billed honeyeaters, and the longbills are like drab sunbirds or short-tailed honeyeaters. The calls of the berrypeckers have been described as high pitched and faint, and the song rapid.

== Distribution and habitat ==
The berrypeckers are generally montane species, with only one, the black berrypecker, being found in lowland forest. In contrast the longbills live in lowland forests and low montane forests as well as on small islands around New Guinea. Amongst the berrypeckers there is a succession of species at different altitudes, with the black berrypecker being found in the lowlands, the mid-mountain berrypecker being found at lower altitudes (mid-montane) and the fan-tailed berrypecker being found near the treeline.

== Behaviour ==
Melanocharitidae species are usually seen alone or in pairs. They may associate with mixed-species feeding flocks, but are loose members and not core species. The diet of the family is dominated by berries and small fruits. Arthropods are also gleaned from foliage, and more rarely by hovering and snatching. They are highly active feeders, seldom pausing except when at berries. Most species feed in the lower and middle levels of the forest, although records suggest that the obscure berrypecker will enter the canopy to forage. The male black berrypecker will also enter the canopy, while the female will remain lower down in the forest, suggesting some level of sexual segregation of feeding niches.

The breeding of some species is entirely undescribed, and little is known about the breeding in most species. Records of nests have been made in both wet and dry seasons. They build a cup nest, usually on a forked branch near the edge of a tree, out of fern scales and plant fibres bound neatly with insect or spider silk and ornamented with lichens. Little is known about the division of labour in the family, although the pattern exhibited by the black berrypecker, where the female constructs the nest alone but both sexes feed the young, may be typical of the family. They lay one or two eggs.

== Status ==
The berrypeckers and longbills are not considered to be threatened by human activities. No species is listed as threatened by the IUCN, although one species, the obscure berrypecker, is listed as data deficient. That species is known officially from two collected specimens, but unconfirmed reports suggest that it is not uncommon in remote parts of New Guinea.

== Species ==
Family: Melanocharitidae

Image	Genus	Living species
	Melanocharis Sclater, 1858	Obscure berrypecker, Melanocharis arfakiana; Black berrypecker, Melanocharis nigra; Mid-mountain berrypecker, Melanocharis longicauda; Fan-tailed berrypecker, Melanocharis versteri; Satin berrypecker, Melanocharis citreola; Streaked berrypecker, Melanocharis striativentris; Thick-billed berrypecker, Melanocharis crassirostris (Note: Formerly in Rhamphocharis, Salvadori, 1876; genus now subsumed into Melanocharis.); Spotted berrypecker, Melanocharis piperata
	Oedistoma Salvadori, 1876	Spectacled longbill, Oedistoma iliolophus; Pygmy longbill, Oedistoma pygmaeum; The spectacled longbill and pygmy longbill are sometimes included in the genus Toxorhamphus, although this is incorrect and violates the principal of priority.
	Toxorhamphus Stresemann, 1914	Yellow-bellied longbill, Toxorhamphus novaeguineae; Slaty-headed longbill, Toxorhamphus poliopterus
