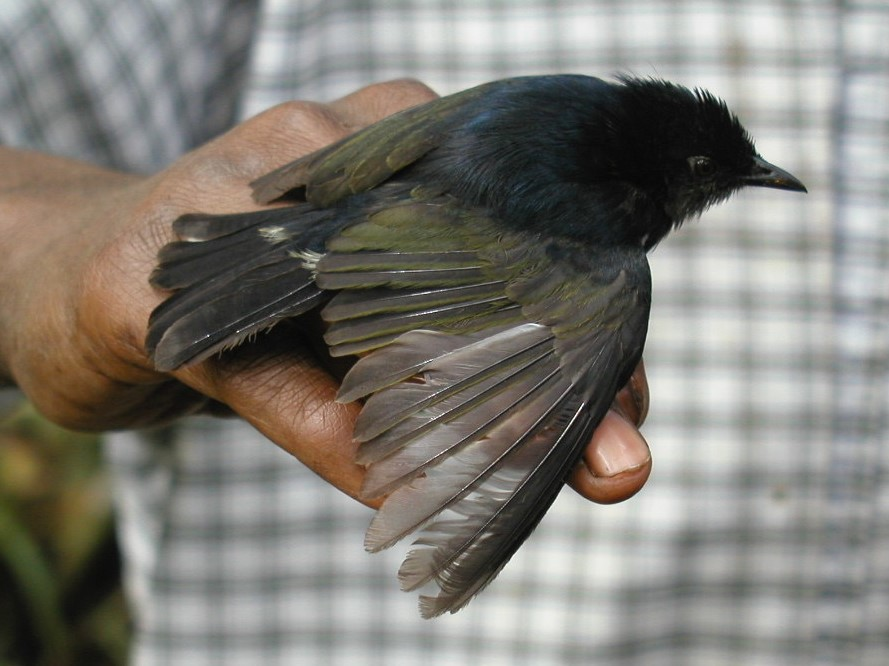

Conservation status
- Least Concern (IUCN 3.1)

Scientific classification
- Kingdom: Animalia
- Phylum: Chordata
- Class: Aves
- Order: Passeriformes
- Family: Melanocharitidae
- Genus: Melanocharis
- Species: M. nigra

Binomial name
- Melanocharis nigra (Lesson, 1830)

= Black berrypecker =

Species of bird

The black berrypecker (Melanocharis nigra) is a species of bird in the family Melanocharitidae. It is found in New Guinea. Its natural habitat is subtropical or tropical moist lowland forest.
