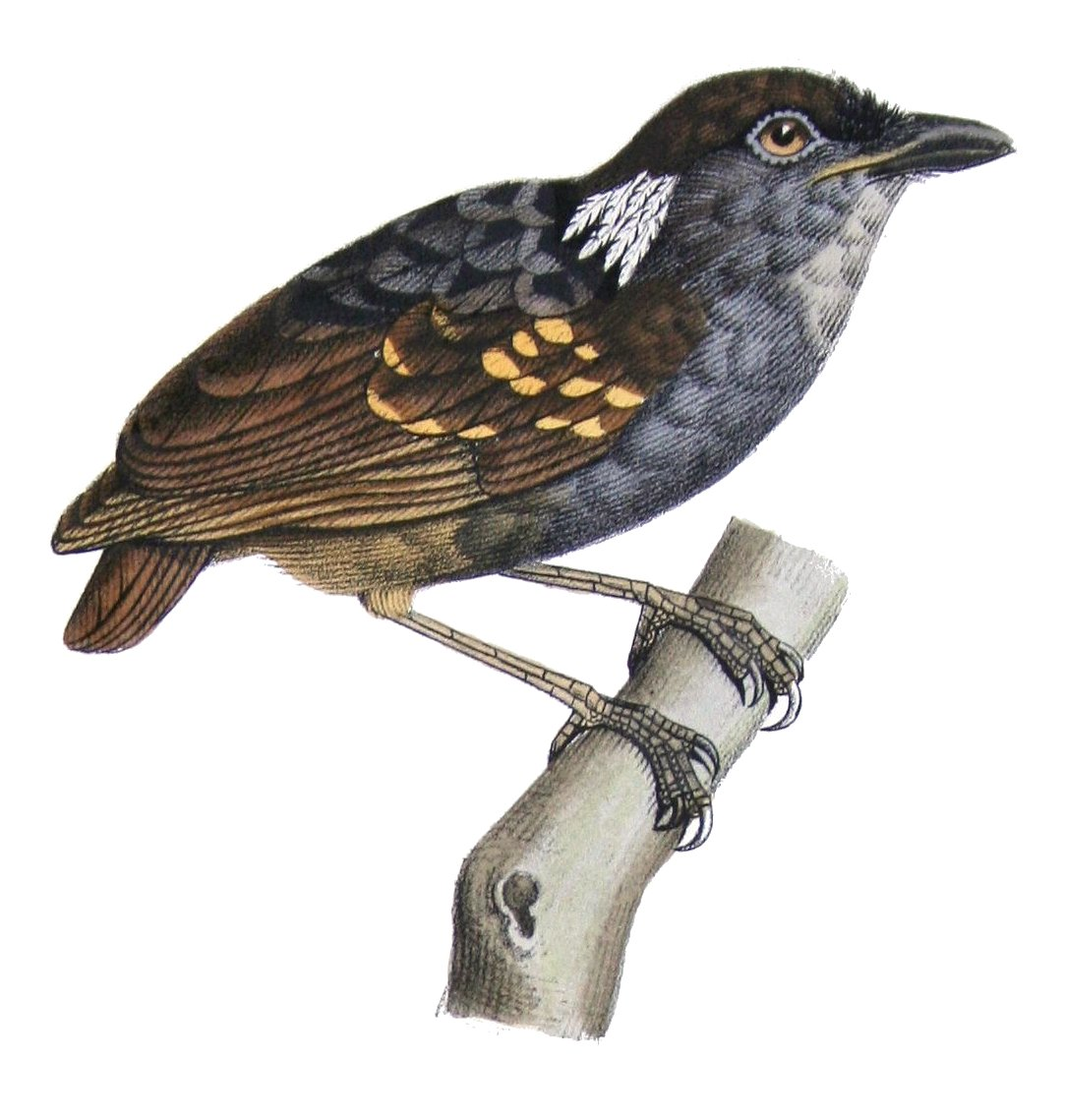

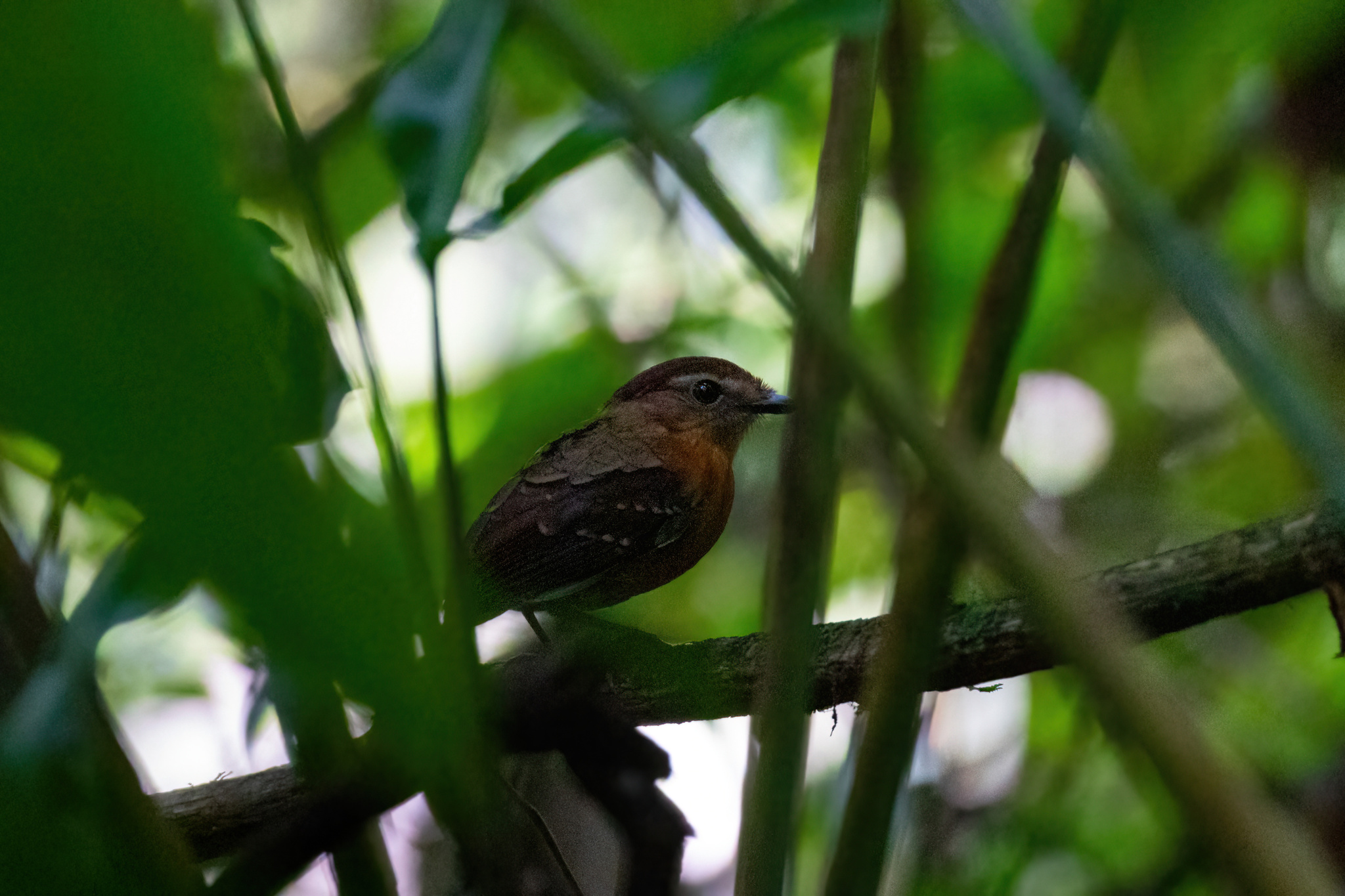

Conservation status
- Least Concern (IUCN 3.1)

Scientific classification
- Kingdom: Animalia
- Phylum: Chordata
- Class: Aves
- Order: Passeriformes
- Family: Conopophagidae
- Genus: Conopophaga
- Species: C. peruviana

Binomial name
- Conopophaga peruviana Des Murs, 1856

= Ash-throated gnateater =

Species of bird

The ash-throated gnateater (Conopophaga peruviana) is a species of bird in the family Conopophagidae. It is found in Bolivia, Brazil, Ecuador, and Peru.

== Taxonomy and systematics ==
The placement of ash-throated gnateater in a linear sequence remains unsettled. The Clements taxonomy places it between chestnut-belted gnateater (Conopophaga aurita) and Ceara gnateater (C. cearae), while the International Ornithological Committee (IOC) places it between hooded gnateater (C. roberti) and Ceara gnateater, with chestnut-belted gnateater preceding hooded. It is monotypic.

== Description ==
The ash-throated gnateater is 11 to 12 cm (4.3 to 4.7 in) long and weighs 22 to 26 g (0.78 to 0.92 oz). The male's face, back, and breast are gray, with the back being darker and having a brownish wash. The crown is brownish, the throat white, and there is a white tuft behind the eye. The lower belly is brown. The female's face and breast are rufous and the upper parts are brown.

== Distribution and habitat ==
The ash-throated gnateater is found in the upper Amazon Basin in eastern Ecuador, eastern Peru, far western Brazil, and slightly into Bolivia's La Paz Department. It primarily inhabits the open understory of terra firme forest, especially vine tangles and treefalls. It can also be found in várzea forest and on slopes and ridgetops. In much of its range it is found up to 600 m (2,000 ft), but usually only up to 400 m (1,300 ft) in Bolivia and occasionally as high as 1,000 m (3,300 ft) in Peru.

== Behavior ==
=== Feeding ===
The ash-throated gnateater forages on or near the ground for small arthropods.

=== Breeding ===
Little has been published about the ash-throated gnateater's breeding habits. The few described nests were shallow cups placed less than 1 m (3.3 ft) above the ground.

=== Vocalization ===
The ash-throated gnateater's song has been described as "hollow-sounding hwrickik! notes and as a "bisyllabic 'sneezing sound'" . One of its calls is .

== Status ==
The IUCN has assessed the ash-throated gnateater as being of Least Concern. Although it is generally uncommon, it occurs in several protected areas.
