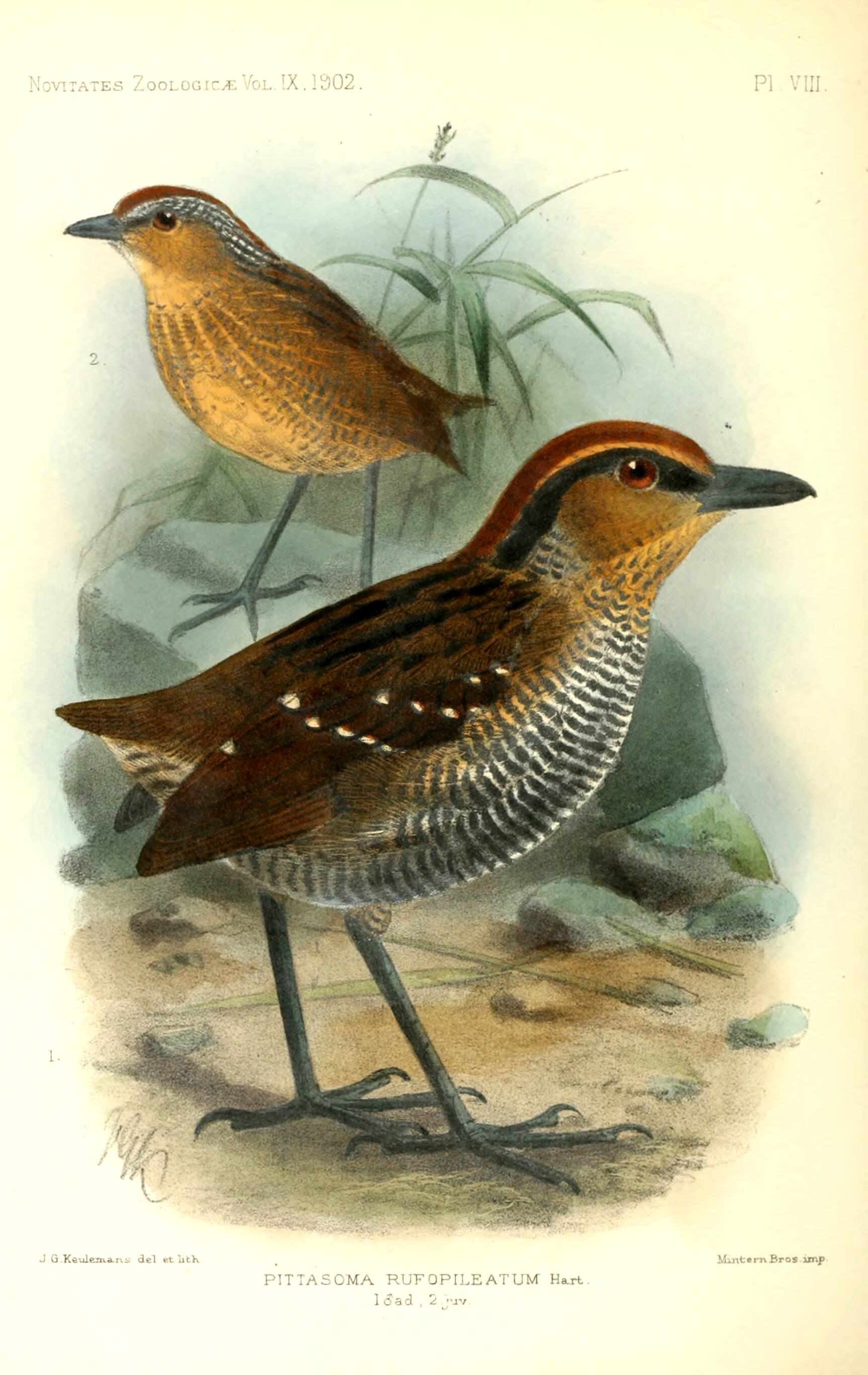
- Rufous-crowned antpitta, Pittasoma rufopileatum

Scientific classification
- Kingdom: Animalia
- Phylum: Chordata
- Class: Aves
- Order: Passeriformes
- Family: Conopophagidae
- Genus: Pittasoma; Cassin, 1860

Type species
- Pittasoma michleri Cassin, 1860

Species
- P. michleri P. rufopileatum

= Pittasoma =

Genus of birds

Pittasoma is a genus of birds in the gnateater family. Its two members breed in subtropical or tropical moist forest in South and Central America, specifically the Chocó, and Panama and Costa Rica. Formerly placed in the family Formicariidae, they were reclassified to Conopophagidae following analysis of mtDNA cytochrome b and NADH dehydrogenase subunit 2 sequences (Rice, 2005a,b). The association between the genus Pittasoma and the 'traditional' gnateaters is also supported by traits in their natural history, morphology, vocalizations (Rice, 2005a).

They are round, short-tailed, and long-legged birds, 16–19 cm (6-7½ inches) in length, making them the largest members of the gnateater family. These terrestrial birds are quite upright when standing. Sexes differ in plumage, but sexual dichromatism is less pronounced than in most members of the other gnateater genus, Conopophaga. They are insectivorous.

== Species ==
Image	Scientific name	Common name	Distribution
	Pittasoma michleri	Black-crowned antpitta	Colombia, Costa Rica, and Panama.
	Pittasoma rufopileatum	Rufous-crowned antpitta	Colombia and Ecuador.
