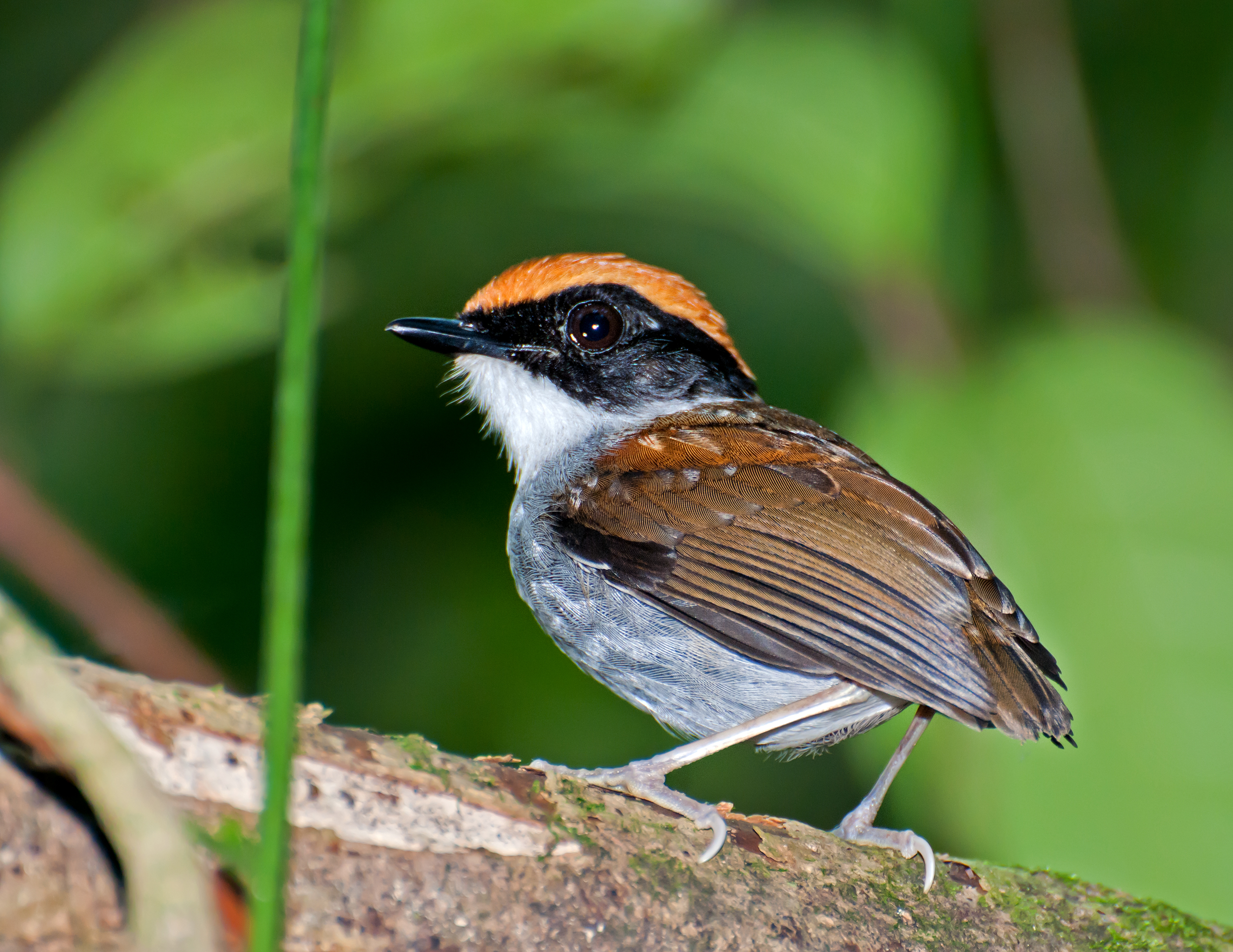
- Adult male in São Paulo, Brazil
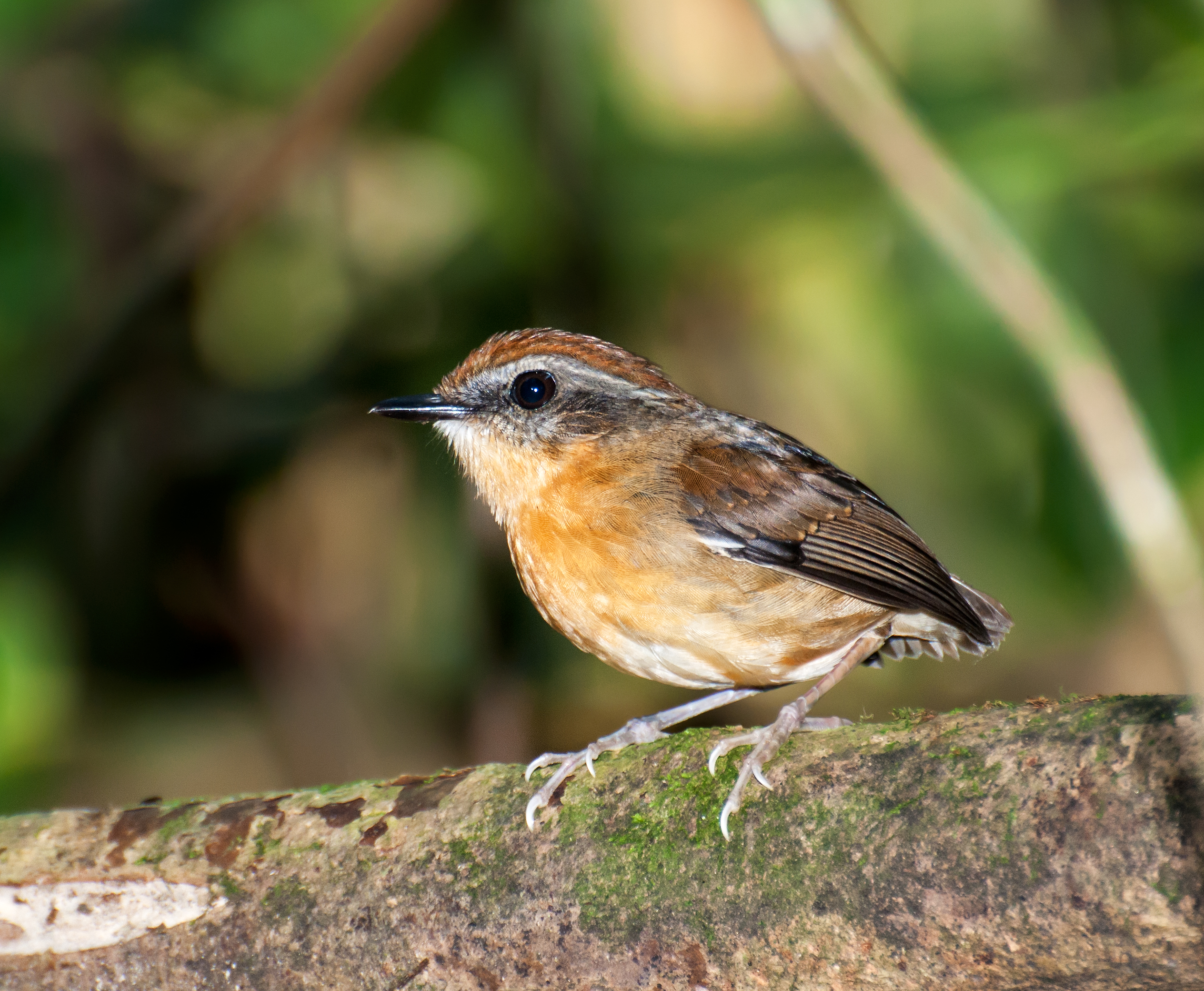
- Adult female in São Paulo, Brazil

Conservation status
- Least Concern (IUCN 3.1)

Scientific classification
- Kingdom: Animalia
- Phylum: Chordata
- Class: Aves
- Order: Passeriformes
- Family: Conopophagidae
- Genus: Conopophaga
- Species: C. melanops

Binomial name
- Conopophaga melanops (Vieillot, 1818)

= Black-cheeked gnateater =

Species of bird

The black-cheeked gnateater (Conopophaga melanops) is a species of bird in the family Conopophagidae endemic to Brazil. The male is distinguished by its orange crown, black face and white throat, while the female has brown plumage.

== Taxonomy ==
French naturalist Louis Pierre Vieillot described the black-cheeked gnateater in 1818, giving it the species name melanops from the Ancient Greek words melas "black" and ops "face". The black-cheeked gnateater has three subspecies:

- C. m. perspicillata (Lichtenstein, MHK, 1823) - Bahia and Sergipe (eastern Brazil)
- C. m. melanops (Vieillot, 1818) - southeastern Brazil
- C. m. nigrifrons Pinto, 1954 - Paraíba to Alagoas (eastern Brazil)

== Description ==
Measuring 11.5 cm (4.5 in), the black-cheeked gnateater is a small round bird with a short tail. It exhibits sexual dimorphism, as the male has distinctive coloured plumage and the female is a more overall brown in color. The male has a black face and cheeks with a contrasting orange crown and white throat. The upperparts are brownish and the underparts pale grey, the belly feathers more white and the flanks tending to buff. The female is more brown above with a white eyebrow and buff patch on the wings. It resembles the rufous gnateater.

== Distribution and habitat ==
The black-cheeked gnateater is found in eastern Brazil, from Paraíba to Santa Catarina. Its natural habitat is subtropical or tropical moist lowland forests, where it is a bird of the understory and forest floor. Its range along the eastern coastal areas of Brazil has been fragmented by destruction of habitat. Despite the showy plumage, this and other gnateaters are furtive and not often seen.

== Behaviour ==
The black-cheeked gnateater is monogamous and territorial, the average size for a territory measured at 2.94 hectares. Breeding takes place over three months and the platform-like nest is constructed on branches or a palm leaf near the ground. A clutch of two eggs is laid.
