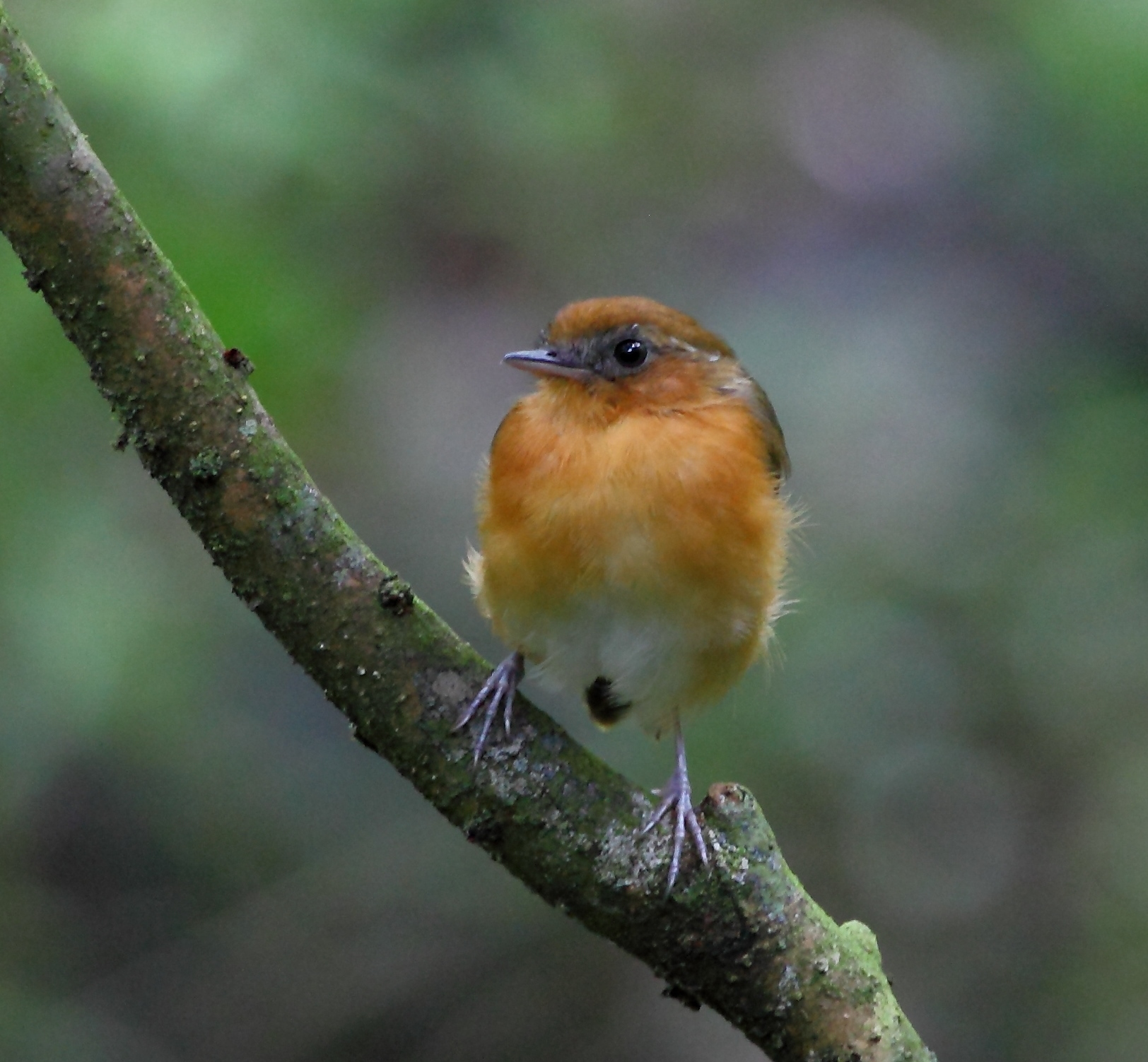

Conservation status
- Near Threatened (IUCN 3.1)

Scientific classification
- Kingdom: Animalia
- Phylum: Chordata
- Class: Aves
- Order: Passeriformes
- Family: Conopophagidae
- Genus: Conopophaga
- Species: C. cearae

Binomial name
- Conopophaga cearae Cory, 1916

Synonyms
- Conopophaga lineata cearae

= Ceará gnateater =

Species of bird

The Ceará Gnateater or Caatinga Gnateater (Conopophaga cearae) is a passerine bird of the gnateater family, Conopophagidae. It is found in forest understory and bushes in northeastern Brazil.

The Ceara Gnateater is locally called "chupa-dente", or "tooth-sucker" in Portuguese due to the sound it produces when it vocalizes.

== Appearance ==
They are about 11.5 to 14 cm (4.5 to 5.5 in) long and weigh on average 24.5g (0.86 oz).

The Ceará Gnateater used to be considered a subspecies of the Rufous Gnateater (Conopophaga lineata), but genetic evidence showed they are distinct species. They were split into two different independent taxa in 2015. The vocalization of the two species is similar, but the Ceara Gnateater has a lower-pitched song that is slightly slower than that of the Rufous Gnateater. They are also different in appearance. Ceará Gnateaters have a more vivid orange or apricot color with a white belly patch and a bight eye line, while Rufous Gnateaters have a dirty orange to brown color with a light grey belly and a duller grey eye line.

== Distribution and habitat ==
Ceará Gnateaters are endemic to a small region in northeastern Brazil in isolated patches of Atlantic Forest in higher elevations. They can be found in these Brazilian states: Ceará, Pernambuco, Paraíba, Rio Grande Do Norte, and Alagoas. They are predominantly found in dense understory where they nest and forage.

== Diet ==
As their name would imply, Ceara Gnateaters are insectivores. They dominate the understory and forage close to the forest floor usually perching in vertical branches. Once prey is captured, such as small arthropods or beetles, they head to the safety of dense underbrush. They forage alone or with their mate. While their territories are generally small, Ceara Gnateaters do not mix with other groups to forage, a behavior observed in all other species of the family Conopophagidae.

== Reproduction ==
Similar to most gnateaters, this species is monogamous. Pairs remain together throughout the year. Mated-pairs may avoid mixed-species flocks found in the understory.

Courtship involve males erecting their white ear tufts and chasing females while performing simple aerial displays. It is believed that their primary feathers are modified to produce a specialized flight call while flying from one perch to another, although this has not been proven or investigated. Both sexes perform the flight call and it seems to be associated with territorial defense but could also be involved in courtship.

Nest building involves placing twigs and leaves in low branches or shrubs to create a camouflaged cup-nest. Similar to other Gnateater species, its clutch consists of 2 eggs, but often only one survives to fledge. Males aid the females in incubation. Incubating adults attempt to camouflage themselves when predators approach by shrinking into the nest and often rely on shadows to hide their rufous color. Although little is known about this species reproduction, many of the behaviors seem to be similar to that of other Gnateaters. In Chestnut-belted Gnateaters adults will only fly if predators are dangerously close to the nests and females seem to lure predators away using a "broken-wing display" in which they feign an injury to distract away from the nest. This behavior is intensified when nestlings are in later stages of development, such as close to fledging.

== Conservation status ==
There has been conflicting information on this species endangered status. Its population is considered stable, but there has been a lack of studies regarding actual population numbers. Some sources say its status should be changed to vulnerable due to its restricted range which makes it susceptible to habitat loss.

AQUASIS is a non-profit organization that works in the Brazilian state of Ceará to prevent the extinction of endangered species. In July of 2025, the NGO started working on a project in partnership with students from the Cornell Lab of Ornithology to help the Ceara Gnateater by reintroducing the species to the mountain range of Serra de Aratanha. In the state of Ceará the species currently occurs only in the mountains of Serra de Baturité, and the translocation of individuals from Baturité to Aratanha is an attempt to help increase the population of this species in the long term, and also rewild the forests in Aratanha with the locally extinct biodiversity.
