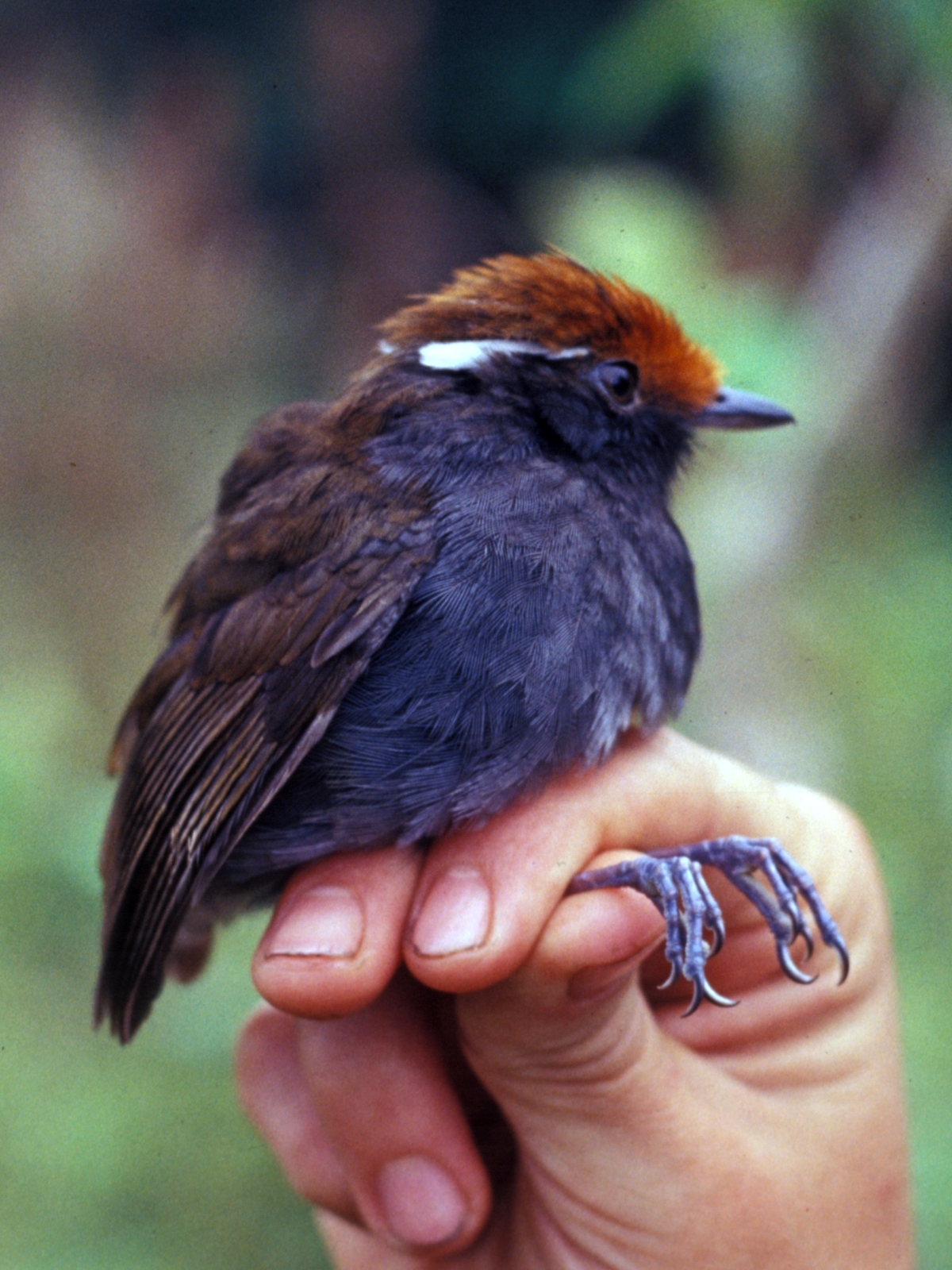
- Male (above) and female (below)
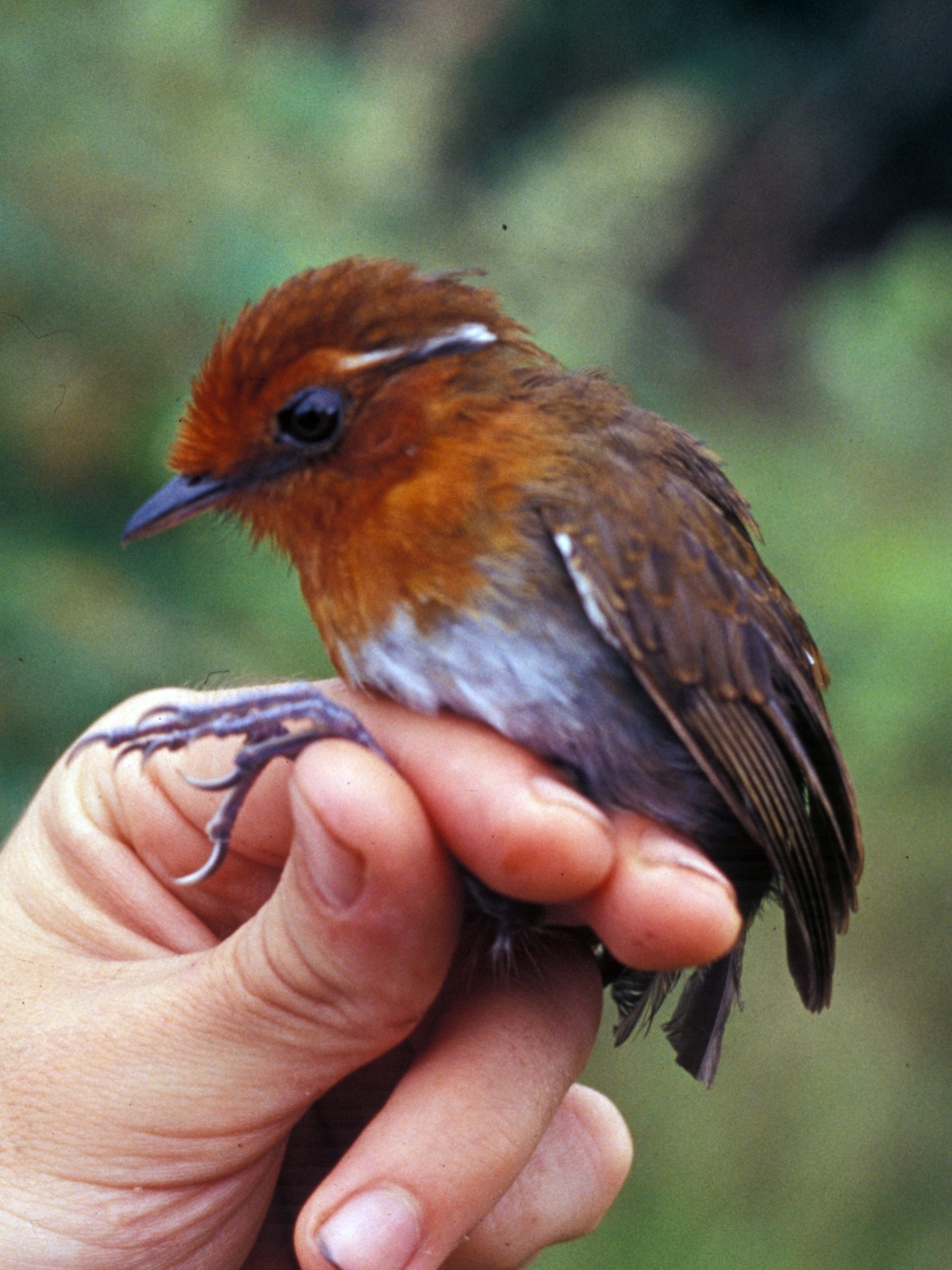

Conservation status
- Least Concern (IUCN 3.1)

Scientific classification
- Kingdom: Animalia
- Phylum: Chordata
- Class: Aves
- Order: Passeriformes
- Family: Conopophagidae
- Genus: Conopophaga
- Species: C. castaneiceps

Binomial name
- Conopophaga castaneiceps Sclater, PL, 1857

Subspecies
- See text

= Chestnut-crowned gnateater =

Species of bird

The chestnut-crowned gnateater (Conopophaga castaneiceps) is a species of bird in the family Conopophagidae. It is found in Colombia, Ecuador, and Peru.

== Taxonomy and systematics ==
The position of the chestnut-crowned gnateater in linear format is unsettled. The International Ornithological Committee (IOC) and the Clements taxonomy place it differently within the gnateater family.

Four subspecies are recognized, though birds on the western slope of Colombia's Central Andes might be an unnamed taxon:

- C. c. chocoensis Chapman (1915)
- C. c. castaneiceps Sclater (1857)
- C. c. chapmani Carriker (1933)
- C. c. brunneinucha von Berlepsch & Stolzmann (1896)

== Description ==
The chestnut-crowned gnateater is 13 to 14 cm (5.1 to 5.5 in) long. The mean weight of seven specimens was 27.6 g (0.97 oz). The male of the nominate subspecies has brown upper parts; a gray face, throat, and chest; and orange-brown flanks and vent area. The top of the head is orange-red and there is a white tuft behind the eye. C. c. chapmani has a brighter (less brown) crown. C. c. brunneinucha's orange-red is only the forehead; it is darker overall and has a white patch on the belly. C. c. chocoensis is similar to brunneinucha but is smaller, has less gray, has a more olive tinge to the back, and more orange-red on the crown. The female's head and chest are orange-red and the belly is whitish. The white plume behind the eye is smaller than that of the male.

== Distribution and habitat ==
The chestnut-crowned gnateater occurs in discontinuous areas from central Colombia to south-central Peru. C. c. chocoensis is found in Colombia on the western slope of the Western Andes and in the Serranía del Baudó of western Chocó Department. C. c. castaneiceps is found in Colombia's Central and Eastern Andes and into Ecuador. C. c. chapmani is found on the east slope of the Andes from southern Ecuador to the Department of San Martín in northern Peru. C. c. brunneinucha is found on the east slope of the Peruvian Andes from Huánuco south to Cuzco. It inhabits subtropical and tropical rainforest. Though it lives in the forest interior, it prefers smaller vegetation there in openings such as regrowing landslides. It ranges in elevation mostly between 1,000 and 2,000 m (3,300 and 6,600 ft) but has been found as low as 500 to 600 m (1,600 to 2,000 ft) in Colombia and Ecuador and as high as about 2,200 m (7,200 ft) in Peru.

== Behavior ==
=== Feeding ===
The chestnut-crowned gnateater forages for arthropods in leaf litter and foliage on and near the ground.

=== Breeding ===
Little is known about the chestnut-crowned gnateater's breeding phenology. A nest found in February in Colombia was a hidden cup placed less than 1 m (3.3 ft) above ground. Birds were noted in breeding condition between March and June in Colombia's Central Andes.

=== Vocalization ===
The chesnut-crowned gnateater's song is "a series of frog-like, slightly disyllabic notes" that accelerate and get louder after the first one or two notes. Its calls include a "harsh 'zhiek!'" and a "lower 'schek'".

== Status ==
The IUCN has assessed the chestnut-crowned gnateater as being of Least Concern. It is not common in parts of its range but does occur in at least one protected area. It might benefit from the dense vegetation that grows in human-disturbed areas.
