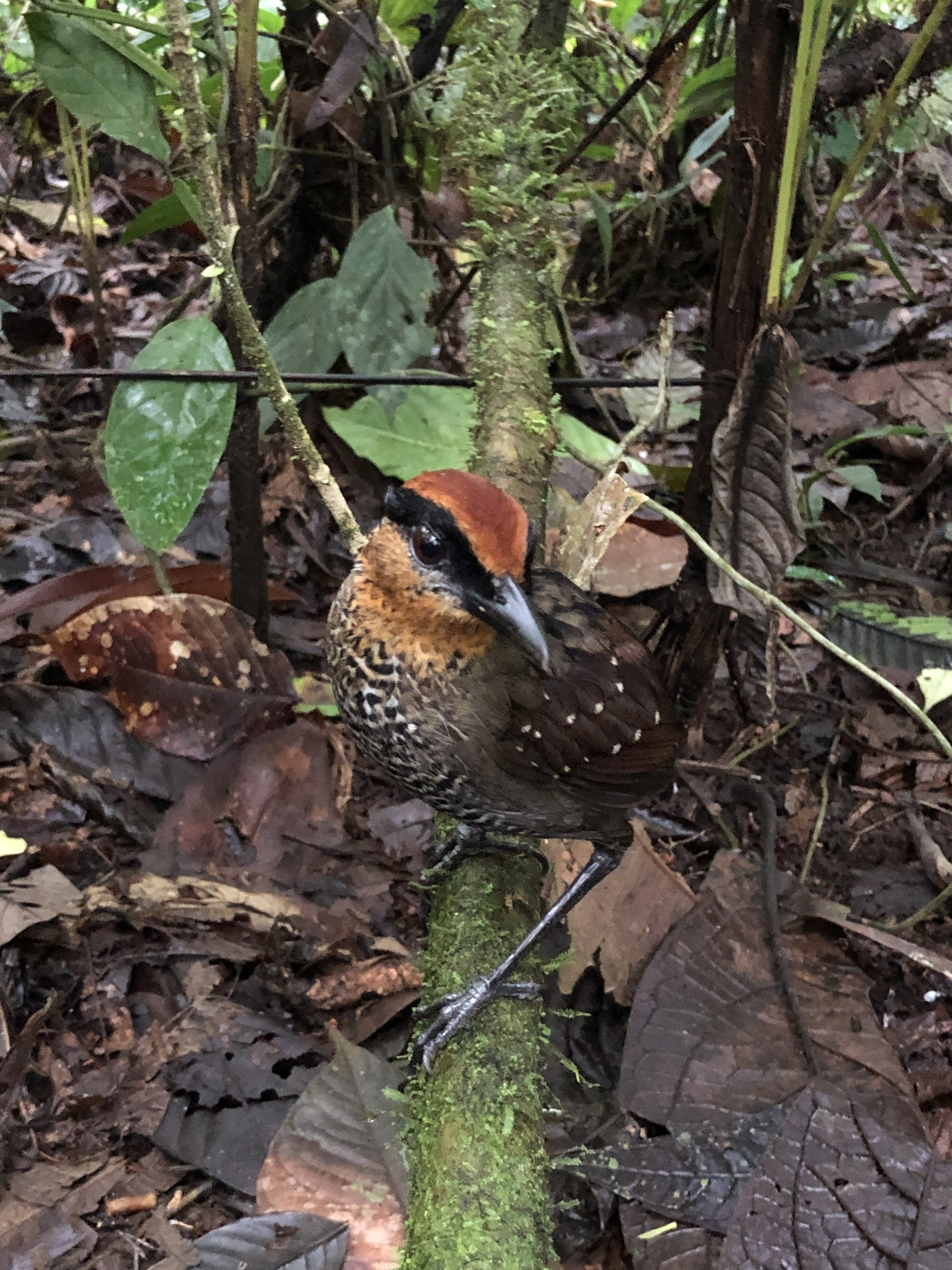

Conservation status
- Near Threatened (IUCN 3.1)

Scientific classification
- Kingdom: Animalia
- Phylum: Chordata
- Class: Aves
- Order: Passeriformes
- Family: Conopophagidae
- Genus: Pittasoma
- Species: P. rufopileatum

Binomial name
- Pittasoma rufopileatum Hartert, 1901

= Rufous-crowned antpitta =

Species of bird

The rufous-crowned antpitta or rufous-crowned pittasoma (Pittasoma rufopileatum) is a species of bird in the gnateater family, Conopophagidae. It is found in Colombia and Ecuador.

== Taxonomy and systematics ==
The position of the two species in genus Pittasoma in linear format is unsettled. The International Ornithological Committee (IOC) and the Clements taxonomy place them differently within the gnateater family. Three subspecies of rufous-crowned antpitta are recognized, the nominate Pittasoma rufopileatum rufopileatum, P. r. rosenbergi, and P. r. harterti. It has been suggested that harterti should be merged into the nominate subspecies.

== Description ==
The rufous-crowned antpitta is 15 to 18 cm (5.9 to 7.1 in) long. One male specimen weighed 96 g (3.4 oz) and a female 97 g (3.4 oz). In body shape it resembles the "true" antpittas of family Grallariidae. The nominate male's crown is bright rufous with a bold black band below it. Its face is yellowish. The upper parts of the body are olive brown with a scaly appearance. The wings are brownish and have small white spots. The throat and crissum (the area around the cloaca) are buffy and the flanks a yellowish buff. Wavy black barring covers most of the under parts. The nominate female is similar, but the crown is not as bright, the black band is smaller, and the face is more rufous. The underside is creamier and the black barring is less prominent.

P. r. rosenbergi is similar to the nominate but it is smaller and its colors are duller. Both sexes' heads are rufuous rather than just the crown, and the underside does not have the black bars. P. r. harterti is intermediate between the nominate and rosenbergi. The entire face is rufous and it has barring on the underside.

== Distribution and habitat ==
The rufous-crowned antpitta is found on the Pacific slope of Colombia and Ecuador. P. r. rosenbergi is the furthest north; it occurs only in Chocó Department of Colombia. P. r. harterti occurs in western Nariño Department, also in Colombia. The nominate occurs in Ecuador's Esmeraldas and Pichincha Provinces. The rufous-crowned antpitta inhabits humid forests in the lowlands and foothills of the Chocó biogeographic region up to 1,100 m (3,600 ft) elevation. No details of its preferences within that biome have been documented.

== Behavior ==
=== Feeding ===
Almost nothing is known about the rufous-crowned antpitta's diet or feeding habits. One specimen's stomach contained insects and spiders.

=== Breeding ===
Data are also scarce about the rufous-crowned antpitta's breeding habits. Two specimens in breeding condition have been documented in Colombia, a female in November and a male in February.

=== Vocalization ===
The rufous-crowned antpitta's song is a "piercing keeee-yurh note". Its alarm call is "a decelerating chatter"

== Status ==
The IUCN has assessed the rufous-crowned antpitta as Near Threatened. Its habitat is undergoing rapid deforestation and its population is experiencing "a moderately rapid population decline."
