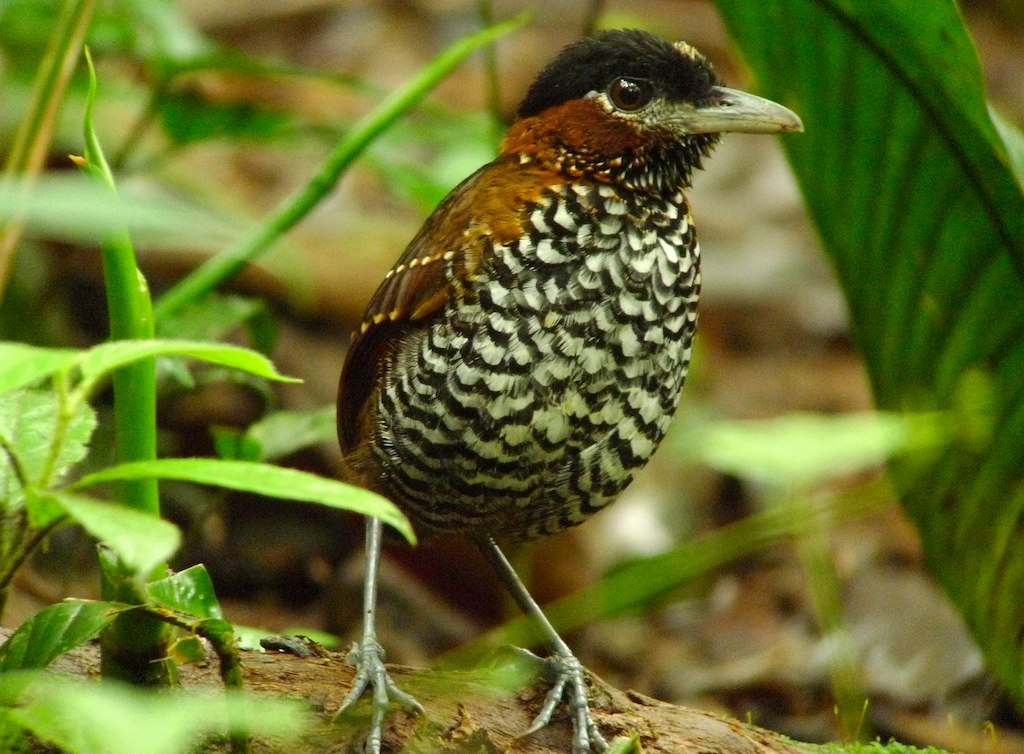
- In Panama

Conservation status
- Least Concern (IUCN 3.1)

Scientific classification
- Kingdom: Animalia
- Phylum: Chordata
- Class: Aves
- Order: Passeriformes
- Family: Conopophagidae
- Genus: Pittasoma
- Species: P. michleri

Binomial name
- Pittasoma michleri Cassin, 1860

= Black-crowned antpitta =

Species of bird

The black-crowned antpitta (Pittasoma michleri) is a species of bird in the gnateater family, Conopophagidae. It is found in Colombia, Costa Rica, and Panama. Its natural habitat is subtropical or tropical moist foothill forests.

== Taxonomy and systematics ==
The black-crowned antpitta is one of two species in the genus Pittasoma. They are not in the antpitta family (Grallaridae). It was formerly placed in the antthrush family (Formicariidae) before being included in the antpitta family when it was split from the antthrushes. They were reclassified and placed in the family Conopophagidae based on DNA evidence. This placement is further supported by morphology, vocalisations and traits in their natural history.

The generic name Pittasoma comes from the genus Pitta and the Greek sōma, meaning "body". The specific name is in honor of Brigadier-General Nathaniel Michler. Alternative names for the black-crowned antpitta include the black-crowned pittasoma or black-crowned gnatpitta.

=== Subspecies ===
There are two recognised subspecies:

- P. m. michleri - Cassin, 1860: The nominate subspecies, it is found in most of Panama and extreme northwestern Colombia.
- P. m. zeledoni - Ridgway, 1884: Occurs in the Caribbean slope of Costa Rica and in western Panama. The subspecific name is in honor of José Castulo Zeledón.

== Description ==
The black-crowned antpitta is 18–19 cm long and weighs 99–110 grams.

== Distribution and habitat ==
The black-crowned antpitta is found in Panama, Costa Rica, and northwestern Colombia. It mostly inhabits altitudes between 300 and 1000 m in Costa Rica, but is also found in lowlands in Panama.

== Behaviour and ecology ==
=== Diet ===
Feeds on invertebrates such as insects, spiders, amblypygi, and scorpions along with small vertebrates such as frogs and small reptiles.
