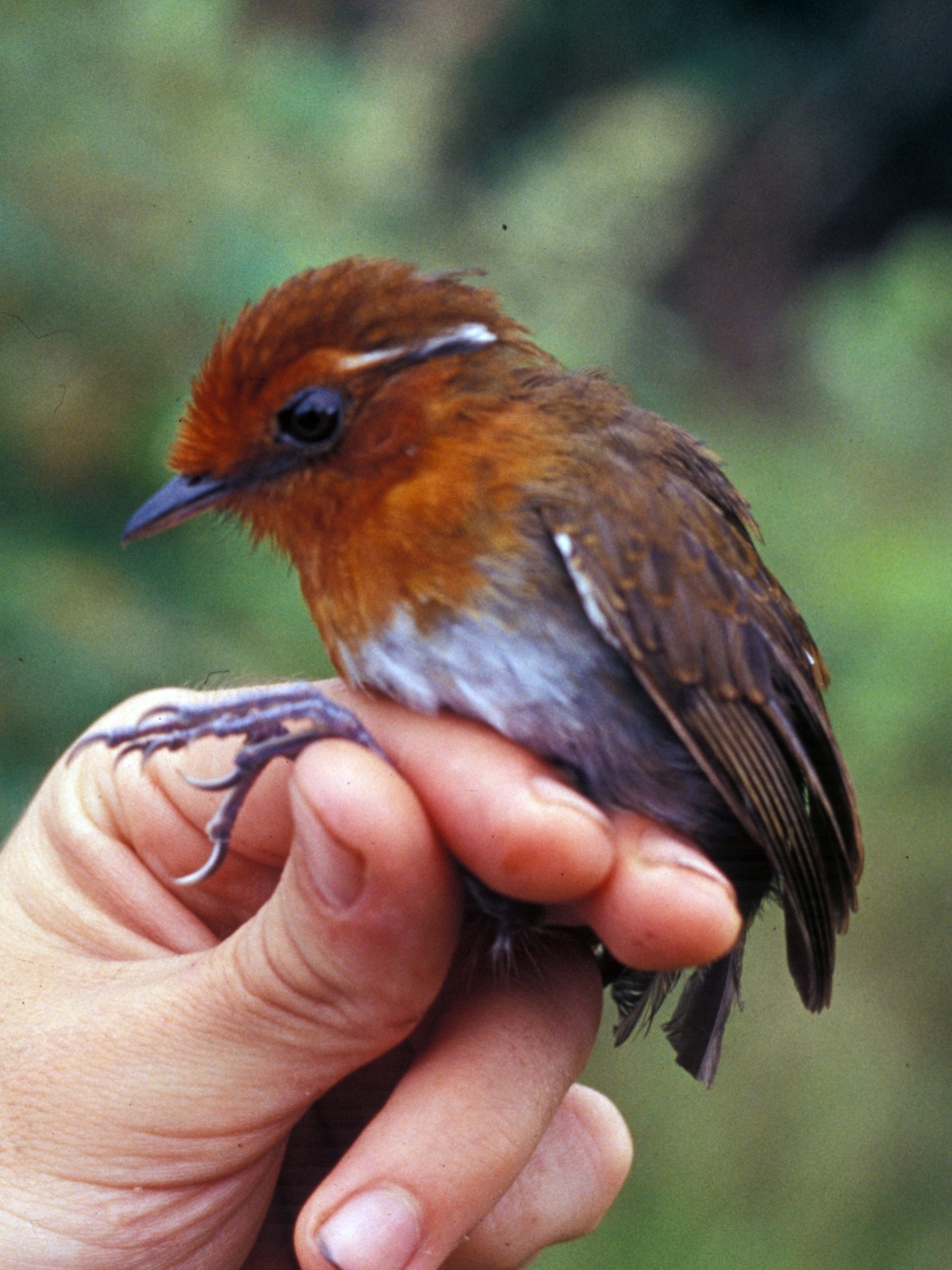
- Chestnut-crowned gnateater (Conopophaga castaneiceps)

Scientific classification
- Kingdom: Animalia
- Phylum: Chordata
- Class: Aves
- Order: Passeriformes
- Parvorder: Furnariida
- Family: Conopophagidae; Garrod, 1877

Genera
- Conopophaga Vieillot, 1816; Pittasoma Cassin, 1860

= Gnateater =

Gnateaters

Family of birds

The gnateaters are a bird family, Conopophagidae, consisting of twelve small suboscine passerine species in two genera, which occur in South and Central America.

== Taxonomy ==
The family Conopophagidae was introduced in 1877 by the English zoologist Alfred Henry Garrod. The family was formerly restricted to the gnateater genus Conopophaga, but a molecular phylogenetic study published in 2005 found that the genus Pittasoma in the family Formicariidae was sister to Conopophaga. The association between this genus and Conopophaga is also supported by traits in their natural history, morphology, and vocalizations. The members of this family are very closely related to the antbirds and less closely to the antpittas and tapaculos. Due to their remote and dim habitat, gnateaters are a barely studied and poorly known family of birds.

== Description ==
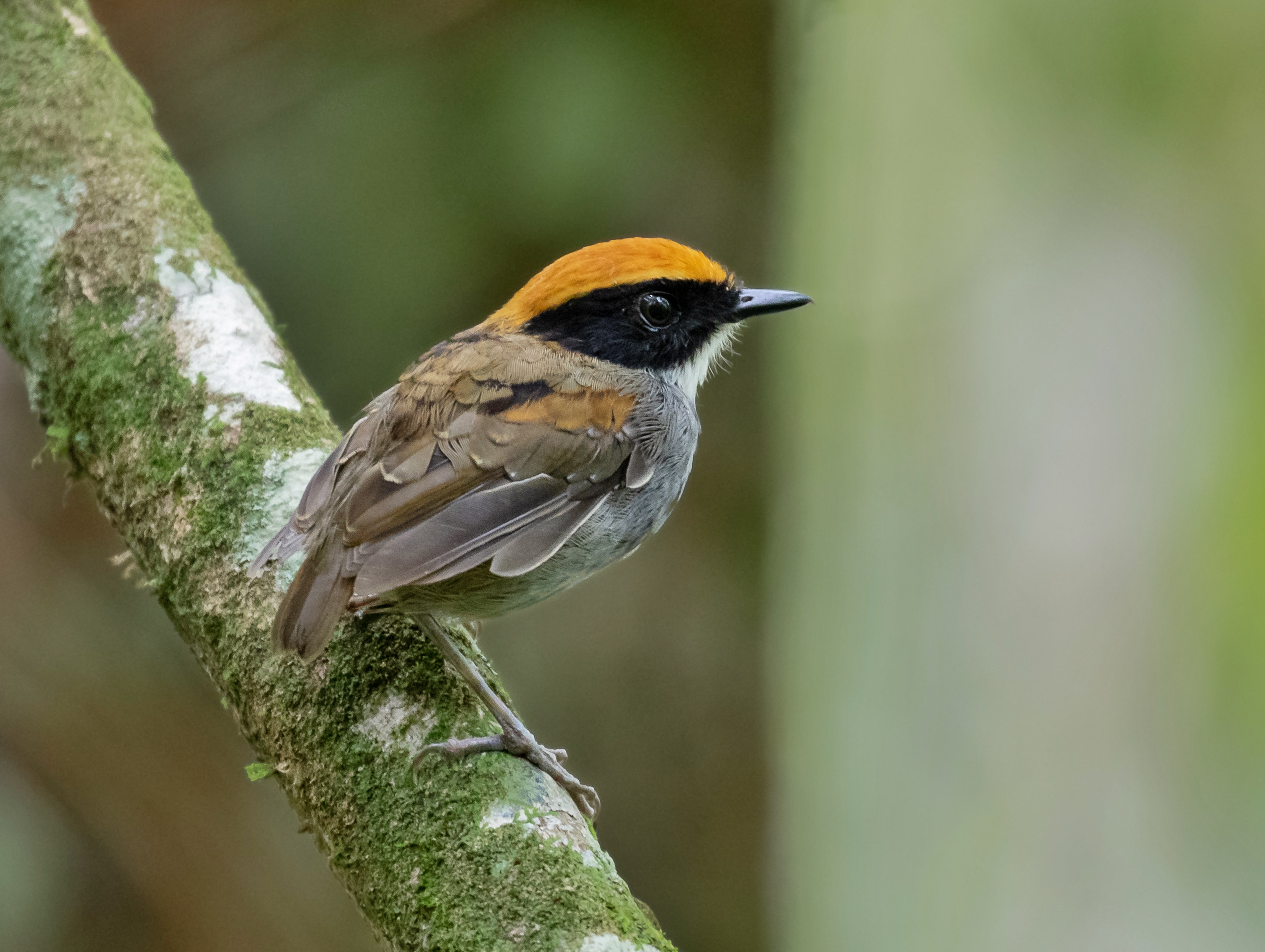
Black-cheeked gnateater

They are round, short-tailed, and long-legged birds, about 12–15.5 cm (4.7–6.1 in) in length, with Pittasoma being larger than Conopophaga. They are quite upright when standing. All species are sexually dimorphic, although the extent of this varies greatly. Most Conopophaga species have a white tuft behind the eye.

== Distribution and habitat ==
Gnateaters are birds of the forest understory, bamboo stands, and the forest floor. The members of the genus Conopophaga are found in the Amazon and Orinoco basins, east and central Andean slopes, Atlantic Forest, and nearby regions, while the members of the genus Pittasoma are found in the Chocó, and Panama and Costa Rica. Some species live in impenetrable thickets; others live in more open forest. Most are entirely restricted to humid habitats, but several species extend into drier regions in eastern Brazil. While the members of the genus Conopophaga are always found near the forest floor, typically not rising more than 1.5 m above the ground, they also rarely travel or spend much time on the ground (though they do feed there; see diet). The members of the genus Pittasoma are more commonly seen hopping around on the ground.

== Behaviour and ecology ==
=== Food and feeding ===
Gnateaters are insectivorous as the group name implies. The members of the genus Conopophaga feed mostly using two methods. One is to perch above the forest floor until prey is spotted, then lunge down to the ground to snatch it. Having landed on the ground to snatch the prey, it will not stay on the forest floor for more than a couple of seconds. The second method used is to glean insects directly from the foliage, trunks, and branches of low vegetation. Typical prey items include spiders, caterpillars, insect larvae, grasshoppers and beetles; individuals of some species have also been observed eating fruit and in one case a frog. Very little information is available on the diet of the two Pittasoma, but they are presumably also insectivorous.

== Species list ==
The family contains 12 species in two genera.

Image	Genus	Living species
	Conopophaga Vieillot, 1816	Rufous gnateater, Conopophaga lineata; Chestnut-belted gnateater, Conopophaga aurita; Black-breasted gnateater, Conopophaga snethlageae; Hooded gnateater, Conopophaga roberti; Ash-throated gnateater, Conopophaga peruviana; Ceará gnateater, Conopophaga cearae; Slaty gnateater, Conopophaga ardesiaca; Chestnut-crowned gnateater, Conopophaga castaneiceps; Black-cheeked gnateater, Conopophaga melanops; Black-bellied gnateater, Conopophaga melanogaster
	Pittasoma Cassin, 1860	Black-crowned antpitta, Pittasoma michleri; Rufous-crowned antpitta, Pittasoma rufopileatum
