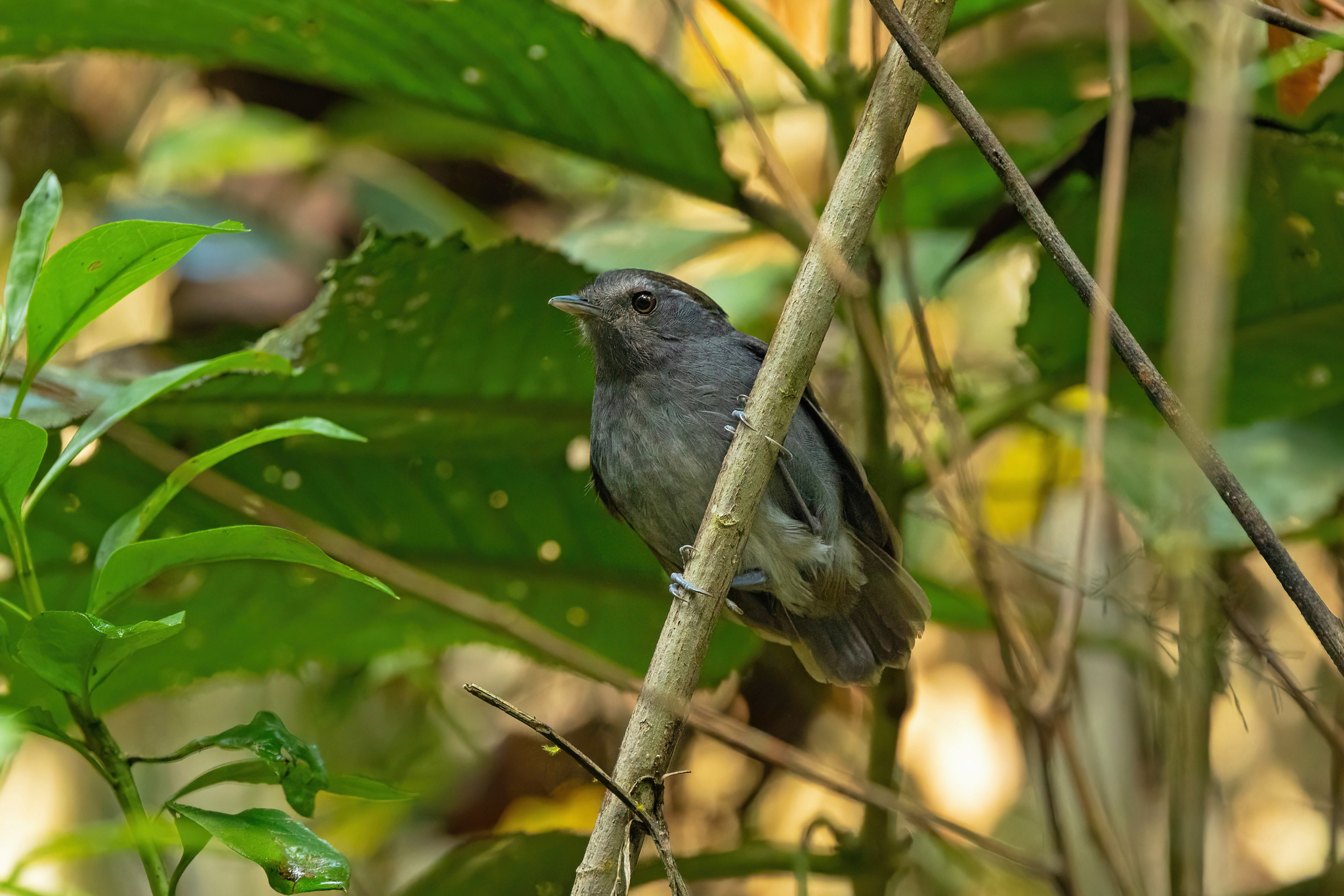

Conservation status
- Least Concern (IUCN 3.1)

Scientific classification
- Kingdom: Animalia
- Phylum: Chordata
- Class: Aves
- Order: Passeriformes
- Family: Conopophagidae
- Genus: Conopophaga
- Species: C. ardesiaca

Binomial name
- Conopophaga ardesiaca D'Orbigny & Lafresnaye, 1837

Subspecies
- See text

= Slaty gnateater =

Species of bird

The slaty gnateater (Conopophaga ardesiaca) is a species of bird in the family Conopophagidae. It is found in Bolivia and Peru.

== Taxonomy and systematics ==
The position of the slaty gnateater in linear format is unsettled. The International Ornithological Committee (IOC) and the Clements taxonomy place it differently within the gnateater family. There are several color variants, and "Further research and, probably, taxonomic revision [are] required." The slaty gnateater has two subspecies, the nominate Conopophaga ardesiaca ardesiaca (D'Orbigny & Lafresnaye, 1837) and C. a. saturata (von Berlepsch & Stolzmann, 1906).

== Description ==
The slaty gnateater is 12.5 to 14 cm (4.9 to 5.5 in) long, and 57 specimens had a mean weight of 26.3 g (0.93 oz). The plumage is variable, but the typical male's head is mostly dark gray that continues through most of the underparts. The crown and upper parts are brown and the flanks and lower belly are brownish gray. It has a white tuft behind the eye. Birds in the Cochabamba Department of Bolivia are much darker. The female has more brown on the face, the white tuft is much smaller, and there is a white patch on the belly. The upper parts can be dark brown, olive brown, or rufous brown.

== Distribution and habitat ==
The slaty gnateater inhabits the narrow band of the Yungas on the eastern slope of the Andes. C. a. saturata is found in Peru from southeastern Cusco Province south towards Bolivia. C. a. ardesiaca is found from the Department of Puno in southeastern Peru to Bolivia's Tarija Department. The species inhabits dense growth in rainforest, typically around treefalls, road edges, and similar openings. In elevation it typically ranges from 800 to 1,800 m (2,600 to 5,900 ft) but is found locally to 2,450 m (8,040 ft) in Peru.

== Behavior ==
=== Feeding ===
The slaty gnateater forages for arthropods in leaf litter and foliage on and near the ground.

=== Breeding ===
Very little is known about the slaty gnateater's breeding phenology. Specimens collected during June, July, and November in Bolivia were in breeding condition. In Peru, fledglings were observed in November.

=== Vocalization ===
The slaty gnateater's song is a "frog-like...'g-reep' or 'w-reeep'" . Its most common call is a "tseet" .

== Status ==
The IUCN has assessed the slaty gnateater as being of Least Concern. It is generally common but locally uncommon and occurs in several protected areas. It might benefit from logging and road construction that provide edges for dense new growth.
