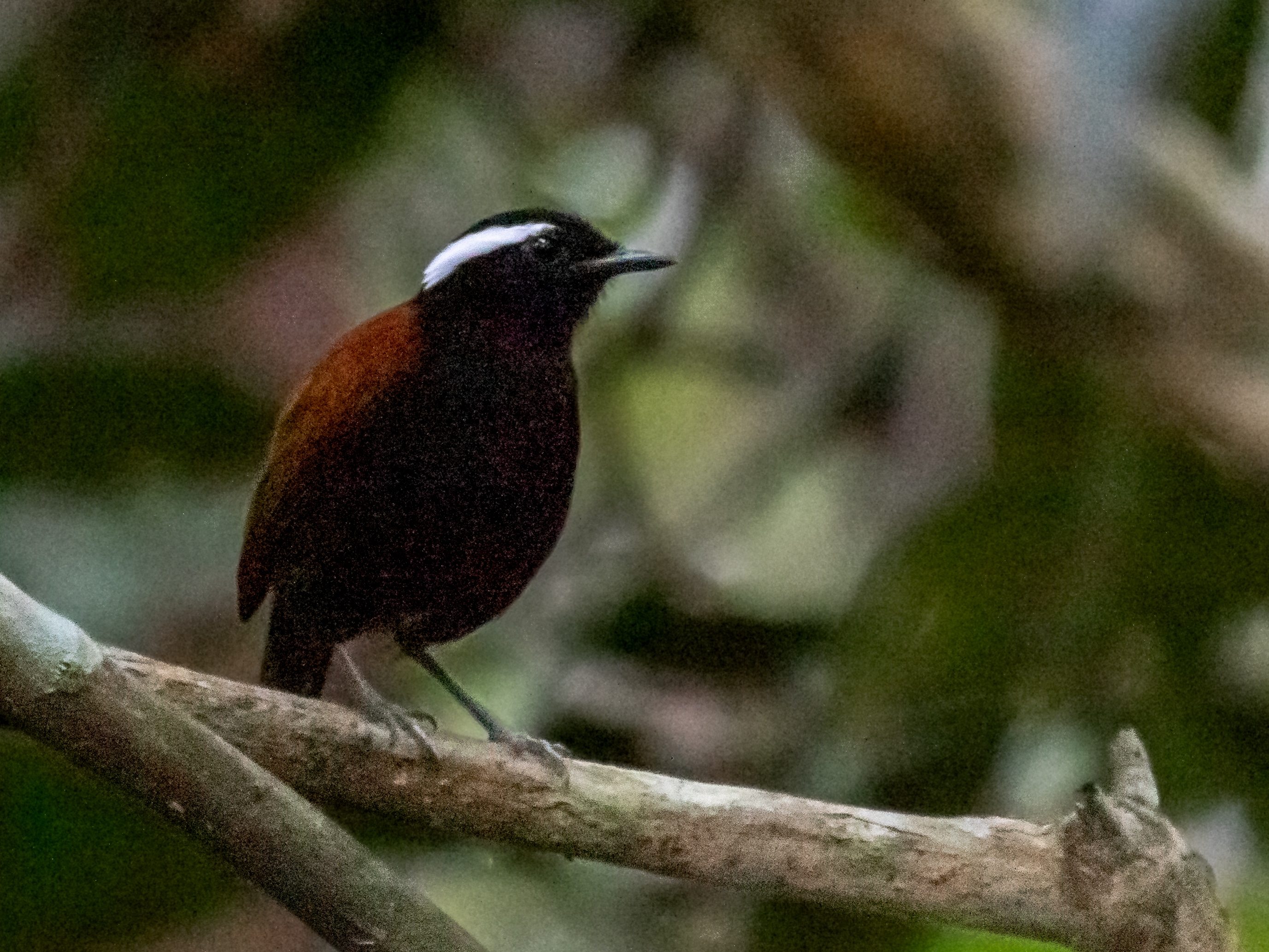

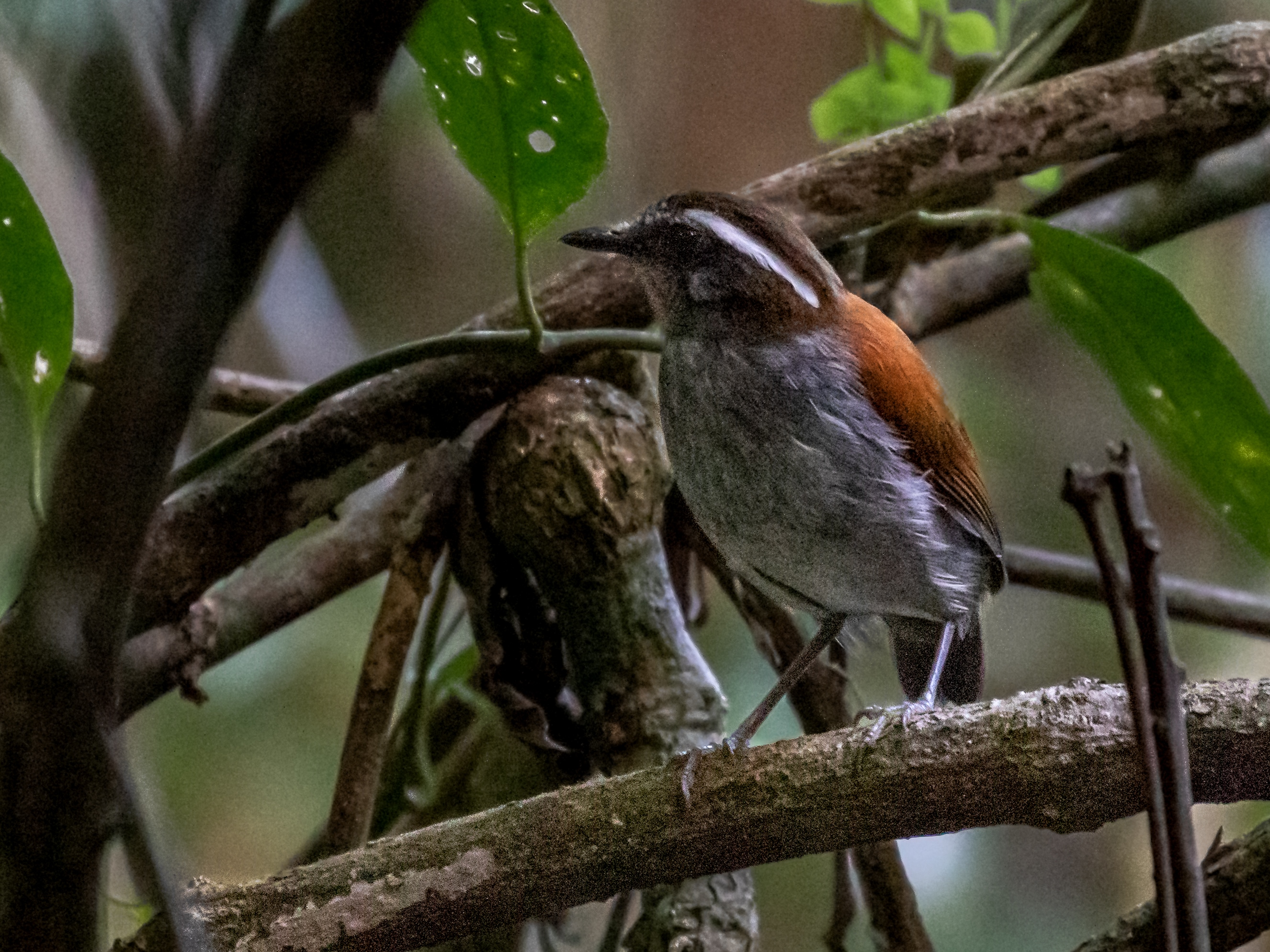

Conservation status
- Least Concern (IUCN 3.1)

Scientific classification
- Kingdom: Animalia
- Phylum: Chordata
- Class: Aves
- Order: Passeriformes
- Family: Conopophagidae
- Genus: Conopophaga
- Species: C. melanogaster

Binomial name
- Conopophaga melanogaster Ménétries, 1835

= Black-bellied gnateater =

Species of bird

The black-bellied gnateater (Conopophaga melanogaster) is a species of bird in the family Conopophagidae. It is endemic to Brazil.

== Taxonomy and systematics ==
The position of the black-bellied gnateater in linear format is unsettled. The International Ornithological Committee (IOC) and the Clements taxonomy place it differently within the gnateater family. The species is monotypic.

== Description ==
The black-bellied gnateater is 13 to 15.8 cm (5.1 to 6.2 in) long and weighs 37 to 43.5 g (1.31 to 1.53 oz). The male's entire head and most of the under parts are black, becoming dark gray on the lower belly and crissum (the area around the cloaca). Its upper parts are rich chestnut. It has a long white tuft behind the eye. The female's face and most of the under parts are gray. It also has chestnut upper parts, including the neck and crown, but those areas are browner. It has a white throat and a much smaller white tuft behind the eye.

== Distribution and habitat ==
The black-bellied gnateater is endemic to Brazil. (A single 1889 specimen from Bolivia has been attributed to this species, but it was described as a different one. No other occurrences of black-bellied gnateater in Bolivia have been reported.) Its range includes two disjunct areas within the south-central Amazon Basin. One population occurs south of the Amazon from the eastern bank of the northeast flowing Madeira River east to the lower Tapajós River and south to the northern parts of Rondônia and Mato Grosso states. The other population also occurs south of the Amazon, between the Xingu River and the lower Tocantins River.

The black-bellied gnateater inhabits thick vegetation in terra firme forest. It prefers vine tangles, second-growth palms and bamboo, and appears to favor streamcourses.

== Behavior ==
The black-bellied gnateater's diet is arthropods but the details have not been documented. Its breeding phenology has not been described. Its song is a "series of up to 5 short, dry, rattles" . Its call notes are "low grunts, barks, or short rattles" .

== Status ==
The IUCN has assessed the black-bellied gnateater as being of Least Concern. "[A] recent analysis by Bird et al. (2012) suggests that habitat within the range of Black-bellied Gnateater is not under enough immediate threat to upgrade the species to one of conservation concern."
