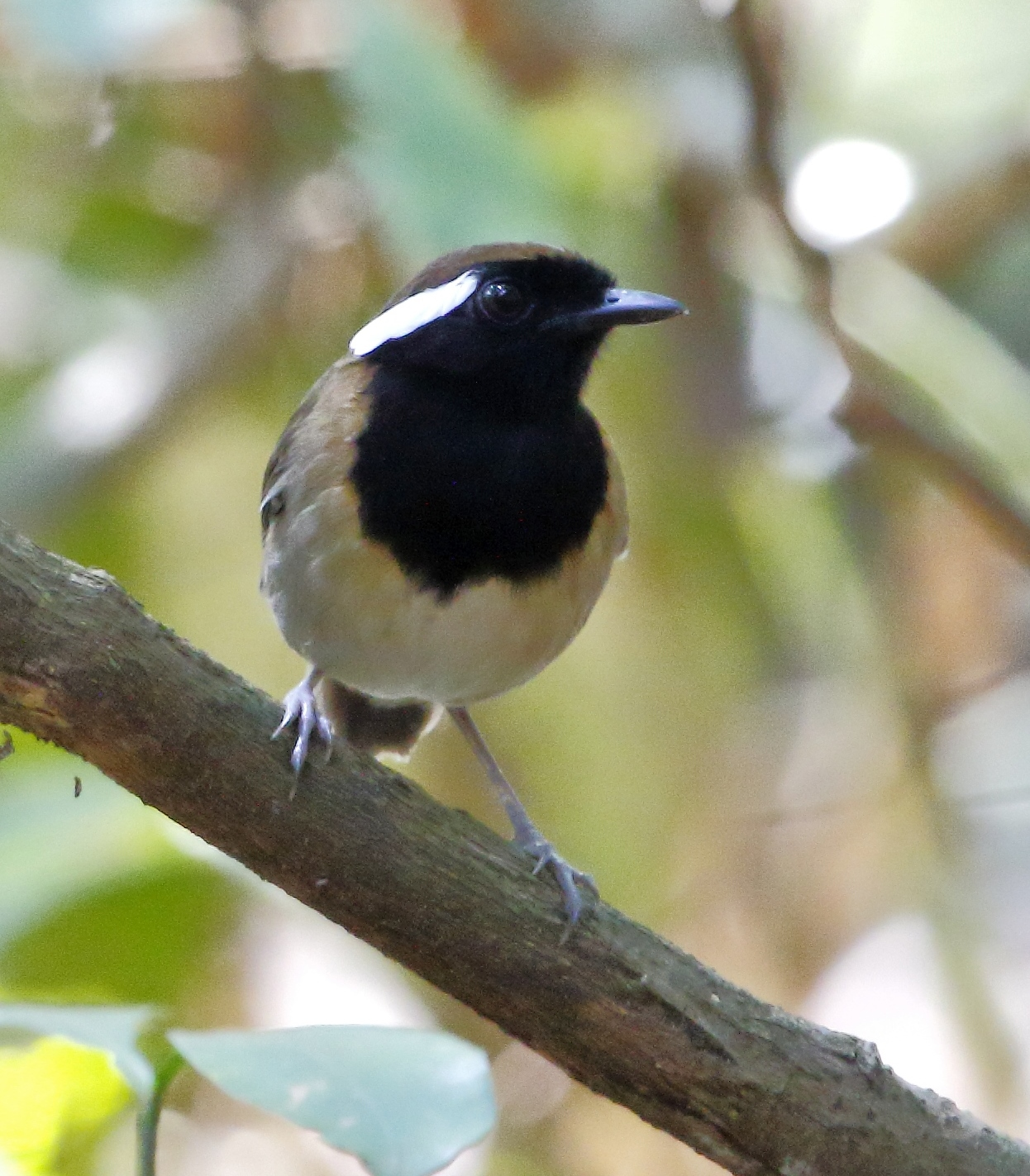

Conservation status
- Least Concern (IUCN 3.1)

Scientific classification
- Kingdom: Animalia
- Phylum: Chordata
- Class: Aves
- Order: Passeriformes
- Family: Conopophagidae
- Genus: Conopophaga
- Species: C. snethlageae

Binomial name
- Conopophaga snethlageae Berlepsch, 1912

= Black-breasted gnateater =

Species of bird

The black-breasted gnateater (Conopophaga snethlageae) is a species of bird in the family Conopophagidae. It is found in Amazonian Brazil.

== Taxonomy ==
Two subspecies are recognised:

- C. s. snethlageae von Berlepsch, 1912 - central Brazil.
- C. s. pallida Snethlage, E, 1914 - southeast Amazonian Brazil

== Status ==
The IUCN has assessed the ash-throated gnateater as being of Least Concern.
