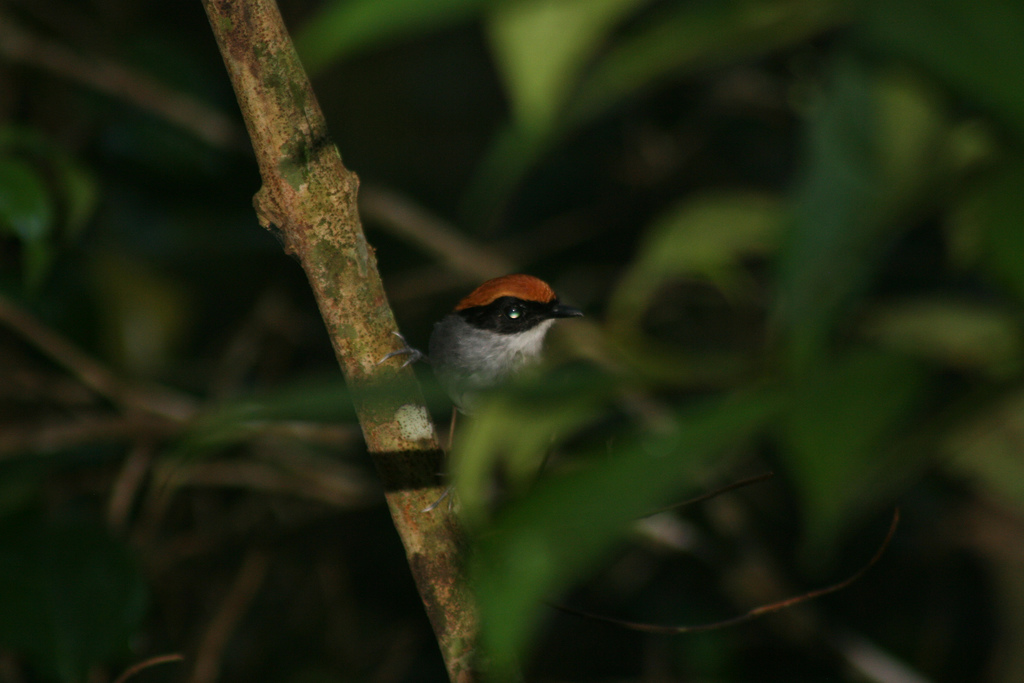
- Black-cheeked gnateater (Conopophaga melanops)

Scientific classification
- Kingdom: Animalia
- Phylum: Chordata
- Class: Aves
- Order: Passeriformes
- Family: Conopophagidae
- Genus: Conopophaga; Vieillot, 1816

Type species
- Turdus auritus Gmelin, JF, 1789

Species
- See text

= Conopophaga =

Genus of birds

Conopophaga is a genus of birds in the gnateater family. Its members are found in forest and woodland in South America.

== Taxonomy and species list ==
The genus Conopophaga was introduced in 1816 by the French ornithologist Louis Pierre Vieillot. The name combines the Ancient Greek kōnōps meaning "gnat" with -phagos meaning "-eating". The type species was subsequently designated as the chestnut-belted gnateater by George Robert Gray in 1840. The genus now contains ten species, all with "gnateater" in their common names.

Image	Scientific name	Common name	Distribution
	Rufous gnateater	Conopophaga lineata	eastern Brazil from Rio Grande do Sul north to central Brazil
	Chestnut-belted gnateater	Conopophaga aurita	Amazonia and the Guianas
	Black-breasted gnateater	Conopophaga snethlageae	Amazonian Brazil.
	Hooded gnateater	Conopophaga roberti	northern Brazil
	Ash-throated gnateater	Conopophaga peruviana	western Amazon Basin of Brazil, Peru and Ecuador
	Ceará gnateater	Conopophaga cearae	Brazilian states: Ceará, Pernambuco, Paraíba, Rio Grande Do Norte, and Alagoas
	Slaty gnateater	Conopophaga ardesiaca	Yungas of Bolivia and eastern Peru
	Chestnut-crowned gnateater	Conopophaga castaneiceps	Colombia, Ecuador, and Peru
	Black-cheeked gnateater	Conopophaga melanops	Brazil
	Black-bellied gnateater	Conopophaga melanogaster	Amazon Basin of Brazil and northern Bolivia

== Distribution and habitat ==
Gnateaters are birds found in the undergrowth of forest, woodland, and bamboo stands, with most species in the Amazon Basin, the Atlantic Forest, and the East Andean slopes. All are associated with dense thickets. While they are always found near the ground, seldom rising more than 1.5 m up, they also seldom travel or spend much time on the ground itself (though they do feed there; see diet).

They are round, short-tailed, and long-legged birds, about 12–16 cm (4.5–6.5 in) in length. They are quite upright when standing. They are sexually dimorphic, with various shades of brown, rufous, olive, white, grey and black being the dominating colours. Most Conopophaga species have a white tuft behind the eye.

== Food and feeding ==
Gnateaters are insectivorous as the group name implies. They feed mostly using two methods; one is to perch above the forest floor until prey is spotted, then lunge down to the ground to snatch it; having landed on the ground to snatch a prey item, it will not remain on the forest floor for more than a couple of seconds. The second method used by gnateaters is to glean insects directly from the foliage, trunks, and branches of low vegetation. Typical prey items include spiders, caterpillars, insect larvae, grasshoppers and beetles; individuals of some species have also been observed eating fruit, and in one case a frog.
