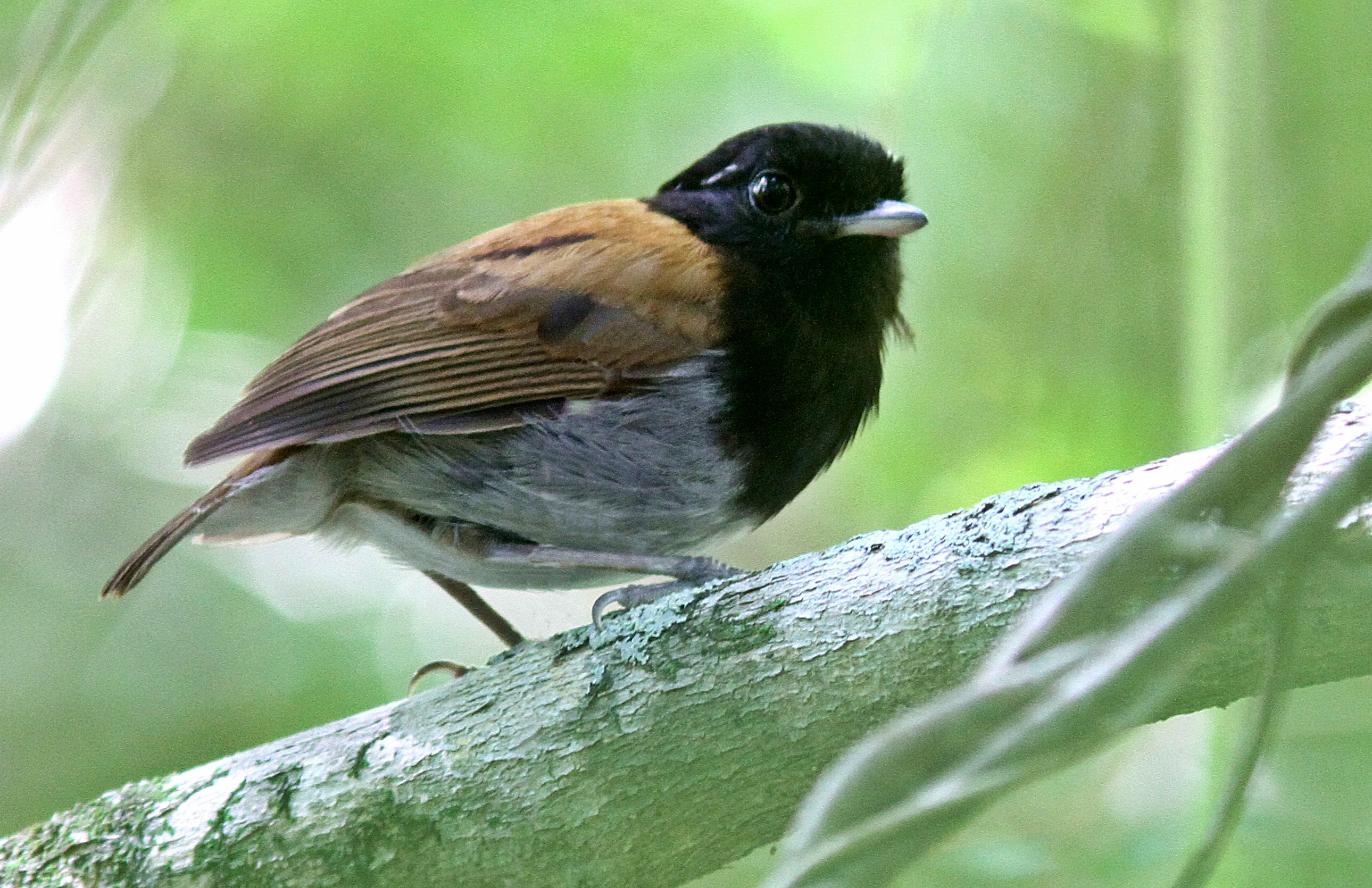

Conservation status
- Least Concern (IUCN 3.1)

Scientific classification
- Kingdom: Animalia
- Phylum: Chordata
- Class: Aves
- Order: Passeriformes
- Family: Conopophagidae
- Genus: Conopophaga
- Species: C. roberti

Binomial name
- Conopophaga roberti Hellmayr, 1905

= Hooded gnateater =

Species of bird in Brazil

The hooded gnateater (Conopophaga roberti) is a species of bird in the family Conopophagidae. It is endemic to northern Brazil.

== Taxonomy and systematics ==
The hooded gnateater is monotypic.

== Description ==
The hooded gnateater is 11 to 14 cm (4.3 to 5.5 in) long. Seven specimens that included both sexes weighed between 20.8 and 25.0 g (0.73 and 0.88 oz). The male's head, neck, and lower breast are black except for a small white tuft behind the eye. Its upper parts are brown, the flanks are gray, and the belly is white. The female has an extensive rufous crown, brown back, and pale gray face, throat, and underside.

== Distribution and habitat ==
The hooded gnateater is found in northeastern Brazil south of the Amazon River in eastern Pará through much of Maranhão and Piauí into western Ceará. In elevation it ranges from sea level to approximately 300 m (980 ft). It inhabits primary forest and mature secondary forest, both evergreen and seasonally dry. It prefers dense vegetation.

== Behavior ==
=== Feeding ===
The hooded gnateater's diet is known to be mostly small arthropods, though it has not been described in detail.

=== Breeding ===
Information on the hooded gnateater's breeding habits is limited to descriptions of two nests and a clutch of two eggs. The nests were open cups of coarse plant fibers.

=== Vocalization ===
The hooded gnateater's song is "a rapid, slightly musical ascending series of notes". Its call is "a piercing tchief! or a hard tcheek!.

== Status ==
The IUCN has assessed the hooded gnateater to be of Least Concern, though it was originally assessed as Threatened. Some researchers have suggested that it should be rated Near Threatened.
