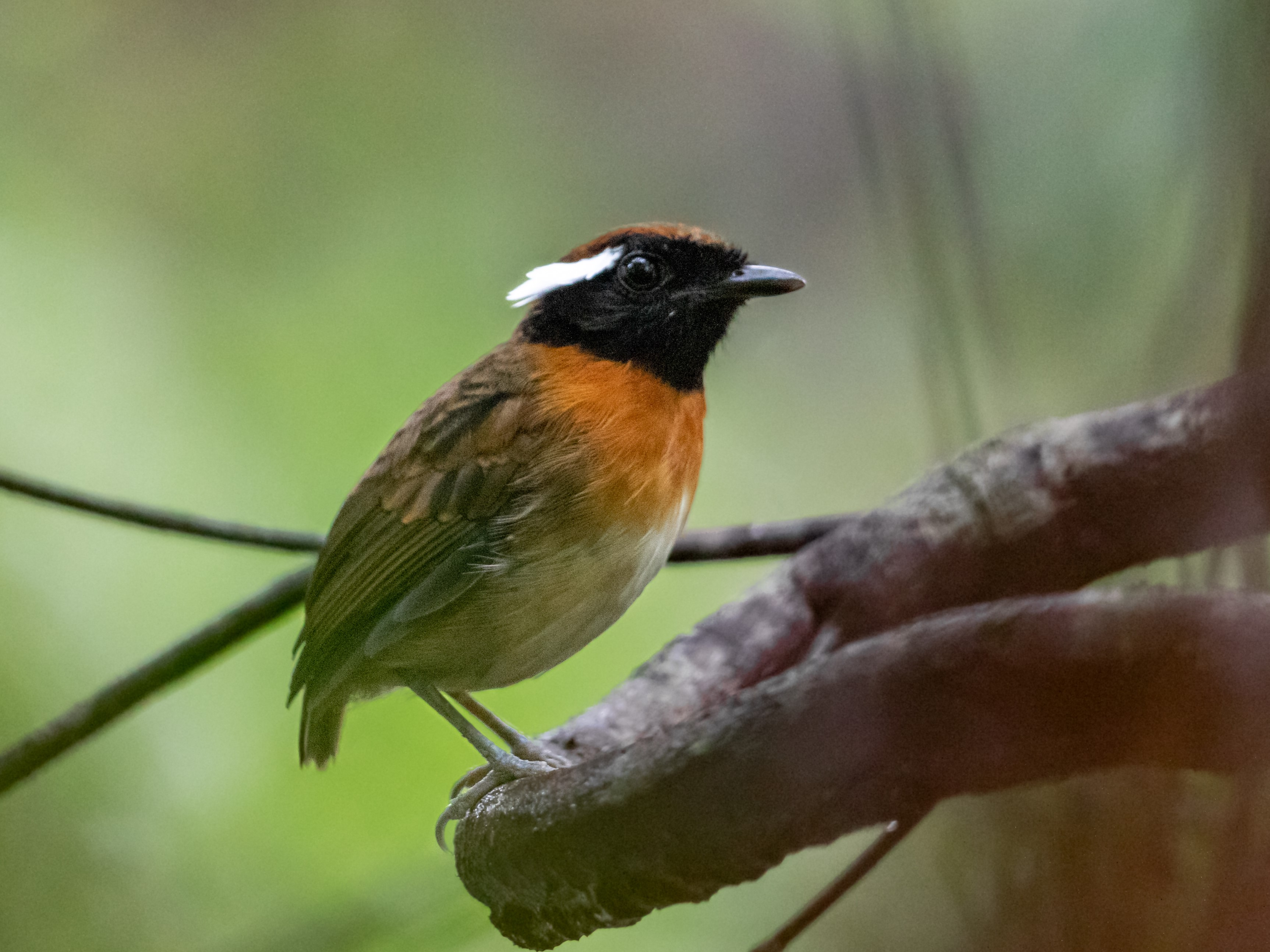
- In Novo Airão, Amazonas, Brazil

Conservation status
- Least Concern (IUCN 3.1)

Scientific classification
- Kingdom: Animalia
- Phylum: Chordata
- Class: Aves
- Order: Passeriformes
- Family: Conopophagidae
- Genus: Conopophaga
- Species: C. aurita

Binomial name
- Conopophaga aurita (Gmelin, JF, 1789)

Subspecies
- See text

= Chestnut-belted gnateater =

Species of bird

The chestnut-belted gnateater (Conopophaga aurita) is a species of bird in the family Conopophagidae, the gnateaters. It is found in the Amazon Basin of northern Brazil, southern Colombia and eastern Peru and Ecuador; also the Guianan countries of Guyana, Suriname and eastern French Guiana. Its natural habitat is tropical moist lowland forest.

== Taxonomy ==
The chestnut-belted gnateater was formally described in 1789 by the German naturalist Johann Friedrich Gmelin in his revised and expanded edition of Carl Linnaeus's Systema Naturae. He placed it with the thrushes in the genus Turdus and coined the binomial name Turdus auritus. Gmelin based his description on "Le fourmilier à oreilles blanches" that had been described and illustrated in 1778 by French polymath Comte de Buffon in his Histoire Naturelle des Oiseaux. Buffon had access to both male and female specimens that had been collected in Cayenne. The chestnut-belted gnateater is now placed with eight other gnateaters in the genus Conopophaga that was introduced in 1816 by the French ornithologist Louis Pierre Vieillot. It is the type species of the genus. The genus name combines the Ancient Greek kōnōps meaning "gnat" with -phagos meaning "-eating". The specific name aurita if from Latin auritus meaning "-eared" or "long eared".

Four subspecies are recognised:

- C. a. inexpectata Zimmer, JT, 1931 - Colombia and Brazil
- C. a. aurita (Gmelin, 1789) - Colombia and Brazil
- C. a. occidentalis Chubb, 1918 - the Guianas and northeast Brazil
- C. a. australis Todd, 1927 - eastern Peru and southwest Amazonian Brazil

== Description ==
It is a small dark bird with a relatively stout bill, brown upperparts and crown (the latter often tinged rufous), a white supercilium, and pinkish-grey legs. The male has a black frontlet, face and throat, a rufous chest, and buff or white belly. The female has a rufous face, throat and chest, and a buff or white belly. Males of the subspecies snethlageae and pallida are distinctive, as the black of the face and throat extends well onto the central chest, with rufous of the underparts limitied to the edge of the black chest.

== Distribution and habitat ==
The range of the chestnut-belted gnateater is throughout the Amazon Basin, centered on the Amazon River. The following range limits are: it covers the entire downstream half of the regions in the south Basin and does not extend into Bolivia. The limits in the west are eastern and northeastern Peru with parts of northeast Ecuador and southern Colombia; the limit in this area in the west and northwest is the Rio Negro and the species is not found in the north central Amazon Basin of most of Brazil's Roraima state.

The range in the northeast Basin beyond the Amazon River outlet extends through Amapá state into the Guianas to the Atlantic coast, and the central and eastern Guiana Shield to include only eastern Guyana.
