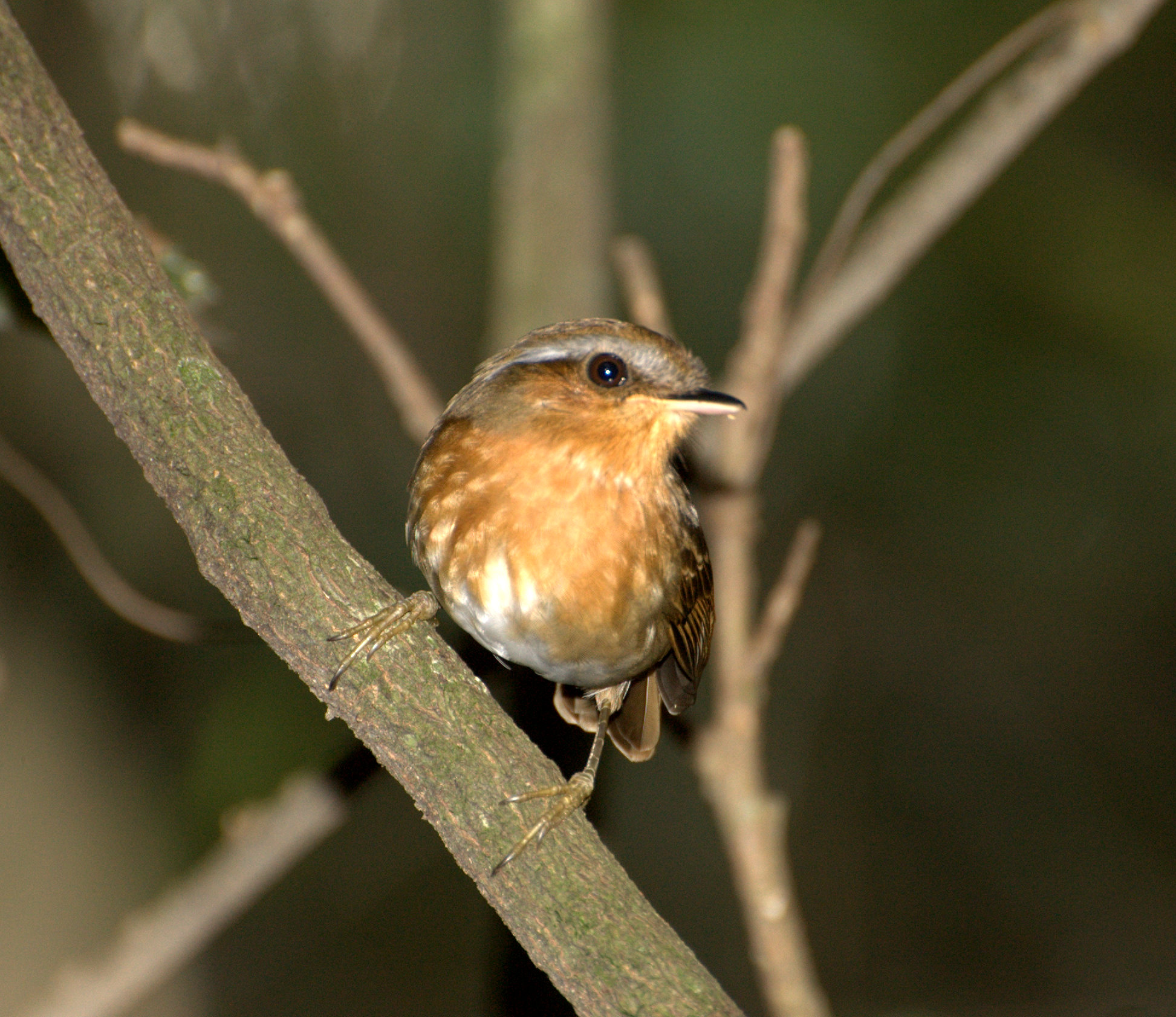

Conservation status
- Least Concern (IUCN 3.1)

Scientific classification
- Kingdom: Animalia
- Phylum: Chordata
- Class: Aves
- Order: Passeriformes
- Family: Conopophagidae
- Genus: Conopophaga
- Species: C. lineata

Binomial name
- Conopophaga lineata (Wied, 1831)

Subspecies
- See text

= Rufous gnateater =

Species of bird

The rufous gnateater (Conopophaga lineata) is a passerine bird of the gnateater family, Conopophagidae. It is found in forest understory and bushes in eastern Brazil from Rio Grande do Sul north to central Brazil. Its range also extends into eastern Paraguay and north-eastern Argentina and it has recently been recorded in Uruguay. It is often elusive and hard to see, but is commoner and less shy than other gnateaters.

== Description ==
It is a small, rounded bird, 13 cm in length with a short tail and fairly long legs. The plumage is mostly reddish brown. There is a white stripe above the eye (grey in the female) which ends in a tuft of feathers which can be hidden. The call is a series of quiet cheeps which become faster and higher-pitched. At dusk and dawn the males make a buzzing sound with their wing feathers as they fly around their territory.

The rufous gnateater feeds by moving quickly from one perch to another through undergrowth close to the ground. When it sees an insect it makes a short flight down to the ground or to overhead leaves to catch it.

The cup-shaped nest is built in a tree and made of sticks and moss. The female lays two buff-coloured eggs, oval or slightly conical in shape.

== Subspecies ==
Two subspecies are recognized:

- C. l. lineata (zu Wied-Neuwied, 1831) - Brazil
- C. l. vulgaris Ménétries, 1835 - Brazil, Paraguay, Uruguay and northeastern Argentina
