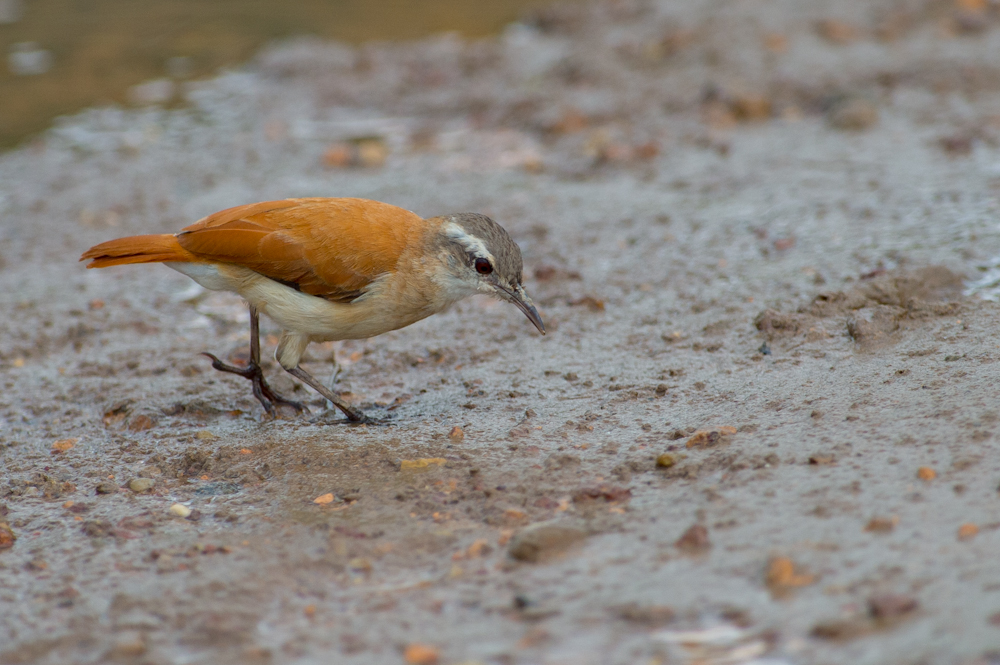

Conservation status
- Least Concern (IUCN 3.1)

Scientific classification
- Kingdom: Animalia
- Phylum: Chordata
- Class: Aves
- Order: Passeriformes
- Family: Furnariidae
- Genus: Furnarius
- Species: F. minor

Binomial name
- Furnarius minor Pelzeln, 1858

= Lesser hornero =

Species of bird

The lesser hornero (Furnarius minor) is a species of bird in the ovenbird family Furnariidae. It is closely related to the Pale-legged hornero, and their global distribution overlaps somewhat. This species is monotypic, meaning there is only one subspecies.

The lesser hornero is found in Brazil, Colombia, Ecuador, and Peru, along the banks of the Amazon River and some of its major tributaries. It is a river specialist, feeding and breeding mostly in river island scrub and early successional scrub along the edge of white-water rivers and on young river islands and, in Peru the understory of Cecropia forest. This type of successional habitat is dependent on seasonal flooding and is patchily distributed along the length of its range. It is found from 50 to 200 m (160–660 ft) above sea-level.

The lesser hornero is a very small ovenbird, 12 to 13 cm (4.7–5.1 in) in length and weighing 23 to 29 g (0.81–1.02 oz). The head is grey with a prominent white stripe above the eye, a white throat, a rufous rump and wings, tawny-buff breast and flanks becoming paler below. The bill is long and straight. Both sexes are alike, and the plumage of juvenile birds has not been described.

The lesser hornero feeds on arthropods and other invertebrates. It hunts individually or in pairs, searching the ground, river-shore mud or low branches for prey, often foraging in dense cover. Like other species in its genus, it constructs a mud "oven" nest in the branches of trees, and lines the nest with grasses and hair. The clutch size is four eggs. Little else is known about its nesting habits, other than it has been recorded building its nests in November and incubating in January.
