= Hornero =

- Rufous hornero building a nest in Minas Gerais, Brazil

Scientific classification
- Kingdom: Animalia
- Phylum: Chordata
- Class: Aves
- Order: Passeriformes
- Family: Furnariidae
- Genus: Furnarius; Vieillot, 1816

Type species
- Merops rufus Gmelin, 1788

Species
- See text

Genus of birds

The hornero birds are members of the genus Furnarius in the family Furnariidae, native to South America. The English common name appears in many books as "ovenbird".

Horneros are brown birds with rather short tails and fairly long bills. They are known for building mud nests that resemble old wood-fired ovens (the Spanish word "hornero" comes from horno, meaning "oven"). These nests have a unique chambered construction. While many Furnariids have different nests, the hornero nest is the reason for the common name applied to the entire family; ovenbirds (they are unrelated to the parulid warbler called the ovenbird in the United States). The size and exact shape of the hornero nest varies depending on the species. They generally lay two to four eggs, although the breeding behavior of the bay hornero is virtually unknown.

Adult horneros can frequently be seen sitting on top of their nest. Except for the uncommon and relatively shy bay hornero, horneros are typically fairly common and highly conspicuous birds. They are generally noisy. All horneros are partially terrestrial, and commonly seen walking on the ground with a relatively upright posture.

== Taxonomy ==
The genus Furnarius was introduced in 1816 by the French ornithologist Louis Pierre Vieillot to accommodate a single species, the rufous hornero, which therefore becomes the type species. The genus name is from Latin furnarius meaning "baker" (from furnus meaning "oven").

The genus contains eight species:

Image	Scientific name	Common Name	Distribution
	Furnarius figullus	Band-tailed hornero	Brazil
	Furnarius cinnamomeus	Pacific hornero	western Ecuador and northwestern Peru
	Furnarius longirostris	Caribbean hornero	northern Colombia and Venezuela
	Furnarius leucopus	Pale-legged hornero	northern South America
	Furnarius torridus	Bay hornero	upper Amazon and rios Huallaga, Ucayali, and Napo
	Furnarius minor	Lesser hornero	Amazon river and lower Napo, Huallaga, Madeira, Tapajós, Ji-Paraná
	Furnarius rufus	Rufous hornero	eastern South America
	Furnarius cristatus	Crested hornero	Gran Chaco

== Image gallery ==
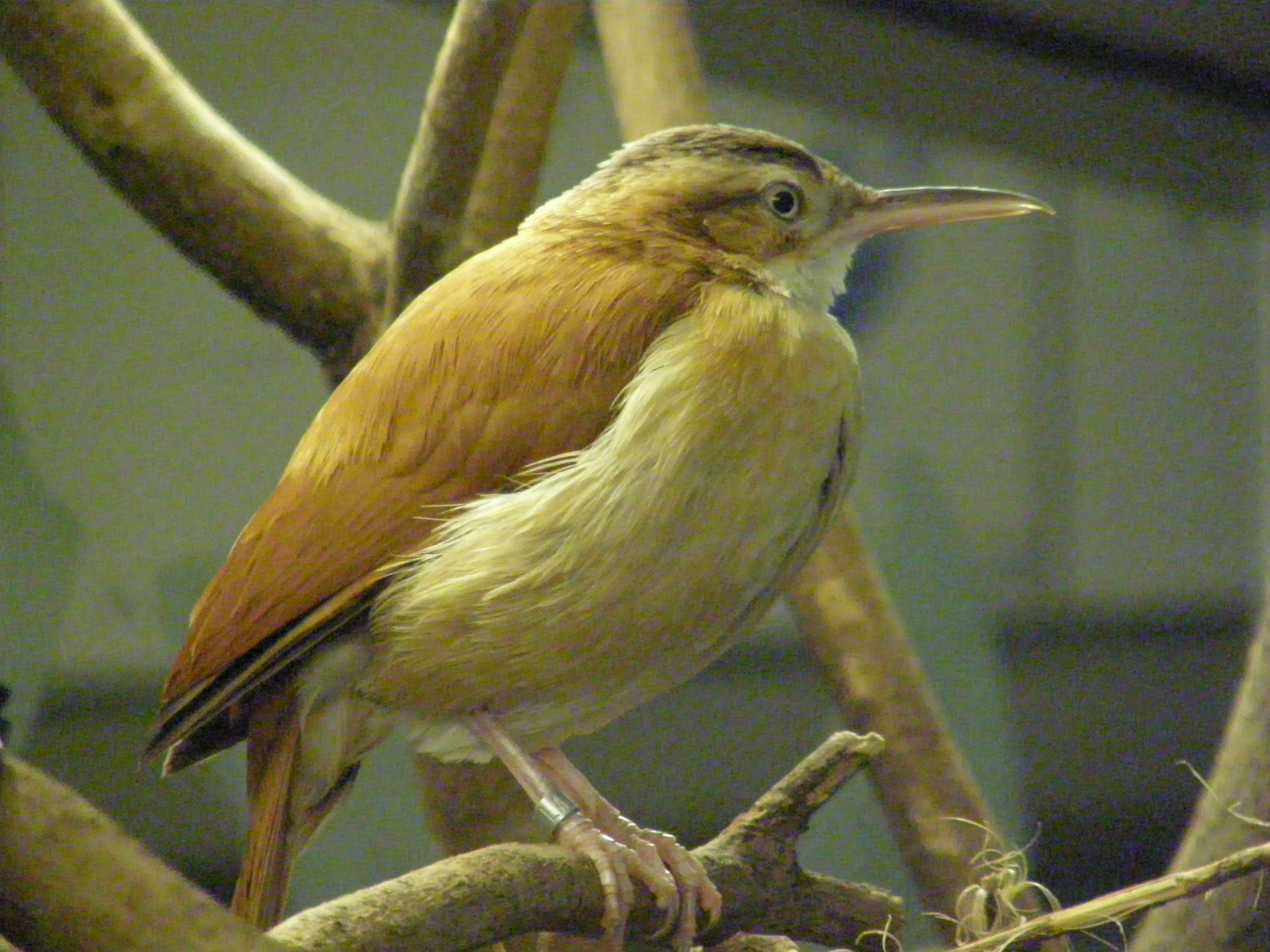
Pacific hornero

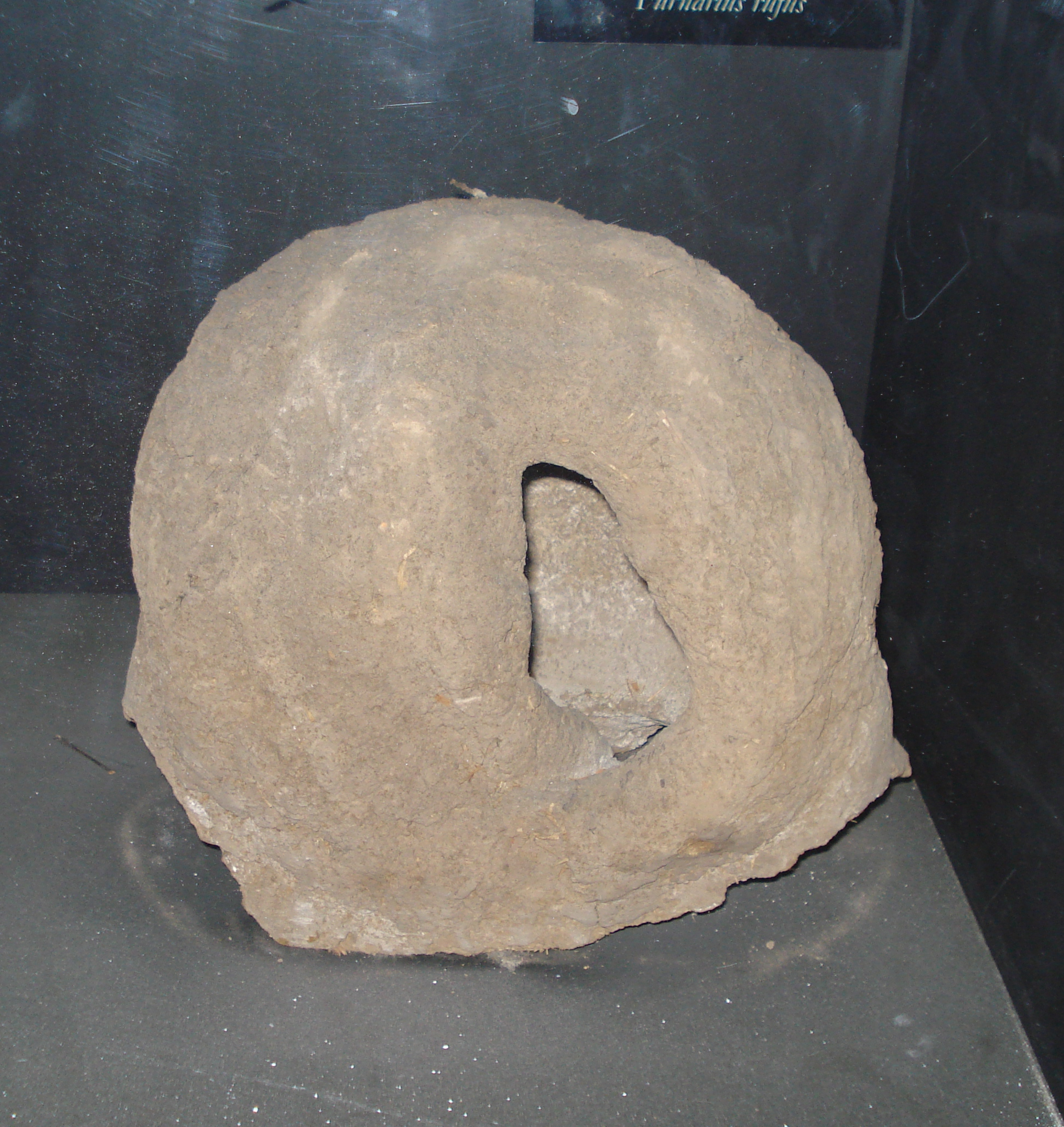
Hornero nest
