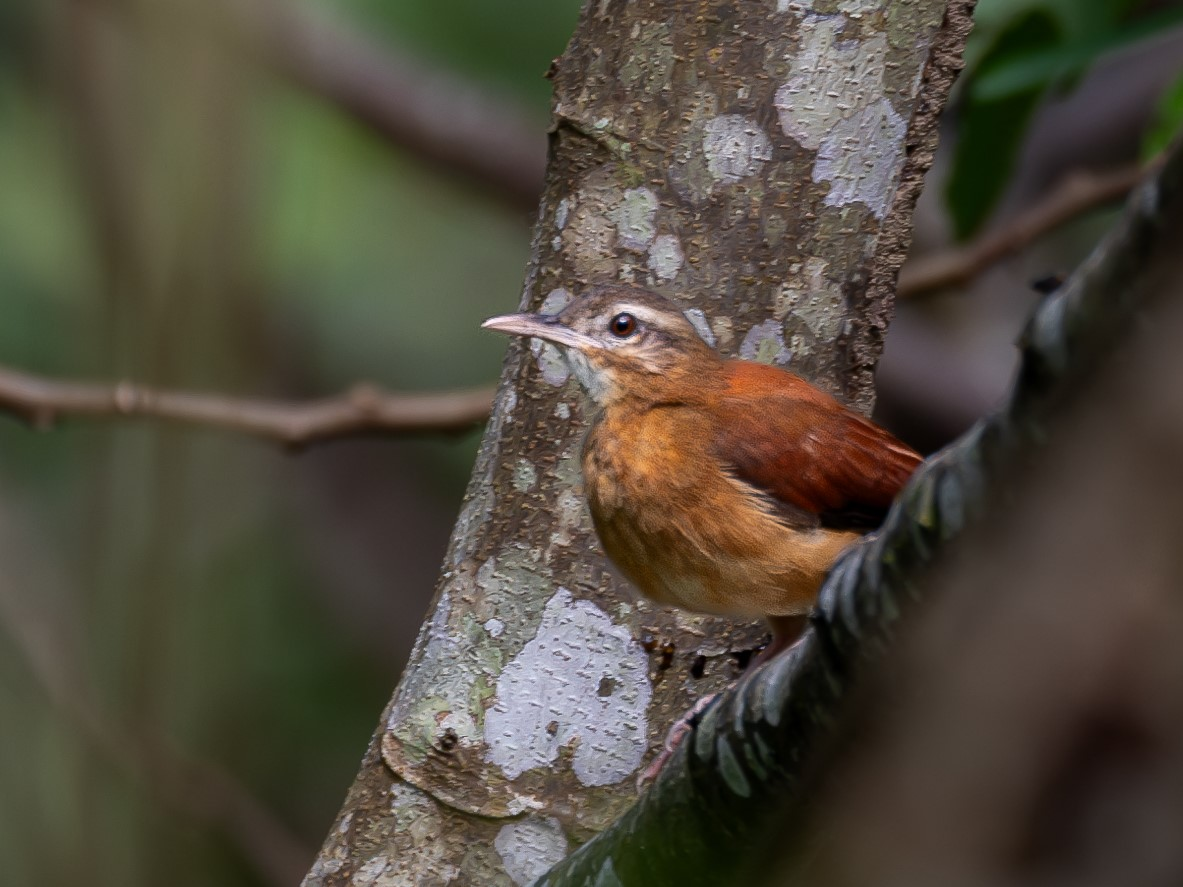

Conservation status
- Least Concern (IUCN 3.1)

Scientific classification
- Kingdom: Animalia
- Phylum: Chordata
- Class: Aves
- Order: Passeriformes
- Family: Furnariidae
- Genus: Furnarius
- Species: F. torridus

Binomial name
- Furnarius torridus Sclater, PL & Salvin, 1866

= Bay hornero =

Species of bird

The bay hornero or pale-billed hornero (Furnarius torridus) is a species of bird in the Furnariinae subfamily of the ovenbird family Furnariidae. It is found in Brazil, Colombia, Peru, and possibly Ecuador.

== Taxonomy and systematics ==
The bay hornero was originally described as a species but some early 20th century authors treated it as a subspecies of the pale-legged hornero (F. leucopus). Since the 1930s most taxonomists have again treated it as a species and early 2010s genetic data confirmed that treatment. However, even as late as 1973 one author considered it a color morph of the pale-legged.

The bay hornero is monotypic.

== Description ==
The bay hornero is 16 to 19 cm (6.3 to 7.5 in) long and weighs about 53 g (1.9 oz). It is a stout hornero with a long and nearly straight bill. The sexes' plumages are alike. Adults have a dull buffy white supercilium. Their crown and nape are grayish brown. Their back, rump, uppertail and wing coverts, and tail are chestnut brown ("bay"). Most of their wing is also chestnut brown, with a small area of pale rufous on the inner primaries. Their throat is white with dark tawny brown sides. Their breast is dark tawny brown, their flanks buffy brown, their belly whitish, and their undertail coverts dusky with chestnut brown tips. Their iris is brown or reddish brown, their maxilla light horn brown with a darker base and culmen, their mandible whitish, cream, or pinkish gray, and their legs and feet cream or very light pink.

== Distribution and habitat ==
The bay hornero is found in the western Amazon Basin along the rios Huallaga, Ucayali, and Napo in Peru, and through extreme southern Colombia and western Brazil along the upper Amazon (rio Solimões). A sight record in Ecuador leads the South American Classification Committee of the American Ornithological Society to call it hypothetical in that country.

The bay hornero primarily inhabits middle-aged river islands that undergo annual flooding, typically in stands of Cecropia. It also occurs on older islands and in várzea forest along the rivers. In Colombia most of the few records are grassy islands.

== Behavior ==
=== Movement ===
The bay hornero is a year-round resident throughout its range.

=== Feeding ===
The bay hornero's diet and foraging behavior are poorly known. It forages on the ground, usually in pairs, and usually under vegetation overhangs. It is assumed to feed on arthropods and other terrestrial vertebrates.

=== Breeding ===
The bay hornero's nest is typical of its genus, "a mud dome with a side entrance" on a horizontal tree limb. Nothing else is known about its breeding biology.

=== Vocalization ===
The bay hornero's song is "a long, descending, staccato series rather like that of Pale-legged [Hornero], but with a distinctive closely spaced, ascending terminal component". It has also been described as a "descending, hurried series of loud, fluted notes, ending in a tremolo". Its calls include "an explosive keek or tseek".

== Status ==
The IUCN has assessed the bay hornero as being of Least Concern. It has a fairly large range and a population of unknown size that is believed to be decreasing. No immediate threats have been identified. It is considered "uncommon to fairly common" in Peru.
