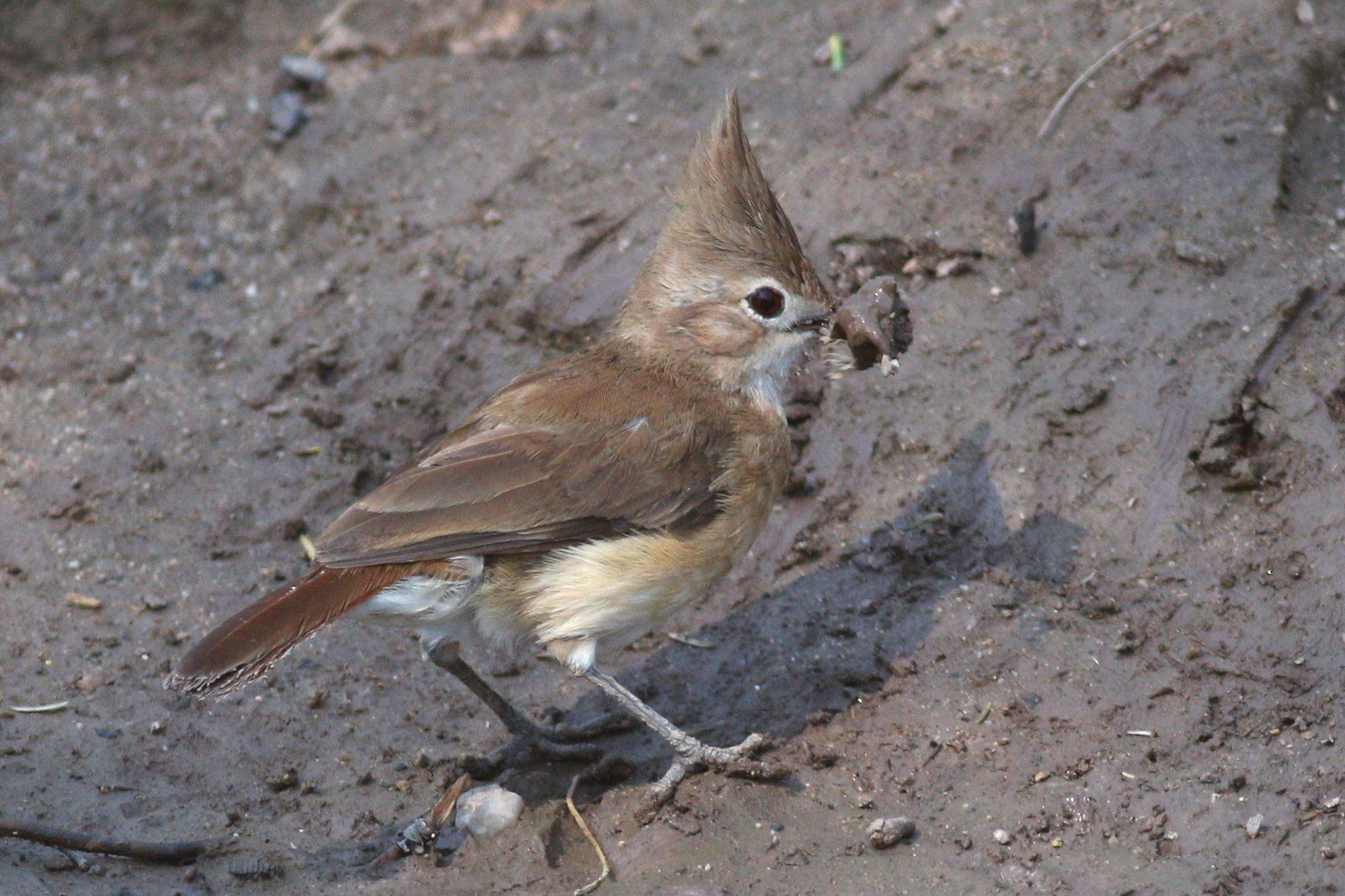

Conservation status
- Least Concern (IUCN 3.1)

Scientific classification
- Kingdom: Animalia
- Phylum: Chordata
- Class: Aves
- Order: Passeriformes
- Family: Furnariidae
- Genus: Furnarius
- Species: F. cristatus

Binomial name
- Furnarius cristatus Burmeister, 1888

= Crested hornero =

Species of bird

The crested hornero (Furnarius cristatus) is a species of bird in the Furnariinae subfamily of the ovenbird family Furnariidae. It is found in Argentina, Bolivia, and Paraguay.

== Taxonomy and systematics ==
The crested hornero is most closely related to the rufous hornero (F. rufus), and they may be sister species. The crested hornero is monotypic.

== Description ==
The crested hornero is 14 to 15 cm (5.5 to 5.9 in) long and weighs 26 to 29 g (0.92 to 1.0 oz). It is a small hornero with the shortest bill of its genus. Its most distinctive feature is its crest, which is also unique among horneros. The sexes' plumages are alike. Adults have a faint pale supercilium and dull brownish malar area and ear coverts; the last have indistinct darker edges. Their forehead is rufescent and their crown and its crest duller clay-brown. Their back and rump are dull tawny-rufous and their uppertail coverts are rufous. Their tail's central pair of feathers are dull rufous and the rest brighter rufous. Their wing coverts and flight feathers are mostly dull tawny-brown with rufous edges on the latter. Their throat is whitish, their breast tawny, and their belly and flanks a deeper tawny with a whitish center to the belly. Their undertail coverts are tawny whitish with rufescent-brown bases. Their iris is brownish-red, their maxilla blackish, their mandible pinkish with a dark tip, and their legs and feet gray.

== Distribution ==
The crested hornero is found from extreme southeastern Bolivia and western Paraguay south into Argentina as far as the central provinces of San Luis, Córdoba, Santa Fe, and Entre Ríos. It inhabits several arid landscapes including lowland scrublands, higher elevation Gran Chaco scrub, and woodlands. It occurs as high as 1,000 m (3,300 ft).

== Behavior ==
=== Movement ===
The crested hornero is a year-round resident throughout its range.

=== Feeding ===
The crested hornero's diet is primarily arthropods. It forages singly or in pairs while walking, gleaning its prey from the ground.

=== Breeding ===
The crested hornero breeds during the austral spring and summer. It is thought to be monogamous. Its nest is an "oven" of mud with an inner chamber lined with dry plant matter, and typically on a horizontal tree or shrub branch. The clutch size is four eggs. Nothing else is known about its breeding biology.

=== Vocalization ===
The crested hornero's song is "an explosive staccato burst of loud, piercing whistled notes tailing off towards [the] end". Its call is "jwee-t-t-t-t-t-t-t".

== Status ==
The IUCN has assessed the crested hornero as being of Least Concern. It has a fairly large range, and though its population size is not known it is believed to be stable. No immediate threats have been identified. It is considered fairly common to common and occurs in at least one protected area. It "[b]enefits from modest anthropogenic habitat modification".
