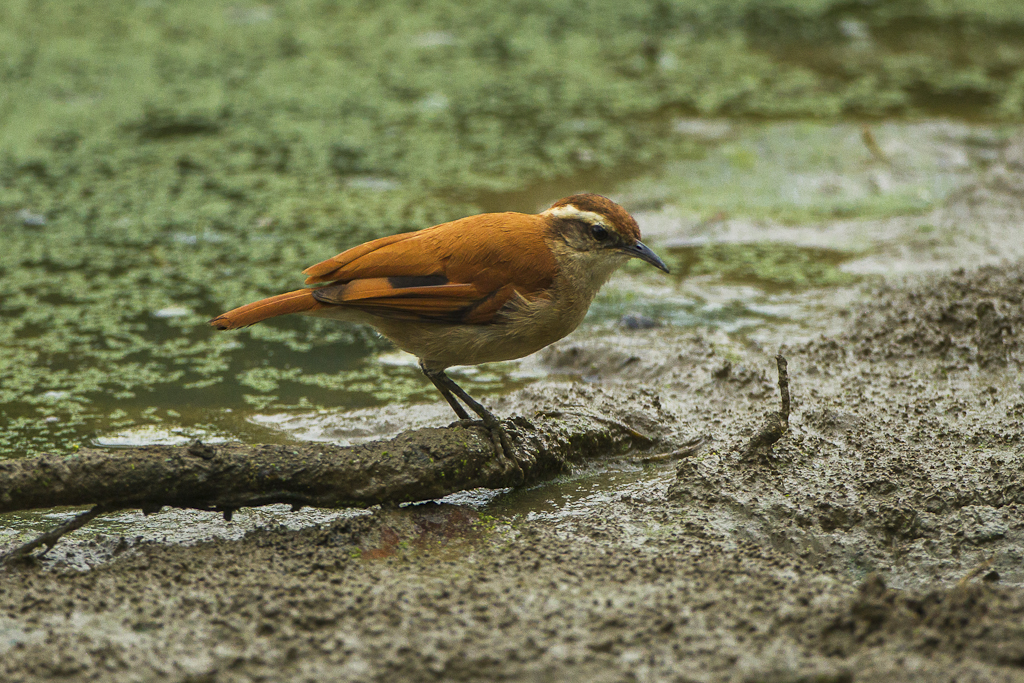

Conservation status
- Least Concern (IUCN 3.1)

Scientific classification
- Kingdom: Animalia
- Phylum: Chordata
- Class: Aves
- Order: Passeriformes
- Family: Furnariidae
- Genus: Furnarius
- Species: F. figulus

Binomial name
- Furnarius figulus (Lichtenstein, MHC, 1823)

= Band-tailed hornero =

Species of bird in Brazil

The band-tailed hornero (Furnarius figulus), also known as wing-banded hornero, is a species of bird in the Furnariinae subfamily of the ovenbird family Furnariidae. It is endemic to Brazil.

== Taxonomy and systematics ==
The band-tailed hornero has two subspecies, the nominate F. f. figulus (Lichtenstein, MHC, 1823) and F. f. pileatus (Sclater, PL & Salvin, 1878).

== Description ==
The band-tailed hornero is 15 to 16 cm (5.9 to 6.3 in) long and weighs about 28 g (0.99 oz). It is a small hornero with a long and nearly straight bill. The sexes' plumages are alike. Adults of the nominate subspecies have a wide white supercilium, dingy rufous lores, a dark stripe through the eye, dull rufous ear coverts, and a tawny buff malar area. Their crown is chestnut-rufous and their back, rump, and uppertail coverts a slightly paler chestnut-rufous. Their tail is also chestnut-rufous, with brownish black tips on the inner webs of its feathers. Their wing coverts and secondaries are rufous and their primaries fuscous with two dark rufous bands. Their throat is whitish that becomes pale tawny-brown on the rest of their underparts but for a whitish center to the belly and almost white undertail coverts. Their iris is brown, their bill brownish, and their legs and feet also brownish. Subspecies F. f. pileatus has much a darker brown crown and ear coverts and more black on the tail than the nominate.

== Distribution and habitat ==
The two subspecies of the band-tailed hornero have widely separated ranges within Brazil. F. f. pileatus is found along the Amazon River from eastern Amazonas to central Pará and south along the Araguaia and Tocantins rivers through Tocantins and eastern Mato Grosso into Goiás. F. f. figulus is found in eastern Brazil from Maranhão east to the Atlantic and south into Rio de Janeiro and São Paulo states. Its expansion into these last two states from Espírito Santo and Minas Gerais had begun by the 1980s.

The band-tailed hornero inhabits a variety of landscapes, most of which are semi-open to open. These include woodlands, scrublands in deforested areas, pastures, the edges of marshes, and urban and suburban gardens and parks. It is usually found near water, especially rivers. In most of its range it occurs below 600 m (2,000 ft) of elevation though it reaches 900 m (3,000 ft) in a few areas and has been recorded at 1,250 m (4,100 ft) in Minas Gerais.

== Behavior ==
=== Movement ===
The band-tailed hornero is a year-round resident throughout its range.

=== Feeding ===
The band-tailed hornero feeds on invertebrates including a variety of insects, other arthropods, and snails. It forages singly or in pairs while walking on the ground, turning over leaves and twigs to glean its prey.

=== Breeding ===
The band-tailed hornero's breeding season has not been defined but includes March and April. It is thought to be monogamous. It makes an open cup of grass and other plant fibers lined with feathers and hair at the base of palm leaves, in a bromeliad, or occasionally in a crevice in a building. It does not build the "oven" nest typical of other horneros but has been observed at them. The clutch size is two eggs and the incubation period appears to be about 20 days. The time to fledging and details of parental care are not known.

=== Vocalization ===
The band-tailed hornero's song is a "series of 3-20 high, very loud staccato notes 'djip-djip--' " that decelerate and descend in pitch. One call is a "harsh 'djeep-djeep--' "; others are "chibit, chep" and "kwee-eh". Pairs often sing in duet.

== Status ==
The IUCN has assessed the band-tailed hornero as being of Least Concern. It has a very large range, and though its population size is not known it is expanding. No immediate threats have been identified. Its population is thought to be small in part because of the patchy nature of its habitat, though the nominate subspecies is expanding its range. It does occur in at least two protected areas.
