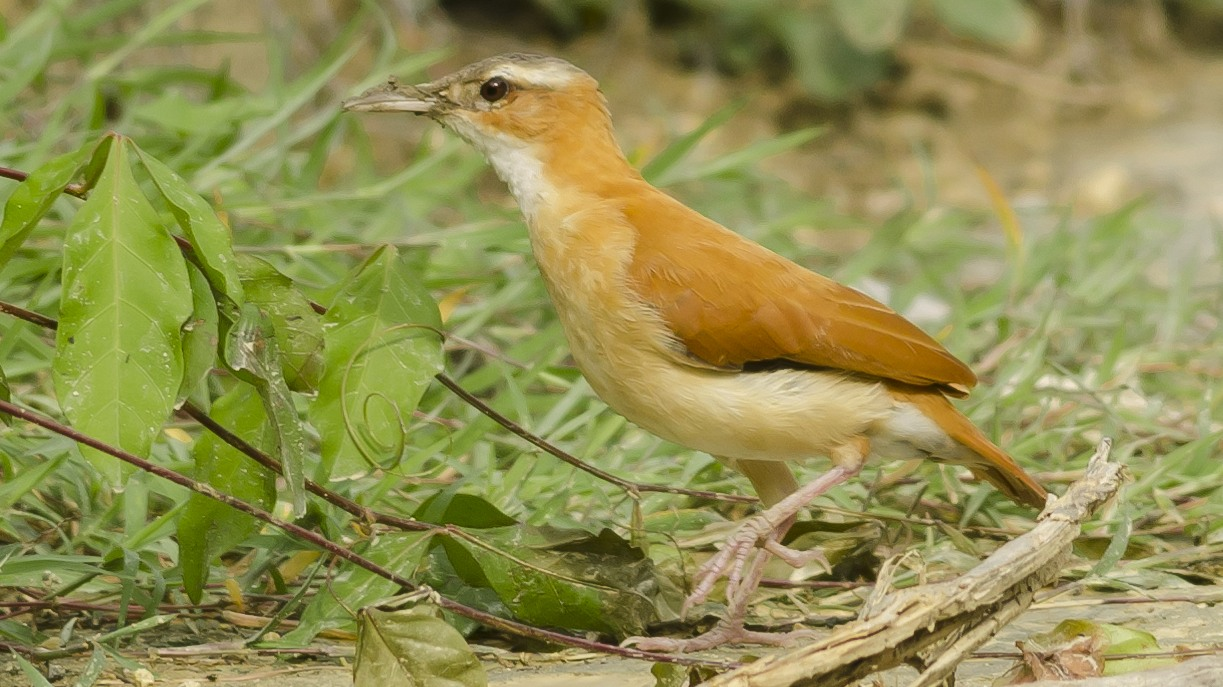

Conservation status
- Least Concern (IUCN 3.1)

Scientific classification
- Kingdom: Animalia
- Phylum: Chordata
- Class: Aves
- Order: Passeriformes
- Family: Furnariidae
- Genus: Furnarius
- Species: F. longirostris

Binomial name
- Furnarius longirostris Pelzeln, 1856

= Caribbean hornero =

Species of bird

The Caribbean hornero (Furnarius longirostris) is a species of bird in the Furnariinae subfamily of the ovenbird family Furnariidae. It is found in Colombia and Venezuela.

== Taxonomy and systematics ==
The Caribbean hornero's taxonomy is unsettled. The International Ornithological Committee (IOC), BirdLife International's Handbook of the Birds of the World (HBW), and the Clements taxonomy treat it as a species with two subspecies, the nominate F. l. longirostris (Pelzeln, 1856) and F. l. endoecus (Cory, 1919). The South American Classification Committee of the American Ornithological Society (SACC) treats it as two subspecies of the pale-legged hornero (F. leucopus). Early authors (e.g. Chapman) had treated them separately.

== Description ==
The Caribbean hornero is 17 to 19 cm (6.7 to 7.5 in) long. It is a medium-sized hornero with a long and somewhat decurved bill. The subspecies differ little and the sexes' plumages are alike. Adults have a wide white supercilium, a narrow brownish gray stripe behind the eye, tawny ear coverts, and a tawny-rufous malar area. Their crown is gray. Their back, rump, and wing and uppertail coverts are bright orange rufous. Their tail is chestnut. Their flight feathers are blackish with a rufous band. Their throat is white and the rest of their underparts rich cinnamon-buff. Their iris is dark brown, their maxilla mostly dark, their mandible pale, and their legs and feet pale pinkish.

== Distribution and habitat ==
The Caribbean hornero is found from Córdoba and Antioquia departments in northern Colombia east into northwestern Venezuela to Falcón state. It inhabits a wide variety of semi-open to open landscapes in the lowlands. These include forest and woodlands along rivers (gallery forest), the edges of secondary forest, agricultural areas, and parks and gardens in towns. It favors areas near water. In elevation it mostly occurs below 1,500 m (4,900 ft).

== Behavior ==
=== Movement ===
The Caribbean hornero is a year-round resident throughout its range.

=== Feeding ===
The Caribbean hornero's diet is mostly a variety of arthropods. It also includes other small invertebrates like snails. It forages singly or in pairs while walking on the ground, turning over leaves to glean and probe for its prey.

=== Breeding ===
The Caribbean hornero's breeding season has not been described. It appears to be prolonged, with evidence of breeding recorded in most months between January and September in Colombia. Though its nest has not been formally described, it is an "oven" of mud with an inner chamber lined with dry plant matter. Both members of a pair construct it, typically on a tree branch. The clutch size is two eggs. The incubation period, time to fledging, and details of parental care are not known.

=== Vocalization ===
The Caribbean hornero is very vocal. Its song is a shortish rattle "lasting ca. 4 seconds, accelerating and then slowing, on an even pitch, or falling slightly at the end". Every note has a sharp peak followed by a downslur.

== Status ==
The IUCN has assessed the Caribbean hornero as being of Least Concern. It has a large range, and though its population size is not known it is believed to be increasing. No immediate threats have been identified. It is considered uncommon to very common. It "[b]enefits from moderate anthropogenic habitat alteration, and has probably extended its range into deforested areas". It occurs in several protected areas.
