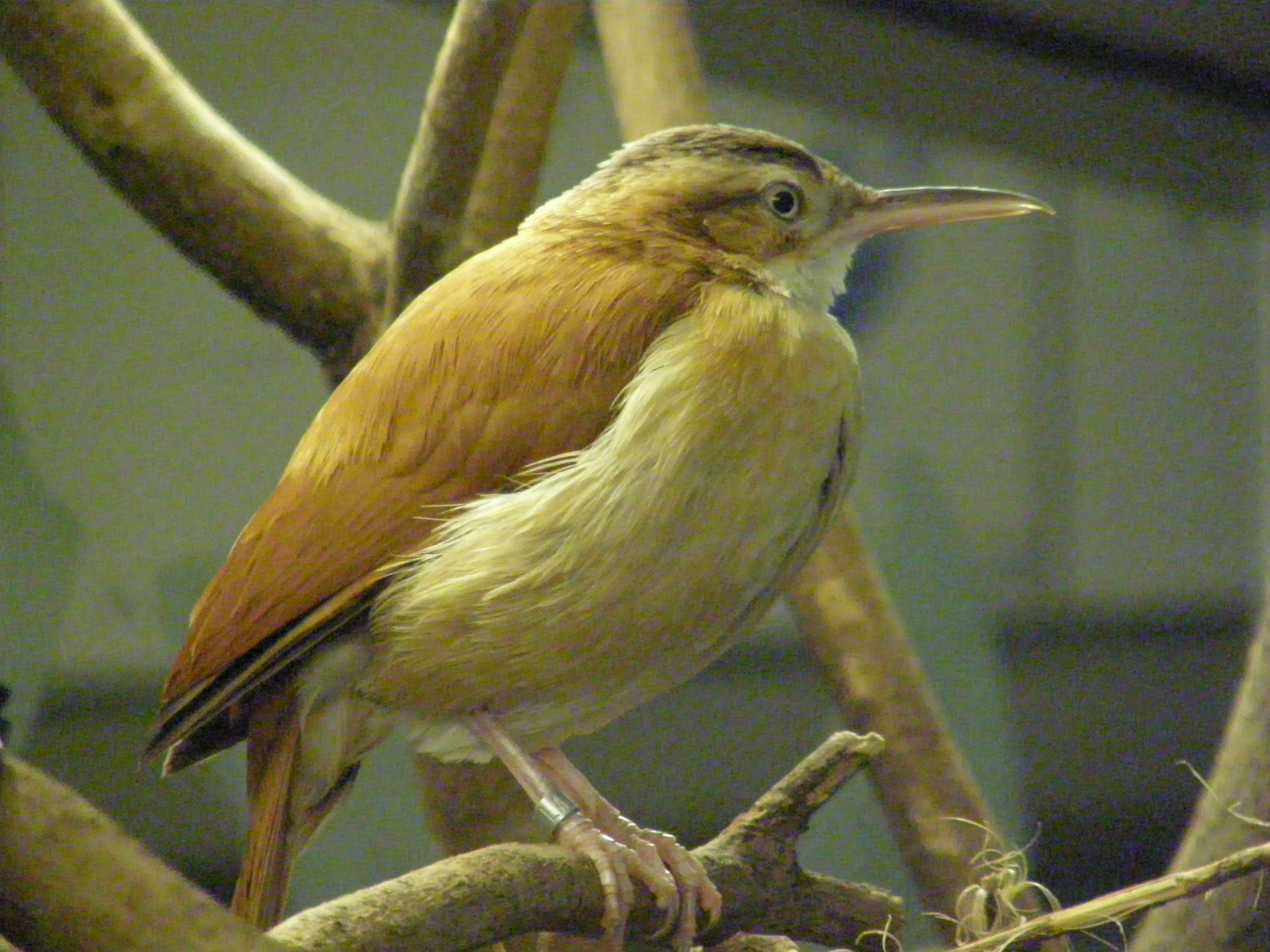

Conservation status
- Least Concern (IUCN 3.1)

Scientific classification
- Kingdom: Animalia
- Phylum: Chordata
- Class: Aves
- Order: Passeriformes
- Family: Furnariidae
- Genus: Furnarius
- Species: F. cinnamomeus

Binomial name
- Furnarius cinnamomeus (Lesson, 1844)

= Pacific hornero =

Species of bird

The Pacific hornero (Furnarius cinnamomeus) is a species of bird in the Furnariinae subfamily of the ovenbird family Furnariidae. It is found in Colombia, Ecuador, and Peru.

== Taxonomy and systematics ==
The Pacific hornero's taxonomy is unsettled. The International Ornithological Committee (IOC), BirdLife International's Handbook of the Birds of the World (HBW), and the Clements taxonomy treat it as a monotypic species. The South American Classification Committee of the American Ornithological Society (SACC) treats it as a subspecies of the pale-legged hornero (F. leucopus). Early authors (e.g. Chapman) had treated them separately. The SACC accepts that cinnamomeus may deserve species rank but declined to make the split due to "insufficient published data".

== Description ==
The Pacific hornero is 19 to 20 cm (7.5 to 7.9 in) long and weighs about 45 to 63 g (1.6 to 2.2 oz). It is a medium-sized hornero with a long and somewhat decurved bill. The sexes' plumages are alike. Adults have a wide whitish supercilium, a narrow brownish gray stripe through the eye, tawny ear coverts, and a tawny-rufous malar area. Their crown is gray-brown. Their back, rump, and wing and uppertail coverts are bright orange rufous. Their tail is chestnut. Their flight feathers are blackish with a wide rufous band. Their throat is white and the rest of their underparts pale cinnamon-buff. Their iris is yellow to whitish, their maxilla mostly dark, their mandible pale, and their legs and feet pale brownish gray.

== Distribution and habitat ==
The Pacific hornero is found from far southwestern Colombia's Nariño Department south through western Ecuador and into northwestern Peru as far as Ancash Department. It first appeared in Colombia in 2012 and is possibly expanding its range even further north.

The Pacific hornero inhabits a wide variety of semi-open to open landscapes, mostly in the lowlands. These include forest and woodlands along rivers (gallery forest), the edges of secondary forest, agricultural areas, and parks and gardens in towns. It favors areas of middling humidity, usually near water, and shuns very humid and very arid areas. In elevation it mostly occurs below 1,500 m (4,900 ft), though in Ecuador's Loja Province it reaches 2,300 m (7,500 ft) in the subtropic zone.

== Behavior ==
=== Movement ===
The Pacific hornero is a year-round resident throughout its range.

=== Feeding ===
The Pacific hornero's diet is mostly a variety of arthropods. It also includes other small invertebrates like snails and there are records of the species catching small fish in shallow pools near the end of the dry season. It forages singly or in pairs while walking on the ground, turning over leaves to glean and probe for its prey.

=== Breeding ===
The Pacific hornero's breeding season appears to include at least January to April. Though its nest has not been formally described, it is an "oven" of mud with an inner chamber lined with dry plant matter. Both members of a pair construct it, typically on a tree branch but also on horizontal structures like the crossbars of utility poles. The clutch size is two or three eggs. The incubation period, time to fledging, and details of parental care are not known.

=== Vocalization ===
The Pacific hornero is very vocal. Its song is "an arresting - at times almost raucous-and fast series of loud piercing notes that gradually slows and drops in pitch". Members of a pair sometimes sing in unison. One call is "a loud and clear 'kyeek' ".

== Status ==
The IUCN has assessed the Pacific hornero as being of Least Concern. It has a fairly large range, and though its population size is not known it is believed to be increasing. No immediate threats have been identified. It is considered uncommon to very common. It "[b]enefits from moderate anthropogenic habitat alteration, and...it has extended its range into deforested areas". It occurs in several protected areas.
