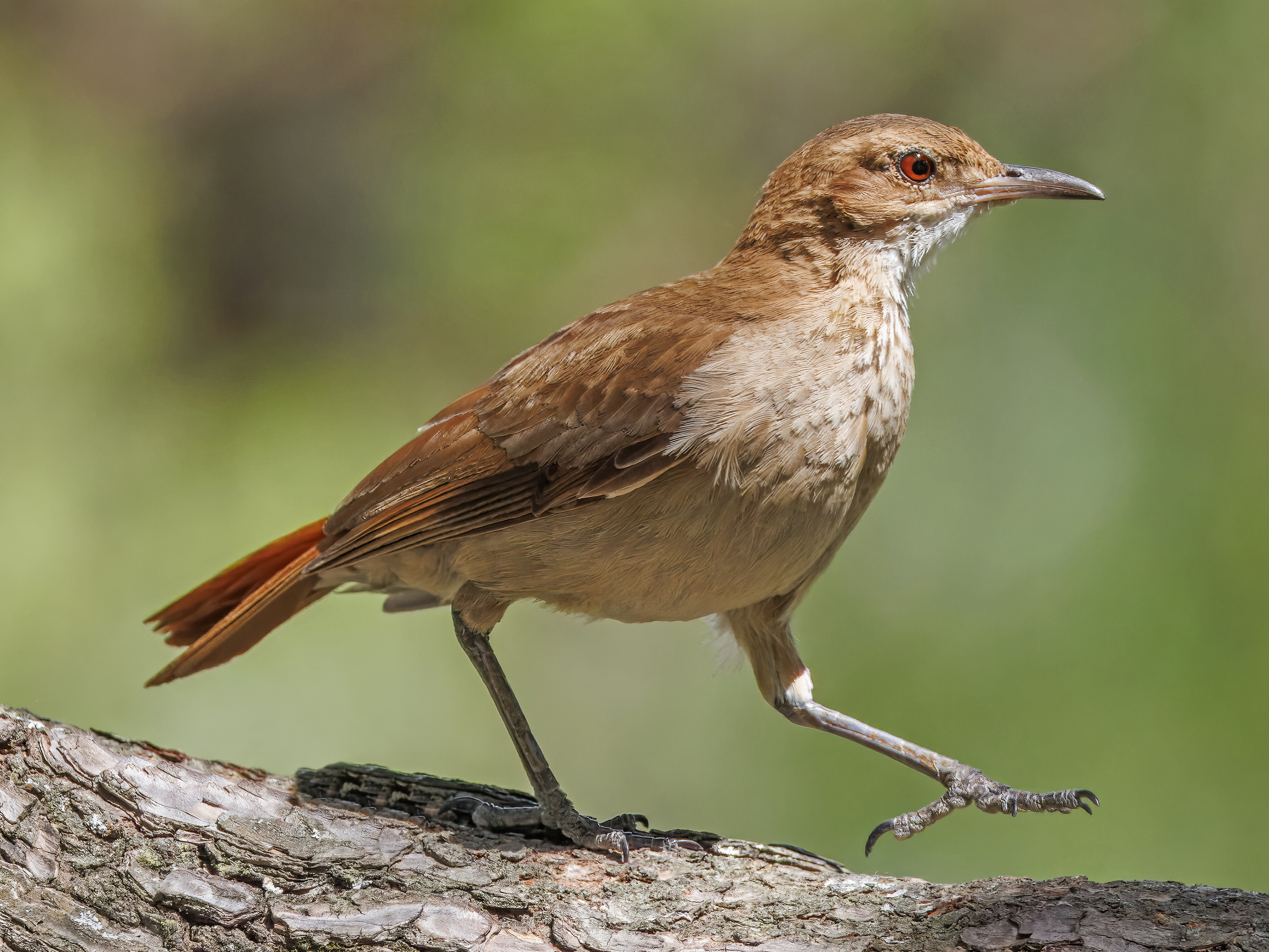
- F. r. rufus in Colonia, Uruguay
- Alarm call in José María Ezeiza, Argentina.

Conservation status
- Least Concern (IUCN 3.1)

Scientific classification
- Kingdom: Animalia
- Phylum: Chordata
- Class: Aves
- Order: Passeriformes
- Family: Furnariidae
- Genus: Furnarius
- Species: F. rufus

Binomial name
- Furnarius rufus (Gmelin, JF, 1788)
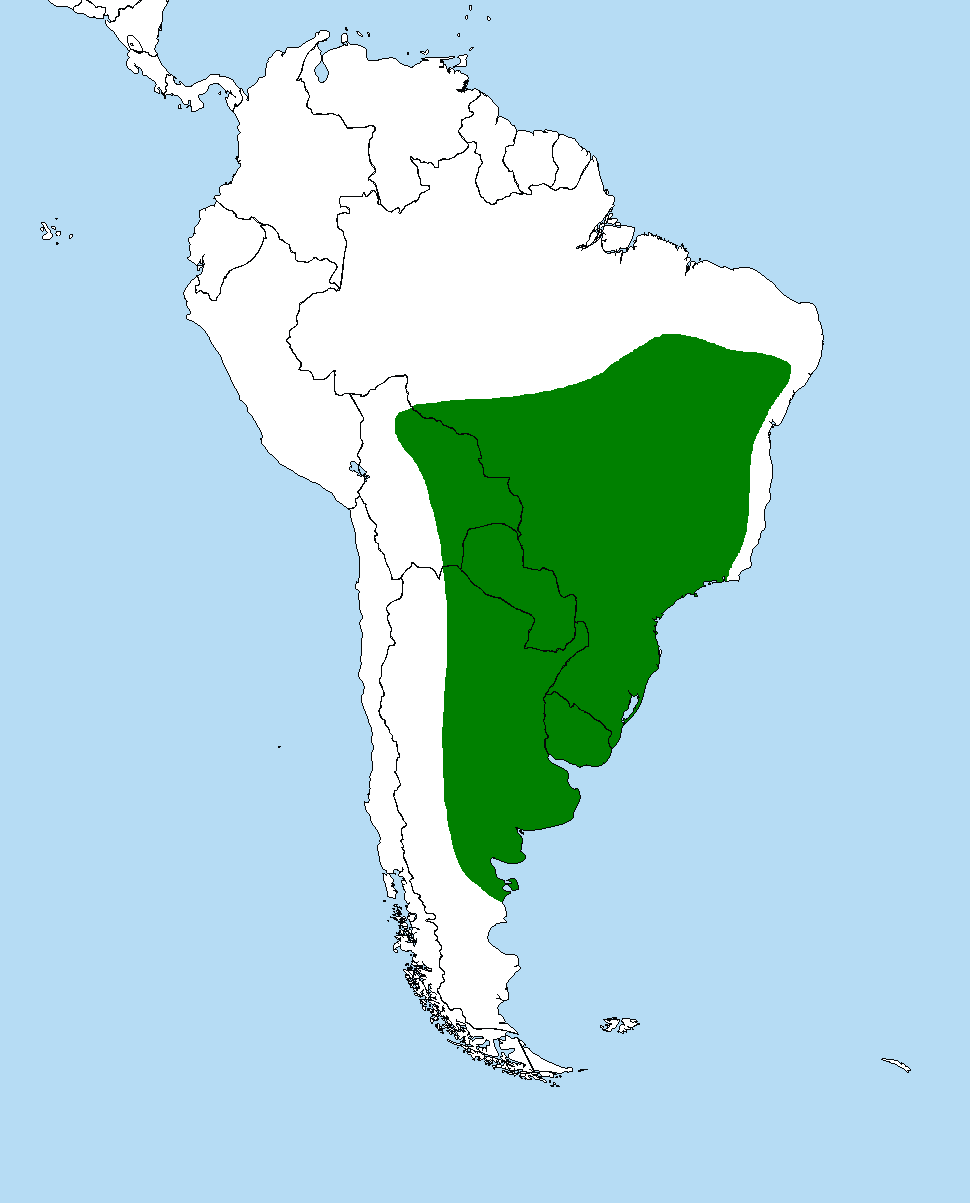

= Rufous hornero =

Species of bird

The rufous hornero (Furnarius rufus) is a medium-sized ovenbird in the family Furnariidae. It occurs in eastern South America and is the national bird of Argentina. Also known as the red ovenbird, it is common in savannas, second-growth scrub, pastures, and agricultural land and is synanthropic. Its range includes midwestern, southeastern, and southern Brazil, Bolivia, Paraguay, Uruguay, and northern and central Argentina, extending as far south as northern Patagonia. The species is most closely related to the crested hornero of Paraguay and Argentina. There are four accepted subspecies.

The rufous hornero is medium-sized with a square tail and very slightly decurved bill. The plumage is overall reddish brown with a dull brown crown and a whitish throat. Sexes are alike and juvenile birds are slightly paler below (probably because they are cleaner). Rufous horneros feed on insects and other arthropods obtained by foraging on the ground while walking. They sometimes feed on scraps such as bread crumbs. Songs in the rufous hornero are sexually distinct. The rapid trill that is usually heard as part of the duet is faster in the male and slower in the female, and both beat their wings at their sides while singing and the wings beat at the same rate as their trill. Thus, while watching an observer may identify the sex by how fast their wings beat while singing.

== Taxonomy ==
The first notes taken on the species were made by Philibert Commerson in 1767, from a specimen obtained at Barragán cove during Louis Antoine de Bougainville's expedition. Commerson named the bird Turdus fulvus and his notes were later published by Georges Buffon in his Histoire Naturelle in 1779. However, the rufous hornero was first scientifically described, as Merops rufus, by the German naturalist Johann Friedrich Gmelin in the 13th edition of Systema Naturae published in 1788.

In 1816, Louis Pierre Vieillot established the genus Furnarius in his Analyse d'une nouvelle ornithologie élémentaire and included the rufous hornero on it, although Vieillot did not directly rename the rufous hornero as Furnarius rufus. Its current scientific name was used for the first time in ornithology by John Gould in his Zoology of the Voyage of H.M.S. Beagle in 1841.

Nowadays the rufous hornero integrates the genus Furnarius with the other five species. They are all native to South America and build mud nests that resemble old wood-fired ovens. Its closest relative is the crested hornero, which is considered its sister species due to similar behavior and plumage pattern.

The derivation of the current genus name, Furnarius, is from the Latin furnus, meaning "an oven". The Spanish word "hornero" similarly comes from horno, meaning "oven". Its specific epithet comes from the Latin rufum, meaning "red" or "reddish". It is also known as the red ovenbird.

Four subspecies are recognized based on plumage and size:

- F. r. commersoni Pelzeln, 1868 – central, east, Bolivia, southwest Brazil and northwest Argentina
- F. r. paraguayae Cherrie & Reichenberger, 1921 – Paraguay and north Argentina
- F. r. rufus (Gmelin, JF, 1788) – southeast Brazil, Uruguay to central Argentina
- F. r. albogularis (Spix, 1824) – east Brazil

== Description ==
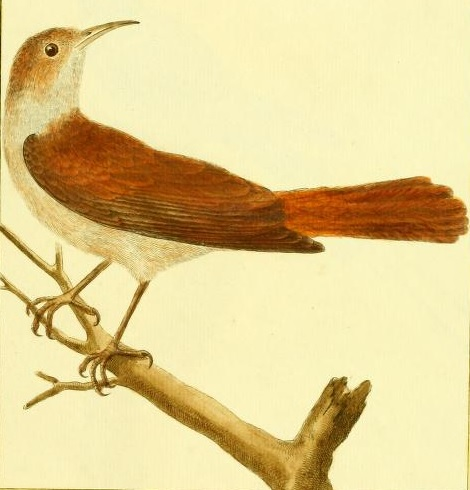
Rufous hornero drawn by François-Nicolas Martinet sometime before 1780 for the book Histoire Naturelle

The rufous hornero is a medium-sized ovenbird at 18 to 20 centimetres (7–8 in) and 31 to 58 grams (1.1–2.05 oz), with males being heavier. It has a slender and slightly decurved bill suited to eating insects, which is horn-coloured with a length of 2.5 centimetres (1.0 in). Wings length is 10.2 centimetres (4 in), with males generally being larger. The tail is short at 7.1 centimetres (2.8 in). The measurements of the species may differ due to the Bergmann's rule. The sexes have similar plumage. It has a rufous-brown back and pale buffy brown underparts. Its wings are pale brown except for the flight feathers which are blackish with cinnamon wingbars.

== Behaviour and ecology ==
=== Breeding ===
The rufous hornero breeds in the austral summer, laying eggs between August and December, raising nestlings soon after, and the young may stay in their natal territory until the following breeding season. The species is monogamous and the pair bond is long-term, sometimes for life. The nest of the species is typical for the genus, a large thick clay "oven" placed on a tree, or man-made structures such as fence posts, telephone poles, or buildings. Pairs remain together throughout the year and will work on the nest during that time; nests can be constructed in as little as 5 days but usually take longer, occasionally months, to complete. A clutch generally contains two to four eggs. The eggs are laid every second day and incubated for 14–18 days. Chicks are fed for 23–26 days before fledging; young birds remain in the parental territory for around 6 months after fledging and sometimes until the following breeding season. Both parents incubate eggs and feed the young. Horneros may or may not reuse nests; therefore, it is quite common to see several nests close to each other (or even atop older nests) at the same nesting site. However, a formerly unused nest may be repaired for a new breeding season.

=== Threats ===
Predators of adult and young rufous horneros include birds of prey such as the black-chested buzzard-eagle Buteo melanoleucus, small mammals, domestic cats, and a number of species of snakes and possibly lizards. However, its covered nest probably reduces predation risk.

== Status ==
The rufous hornero has benefited from human changes to the environment and many live in highly modified habitats, such as city suburbs. In turn, abandoned hornero nests may be of benefit to various other species of birds that nest in its unused "ovens". The saffron finch is one species that commonly nests in old ovenbird nests. The rufous hornero is a familiar sight over much of its range and has been adopted as a national bird of Argentina. It is not threatened by human activities and is listed as least concern by the IUCN.

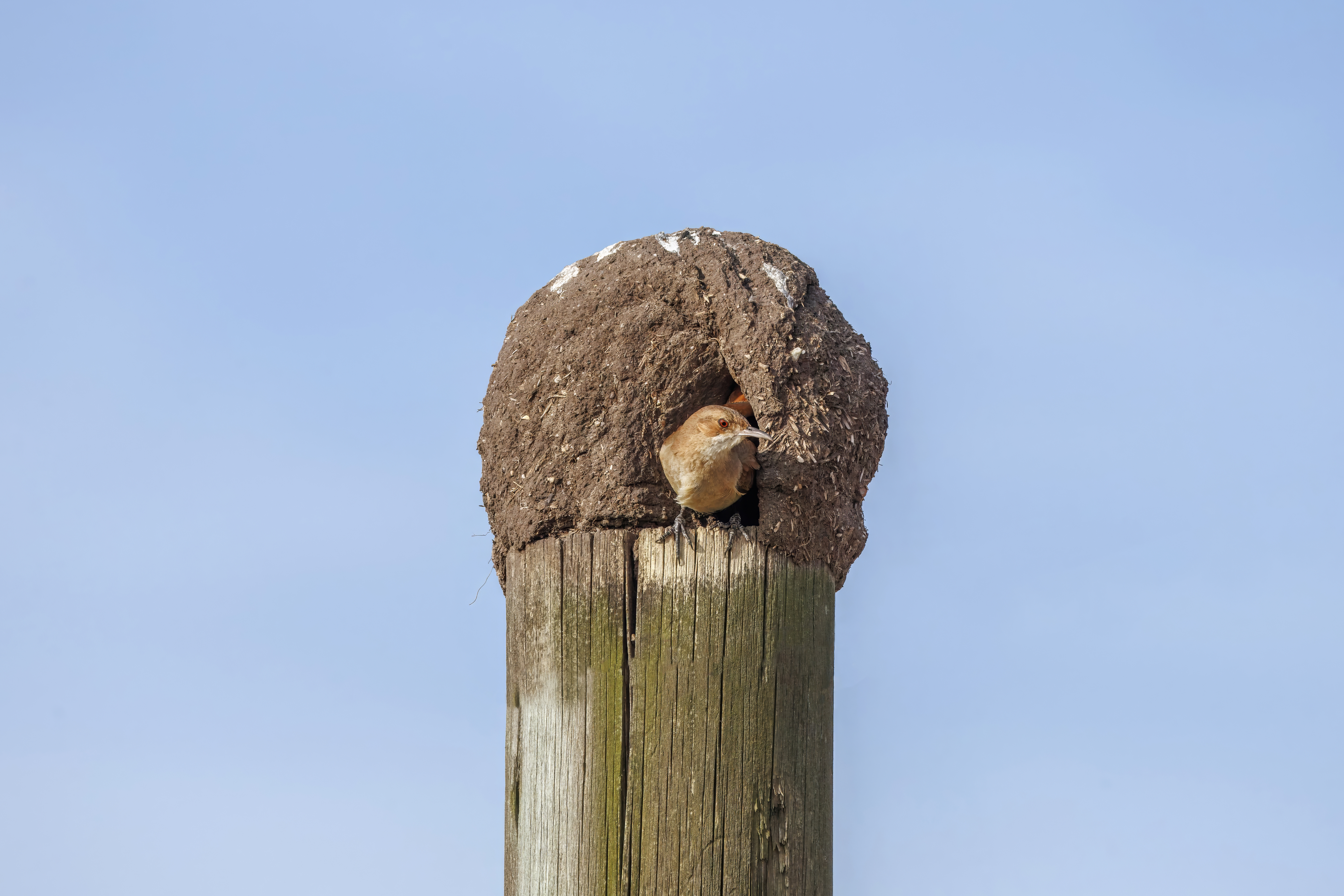
F. r. rufus
at nest
Colonia Department, Uruguay

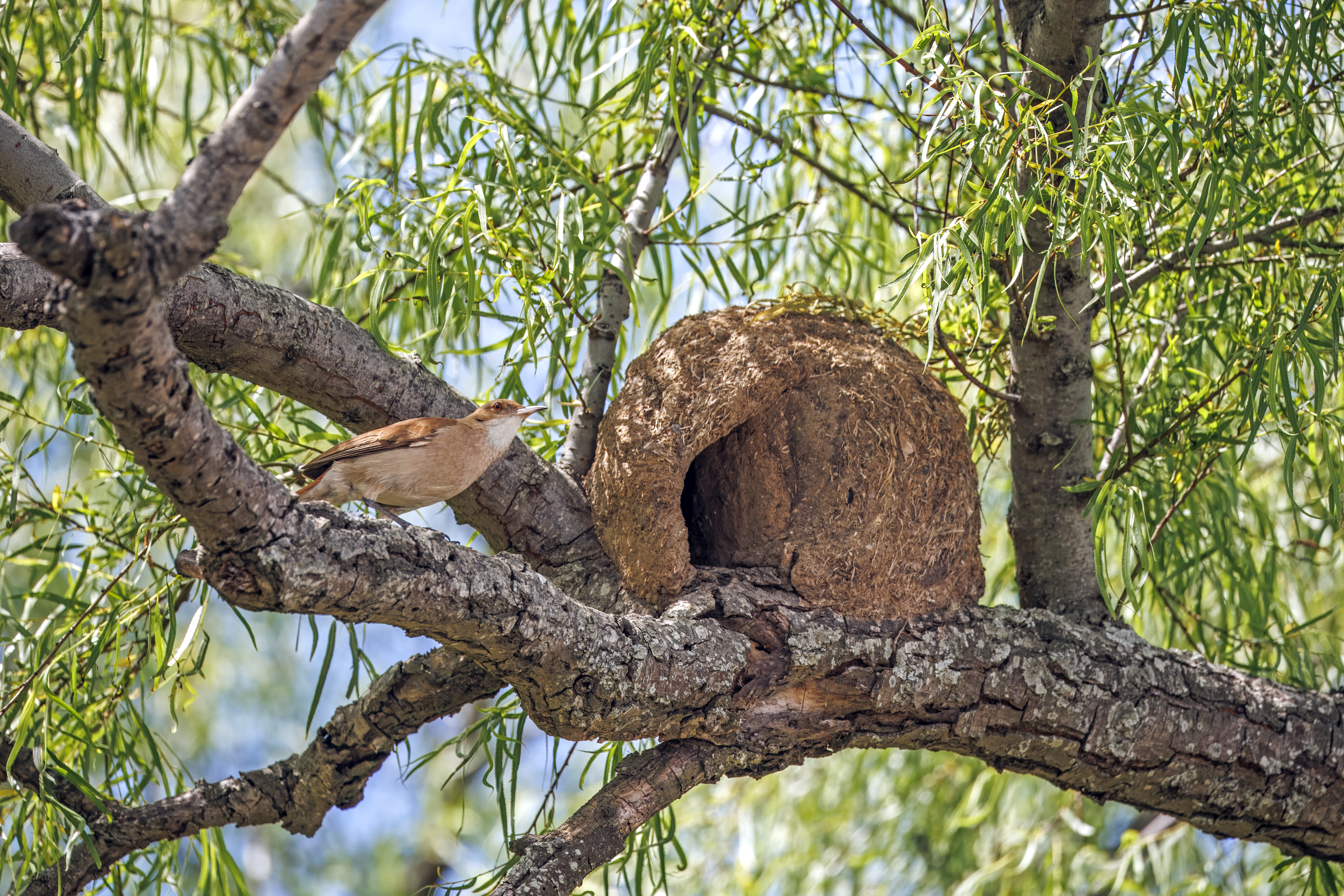
F. r. rufus
outside nest
Colonia del Sacramento, Uruguay

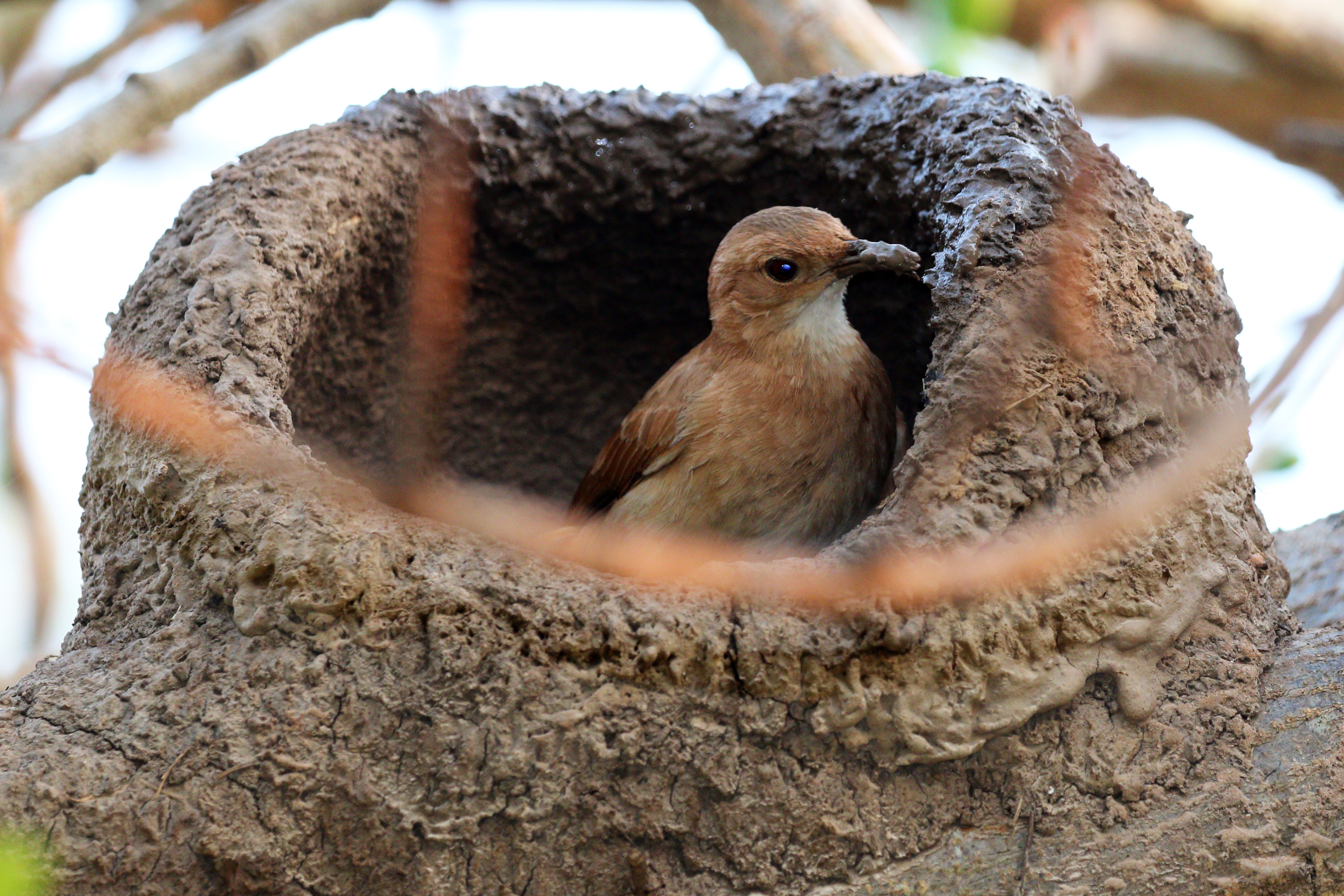
F. r. commersoni
building nest
The Pantanal, Brazil

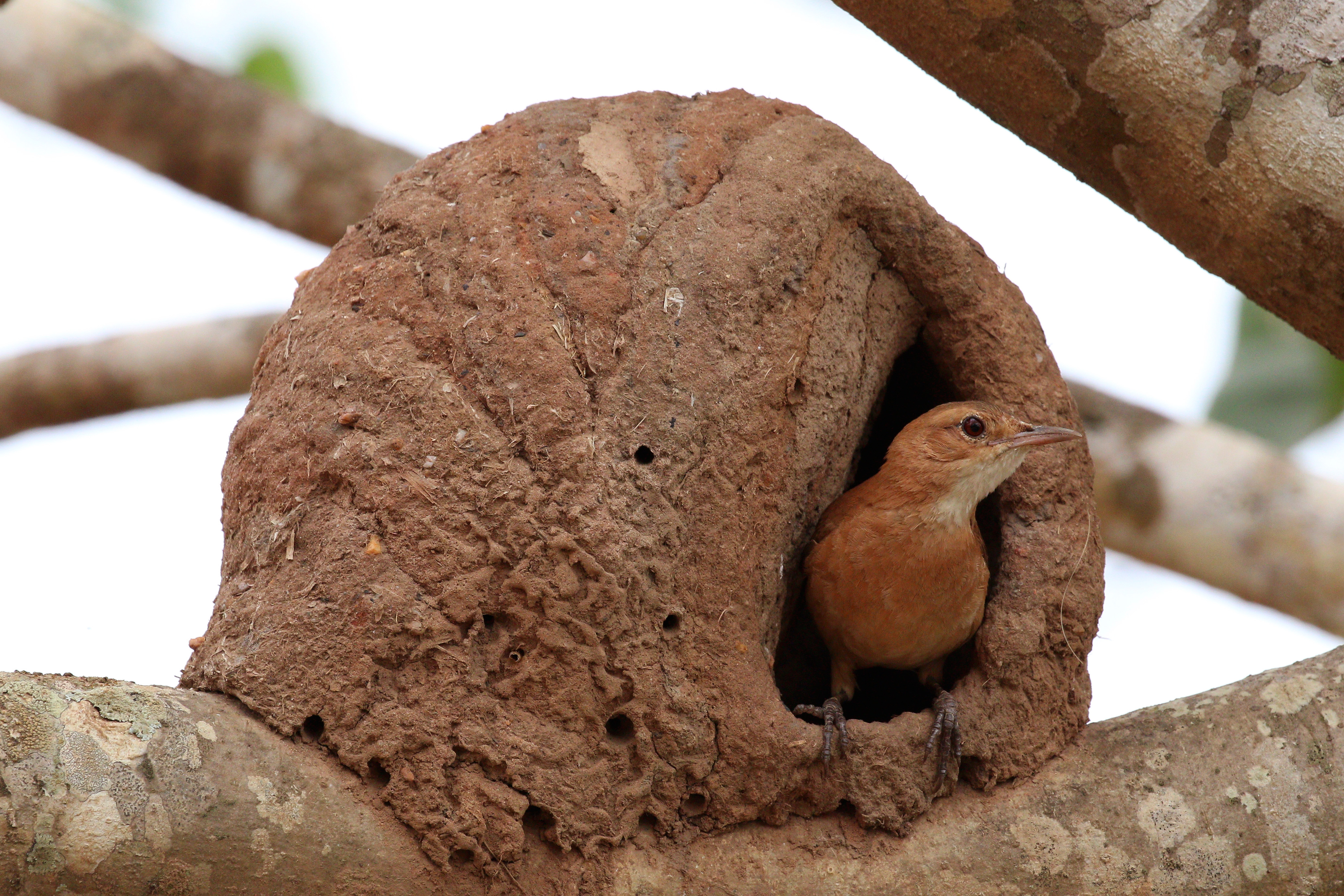
F. r. commersoni
at completed nest
The Pantanal, Brazil

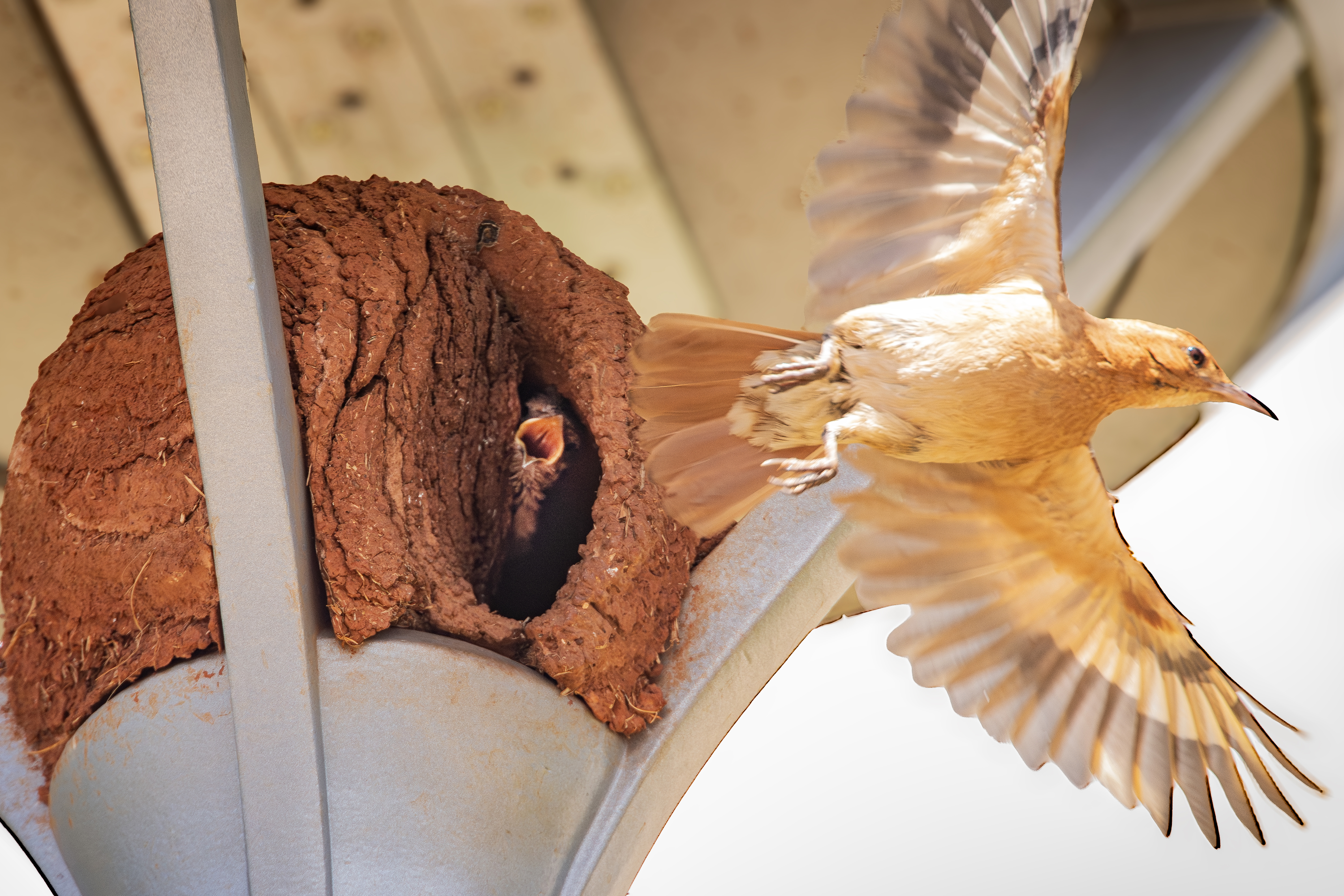
Leaving nest with chick
Brasilia, Brazil

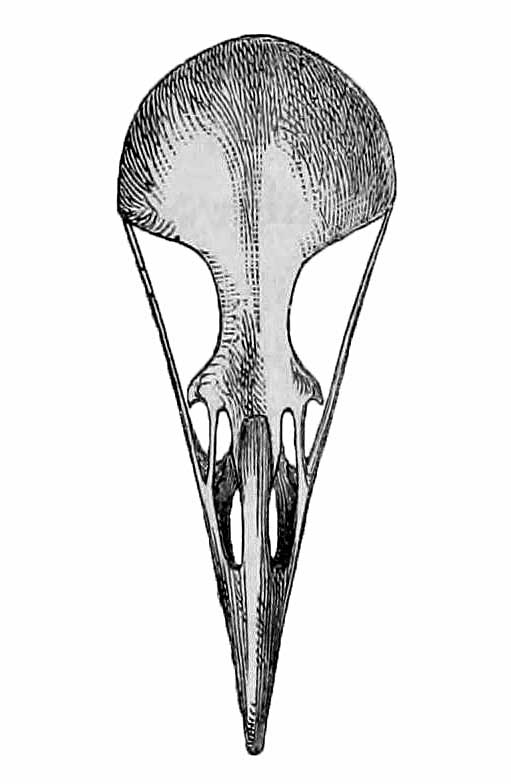
Skull

== Sources ==
- Borror, Donald J. (1960). Dictionary of Word Roots and Combining Forms (PDF). Mountain View, California: Mayfield Publishing Company. Archived from the original on 2016-11-30. Reprint: ISBN 978-0-87484-053-7.
- Buffon, Georges (1779). Histoire Naturelle des Oiseaux. Vol. 6. Paris: Imprimerie royale.
- Cherrie, George K.; Reichenberger, Elsie M. B. (28 December 1921). "Descriptions of Proposed New Birds from Brazil, Paraguay, and Argentina". American Museum Novitates. 1 (27). New York City: American Museum of Natural History: 5.
- Dunning, John Jr. (2008). CRC Handbook of Avian Body Masses (Second ed.). Boca Raton: CRC Press. ISBN 978-1-4200-6444-5.
- Fraga, R. M. (1980). "The Breeding of Rufous Horneros (Furnarius rufus)". The Condor, 82:58–68. doi:10.2307/1366785. JSTOR 1366785.
- Gmelin, Johann Friedrich (1788). Systema Naturae. Vol. 1. Leipzig.
- Gould, John (1841). The Zoology of the Voyage of H.M.S. Beagle. London: Smith, Elder & Co.
- Hudson, W. H.; Sclater, P. L. (2010). Argentine Ornithology: A Descriptive Catalogue of the Birds of the Argentine Republic. Volume 1. Charleston: Nabu Press. ISBN 978-114-48-2099-0.
- Jobling, James A. (2010). Helm Dictionary of Scientific Bird Names. London: Christopher Helm. ISBN 978-1-4081-2501-4.
- Narosky, Tito; Carman, Raúl (2008). El Hornero, Ave Nacional. Buenos Aires: Albatros. ISBN 978-950-24-1245-0.
- Remsen, V. (2003). Family Furnariidae (Ovenbirds). del Hoyo J., Elliott A. & Christie D.A. (2003). Handbook of the Birds of the World. Volume 8: Broadbills to Tapaculos. Barcelona: Lynx Edicions. ISBN 84-87334-50-4.
- Ridgely, Robert; Tudor, Guy (1994). The Birds of South America. Vol. II: The Suboscine Passerines. Austin, TX: University of Texas Press. ISBN 0-292-77063-4.
- Ridgely, Robert; Tudor, Guy (2009). Field Guide to the Songbirds of South America: The Passerines. Austin: University of Texas Press. ISBN 978-0-292-71748-0.
- Rodrigues, M. N., Roper, J.J. (2011). "An Experimental Test of the Benefits of Hatching Asynchrony in the Rufous Hornero (Furnarius Rufus)". Revista Brasileira de Ornitologia, 19:17–21.
- Roper, J. J. (Summer 2005). "Sexually Distinct Songs in the Duet of the Sexually Monomorphic Rufous Hornero/(Diferenças sexuais nos cantos de dueto da espécie monomórfica Furnarius rufus)". Journal of Field Ornithology, 76(3): 234–236. JSTOR 4151202.
- Saunders, Howard (1883). Vieillot's Analyse d'une nouvelle ornithologie élémentaire. London: Taylor & Francis.
- von Pelzeln, August (1868). Zur Ornithologie Brasiliens, Resultate von Johann Natterers Reisen in den Jahren 1817 bis 1835. Vienna: A. Pichler's Witwe & Sohn.
- von Spix, Johann Baptist (1824). Avium species novae quas in itinere Annis MDCCCXVII - MDCCCXX per Brasiliam. Vol. 1. Munich: Impensis editores.
