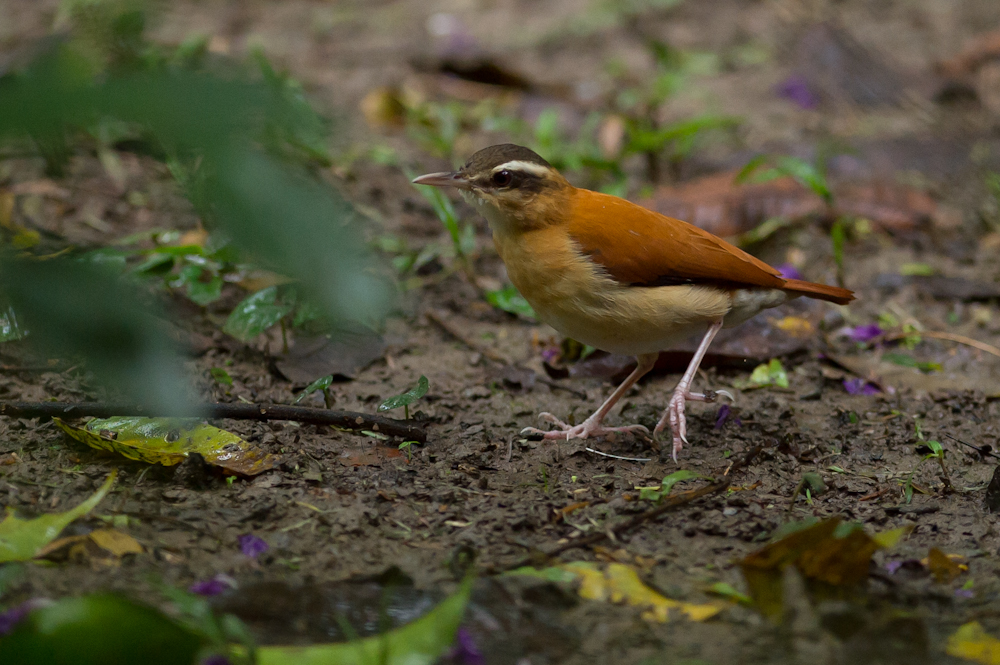

Conservation status
- Least Concern (IUCN 3.1)

Scientific classification
- Kingdom: Animalia
- Phylum: Chordata
- Class: Aves
- Order: Passeriformes
- Family: Furnariidae
- Genus: Furnarius
- Species: F. leucopus

Binomial name
- Furnarius leucopus Swainson, 1838

= Pale-legged hornero =

Species of bird

The pale-legged hornero (Furnarius leucopus) is a species of bird in the Furnariinae subfamily of the ovenbird family Furnariidae. It is found in Bolivia, Brazil, Guyana, and Peru.

== Taxonomy and systematics ==
The pale-legged hornero's taxonomy is unsettled. The International Ornithological Committee (IOC), BirdLife International's Handbook of the Birds of the World (HBW), and the Clements taxonomy assign it these four subspecies:

- F. l. leucopus Swainson, 1838
- F. l. tricolor Giebel, 1868
- F. l. araguaiae Pinto & Camargo, 1952
- F. l. assimilis Cabanis & Heine, 1860

The South American Classification Committee of the American Ornithological Society (SACC) adds three others, F. l. cinnamomeus (Lesson, 1844), F. l. longirostris (von Pelzeln, 1856), and F. l. endoecus (Cory, 1919). The IOC, HBW, and Clements treat cinnamomeus as the species Pacific hornero and the other two as the Caribbean hornero. Early authors (e.g. Chapman) had treated them separately. The SACC accepts that cinnamomeus may deserve species rank but declined to make the split due to "insufficient published data".

Some authors have treated what is now the pale-billed hornero (F. torridus) as a subspecies of the pale-legged hornero.

This article follows the four-subspecies model.

== Description ==
The pale-legged hornero is 15 to 18 cm (5.9 to 7.1 in) long and weighs about 37 to 49 g (1.3 to 1.7 oz). It is a medium-sized hornero with a long and nearly straight bill. The sexes' plumages are alike. Adults of the nominate subspecies F. l. leucopus have a wide whitish supercilium, brownish gray ear coverts, and a tawny-rufous malar area. Their crown is dark rufescent brown. Their back, rump, and uppertail coverts average bright orange rufous but vary between tawny rufous and rufous amber. Their tail is chestnut. Their wing coverts are chestnut and their flight feathers blackish with a wide chestnut band. Their throat is white that becomes tawny-ochraceous on the breast. Their flanks are paler tawny-ochraceous, the center to their belly nearly whitish, and their undertail coverts whitish with dark brown bases. Their iris is usually reddish brown or chestnut, and gray-brown or gray in tricolor. Their maxilla is dusky horn at its base with a paler culmen and tip and their mandible is also pale. Their legs and feet are pale pinkish, pearly gray, or whitish. Juveniles resemble adults but for a visibly shorter bill and the shape of their flight and tail feathers.

Subspecies F. l. tricolor has a grayer crown, more ochraceous back, and paler wings and tail than the nominate. F. l. assimilis has a lighter, more ochraceous rump, wings, and tail than tricolor, and a paler wing band. F. l. araguaiae is intermediate between tricolor and assimilis, with a brighter back than the former and a smaller wing band.

== Distribution and habitat ==
The subspecies of the pale-legged hornero are found thus:

- F. l. leucopus: along the rios Negro and Branco in northern Brazil and in southwestern Guyana
- F. l. tricolor: eastern Peru, western Brazil east into Pará, and into Bolivia to Santa Cruz Department; one record in southeastern Ecuador
- F. l. araguaiae: western Tocantins and eastern Mato Grosso states in central Brazil along the rios Araguaia and das Mortes
- F. l. assimilis: eastern and southern Brazil between Maranhão, Pernambuco, and Mato Grosso do Sul, and extreme southeastern Bolivia

The pale-legged hornero inhabits a wide variety of semi-open to open landscapes. These include forest and woodlands along rivers (gallery forest), the edges of secondary forest, agricultural areas, and parks and gardens in towns. It favors humid areas, usually near water. In elevation it mostly occurs below 1,100 m (3,600 ft), though it seldom exceeds 400 m (1,300 ft) in Bolivia and locally reaches 1,700 m (5,600 ft) in Peru.

== Behavior ==
=== Movement ===
The pale-legged hornero is essentially a year-round resident throughout its range. The record in Ecuador and a few others outside its usual range could be "more or less local movements, sometimes following rivers, or otherwise overlooked populations?".

=== Feeding ===
The pale-legged hornero's diet is mostly a variety of arthropods. It also includes other small invertebrates like snails and there is one record of an individual eating a toad. It forages singly or in pairs while walking on the ground, turning over leaves to glean its prey.

=== Breeding ===
The pale-legged hornero's breeding biology is "[s]urprisingly poorly known for such a relatively abundant, noisy, and conspicuous species". Its breeding season has not been defined. Though its nest has not been formally described, it is an "oven" of clay and animal dung with an inner chamber lined with dry plant matter. Both members of a pair construct it, typically on a tree branch but also on horizontal structures like the crossbars of utility poles. The clutch size is not known. The incubation period at one nest in Peru was 16 to 17 days and the time to fledging 26 to 33 days. Both parents provisioned the nestlings.

=== Vocalization ===
The pale-legged hornero's song is a "long series of loud, explosive, piercing, staccato notes, which decelerates and descends in pitch...rendered PIPIPI'PI'pi'pi-pi-pi-pi-pi pee pee pu". Its calls are "a loud, rich, scratchy or reedy chet or kyeek, or a descending cheeop".

== Status ==
The IUCN has assessed the pale-legged hornero as being of Least Concern. It has a very large range, and though its population size is not known it is believed to be increasing. No immediate threats have been identified. It is considered uncommon to very common. It "[b]enefits from moderate anthropogenic habitat alteration, and...it has extended its range into deforested areas". It occurs in several protected areas.
