= Northern golden bulbul =

There are six species of bird named northern golden bulbul that were split into distinct species:

- Sangihe golden bulbul, Hypsipetes platenae
- Togian golden bulbul, Hypsipetes aureus
- Banggai golden bulbul, Hypsipetes harterti
- Sula golden bulbul, Hypsipetes longirostris
- Halmahera golden bulbul, Hypsipetes chloris
- Obi golden bulbul, Hypsipetes lucasi
