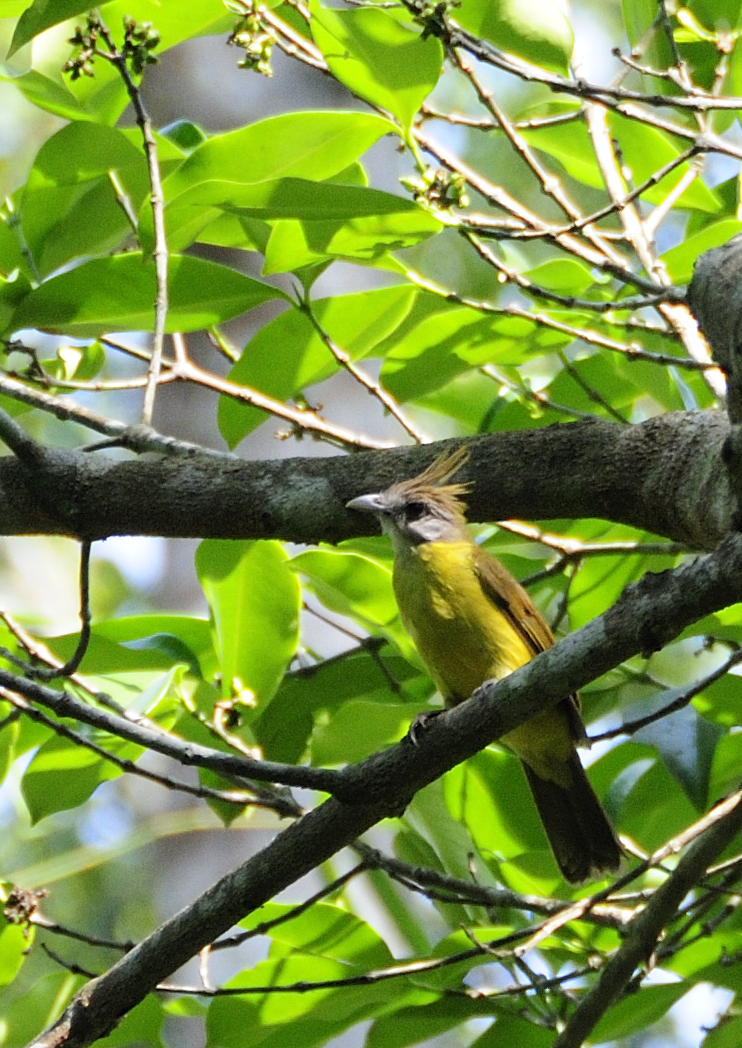
- White-throated bulbul (Alophoixus flaveolus)

Scientific classification
- Kingdom: Animalia
- Phylum: Chordata
- Class: Aves
- Order: Passeriformes
- Family: Pycnonotidae
- Genus: Alophoixus; Oates, 1889

Type species
- Ixos phaeocephalus Hartlaub, 1844

Species
- see text
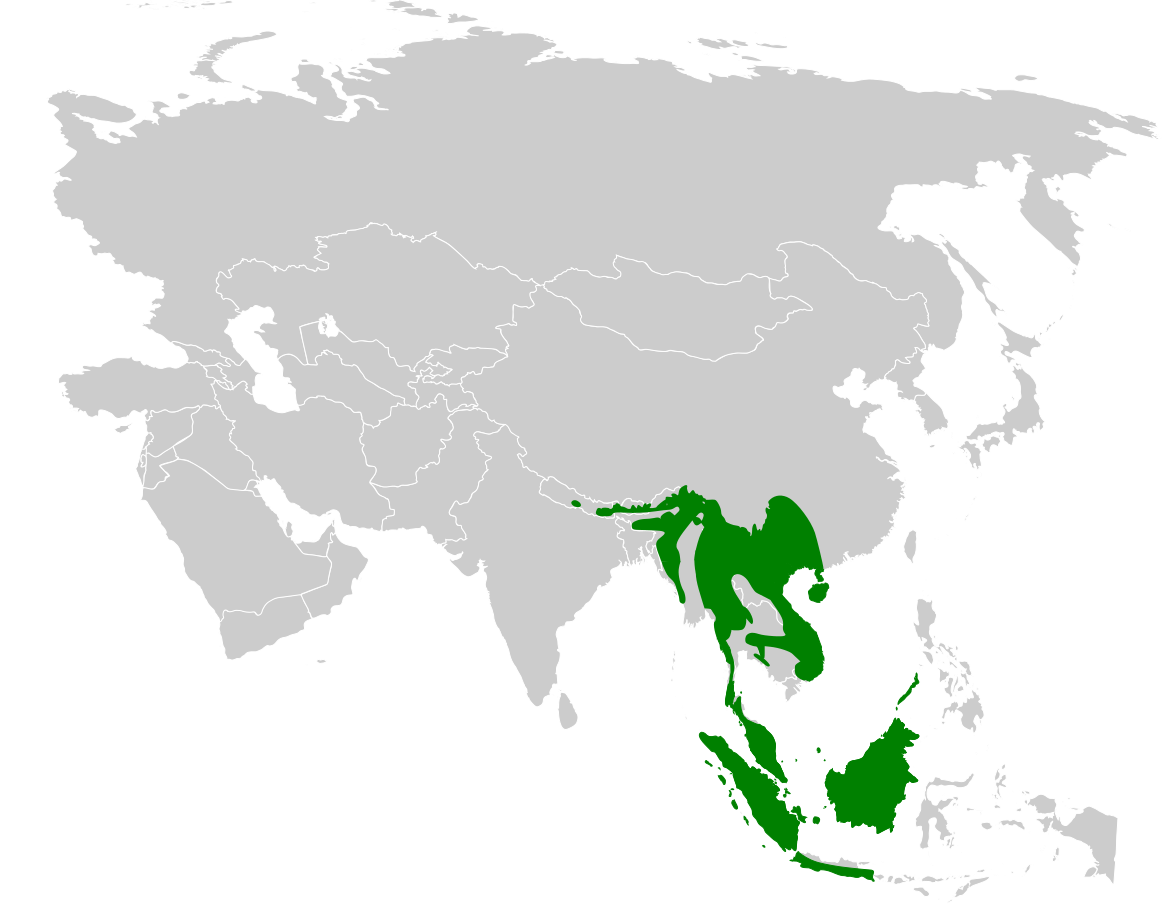

= Alophoixus =

Genus of birds

Alophoixus is a genus of songbird in the bulbul family, Pycnonotidae found in south-eastern Asia.

== Taxonomy and systematics ==
The genus Alophoixus was introduced in 1889 by the English naturalist Eugene W. Oates in the first volume on birds in The Fauna of British India, Including Ceylon and Burma. Oates introduced the new genus to contain a single species, Ixos phaeocephalus, the yellow-bellied bulbul, that had been described by Gustav Hartlaub in 1844. This is the type species. The genus name is from Ancient Greek αλοφος/alophos meaning "without a crest".

- - - - - - - - Hypsipetes
            - - Acritillas
              - Hemixos
          - Ixos
        - Alcurus
      - Iole
    - Alophoixus
  - Tricholestes

Evolutionary relationships based on Fuchs et al., 2018.

=== Extant species ===
Up to 2009, all the extant species of the genus Alophoixus were classified within the genus Criniger. Currently, there are eight species recognized:

Image	Common name	Scientific name	Distribution
	Yellow-bellied bulbul	Alophoixus phaeocephalus	Malay Peninsula, Sumatra, Mentawai Islands (west of central Sumatra), Bintan, Riau and Lingga Islands (east of central Sumatra), Bangka Belitung Islands (east of south Sumatra), Natuna Islands (northwest of Borneo) and Borneo
	Palawan bulbul	Alophoixus frater	southwestern Philippines (Balabac Island, Busuanga, Calamianes, and Palawan)
	Grey-cheeked bulbul	Alophoixus tephrogenys	Malay Peninsula to Greater Sunda Islands
	Penan bulbul	Alophoixus ruficrissus	montane Borneo
	Brown-cheeked bulbul	Alophoixus bres	Java and Bali
	White-throated bulbul	Alophoixus flaveolus	eastern Himalayas to Myanmar and west Thailand
	Ochraceous bulbul	Alophoixus ochraceus	Southeast Asia to Sumatra
	Puff-throated bulbul	Alophoixus pallidus	Southeast Asia

=== Former species ===
Formerly, some authorities also considered the following species (or subspecies) as species within the genus Alophoixus:

- Seram golden bulbul (as Alophoixus affinis)
- Northern golden bulbul (as Alophoixus longirostris)
- Sangihe golden bulbul (as Alophoixus platenae)
- Togian golden bulbul (as Alophoixus aureus)
- Halmahera golden bulbul (as Alophoixus chloris)
- Obi golden bulbul (as Alophoixus lucasi)
- Buru golden bulbul (as Alophoixus mystacalis)
- Finsch's bulbul (Alophoixus finschii, now Iole finschii)
