= Ambon golden bulbul =

Scientific classification
- Kingdom: Animalia
- Phylum: Chordata
- Class: Aves
- Order: Passeriformes
- Family: Pycnonotidae
- Genus: Hypsipetes
- Species: H. flavicaudus

Binomial name
- Hypsipetes flavicaudus (Bonaparte, 1850)

Synonyms
- Hypsipetes affinis flavicaudus; Trichophorus flavicaudus

Species of bird

The Ambon golden bulbul (Hypsipetes flavicaudus) is a species of bird in the family Pycnonotidae. It is endemic to Ambon Island in Indonesia. Until recently, it was considered conspecific with the Seram golden bulbul. It was described by Charles Lucien Bonaparte in 1850. It is monotypic.

== Taxonomy and systematics ==
The Ambon golden bulbul is one of nine species in the golden bulbul complex, a group of closely-related bulbuls found in Indonesia that were all formerly considered to be subspecies of a single, wide-ranging Hypsipetes affinis (now restricted to the Seram golden bulbul). Beginning in the 2000s, these species were gradually split on the basis of genetic, morphological, and vocal evidence supporting their placement as distinct species. The Seram and Ambon golden bulbuls were the last two species in this complex to be split, with the latter being considered a subspecies of the former as late as 2025. The Ambon golden bulbul was eventually separated from the Seram golden bulbul in AviList 2026 due to differences in tail morphology, highly divergent vocalizations, and differences in their response to playback.

== Description ==
The Ambon golden bulbul is a large, long-billed bulbul, growing to an average length of 22–24 cm (8.7–9.4 in) and an average weight of 46 g (1.6 oz). It has mostly olive-yellow upperparts, with yellow lores and spiky plumes on the back of the neck. The underparts are lighter and yellower than the upperparts, with the yellowest plumage on the throat. The tip of the tail is bright yellow. These bulbuls have blackish bills and brownish-red eyes.

This species is similar to the Seram golden bulbul, but has longer wings, is lighter and yellower on the upperside and has a deeper yellow throat.

== Distribution and habitat ==
The Ambon golden bulbul is endemic to Ambon, an island in the Maluku Islands, an archipelago in eastern Indonesia.

== Habits ==
The call of this species is significantly different from that of the Seram golden bulbul. This species emits more notes per strophe and has shorter first note and last three notes.
