= Hypsipetes affinis harterti =

Hypsipetes affinis harterti may refer to:

- Taiwan brown-eared bulbul, a subspecies of bird found in Taiwan
- Banggai golden bulbul, a subspecies of bird found in Indonesia
