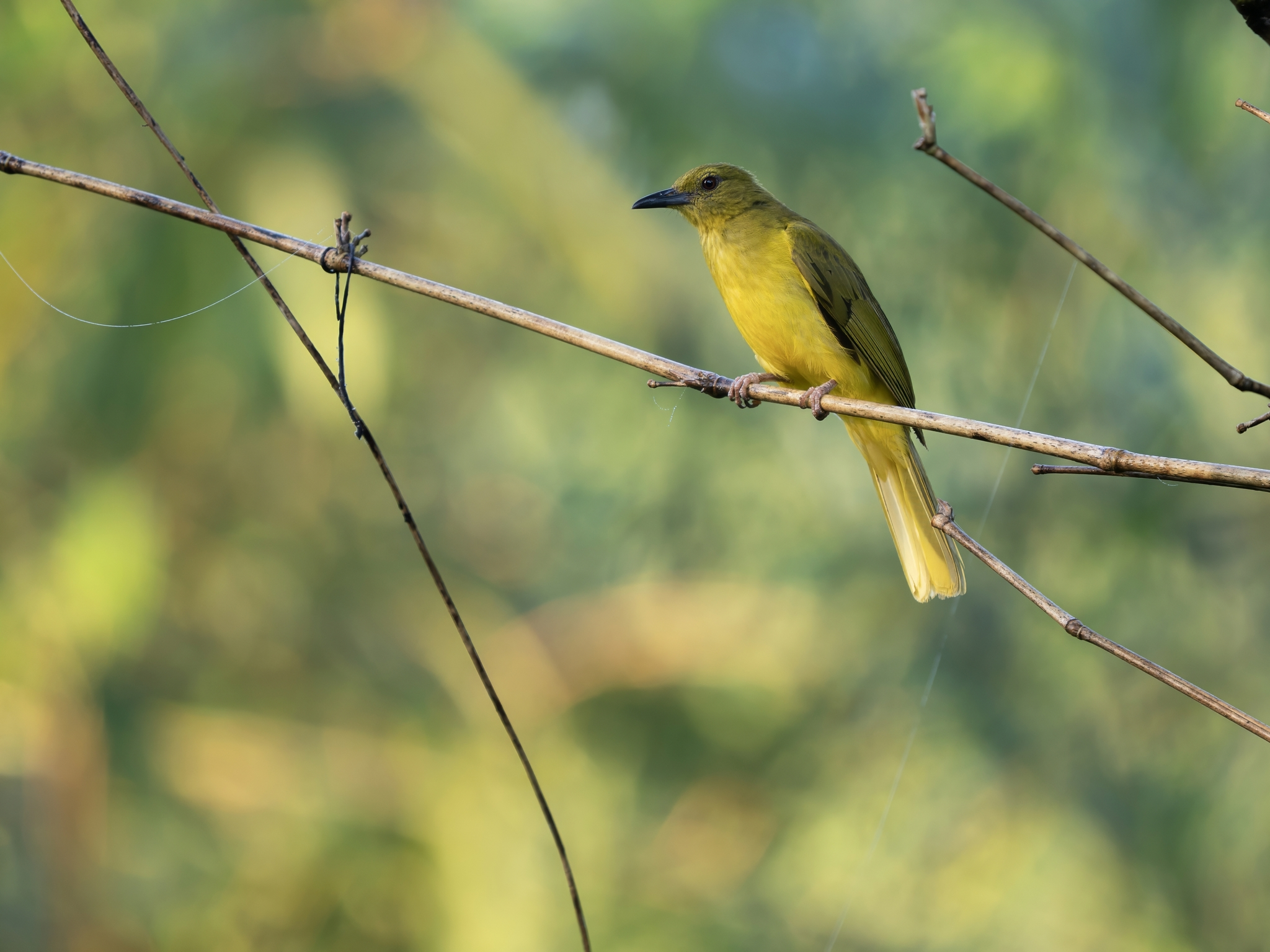
- Golden bulbul

Conservation status
- Least Concern (IUCN 3.1)

Scientific classification
- Kingdom: Animalia
- Phylum: Chordata
- Class: Aves
- Order: Passeriformes
- Family: Pycnonotidae
- Genus: Hypsipetes
- Species: H. longirostris

Binomial name
- Hypsipetes longirostris (Wallace, 1863)

Synonyms
- Criniger longirostris; Alophoixus longirostris

= Sula golden bulbul =

Species of songbird

The Sula golden bulbul (Hypsipetes longirostris) is a species of songbird in the bulbul family Pycnonotidae. It is endemic to the Sula Islands (east of Sulawesi) in Indonesia. Its natural habitat is subtropical or tropical moist lowland forests.

== Taxonomy ==
The Sula golden bulbul was originally classified in the genus Criniger, and has also been previously been placed in the genera Thapsinillas and Alophoixus. It is one of nine species in the golden bulbul complex, a group of closely-related bulbuls found in Indonesia that were all formerly considered to be subspecies of a single, wide-ranging Hypsipetes affinis (now restricted to the Seram golden bulbul). Beginning in the 2000s, these species were gradually split on the basis of genetic, morphological, and vocal evidence supporting their placement as distinct species. The Sula golden bulbul was separated as a distinct species in 2013 on the basis of morphological and vocal differences with other species. It is especially similar to the Banggai golden bulbul, but differs slightly from that species in its appearance. The two species also have markedly distinct vocalizations.

== Description ==
A large, long-billed, and short-legged species of bulbul, the Sula golden bulbul grows to an average length of 23–24 cm (9.1–9.4 in). It is largely yellowish-olive above, with yellow undersides that are washed olive on the flanks and breast.

== Distribution and habitat ==
The Sula golden bulbul is endemic to the Sula Islands, an archipelago in eastern Indonesia located off the eastern coast of Sulawesi. On the main island of Taliabu, the species can be seen at elevations of up to 1,200 m (3,900 ft). A forest bird, it is known to inhabit both pristine and disturbed forests.
