= Sri Lanka bulbul =

Sri Lanka bulbul may refer to:

- a subspecies of the square-tailed bulbul found in Sri Lanka
- Yellow-eared bulbul, a species of bird found in Sri Lanka
