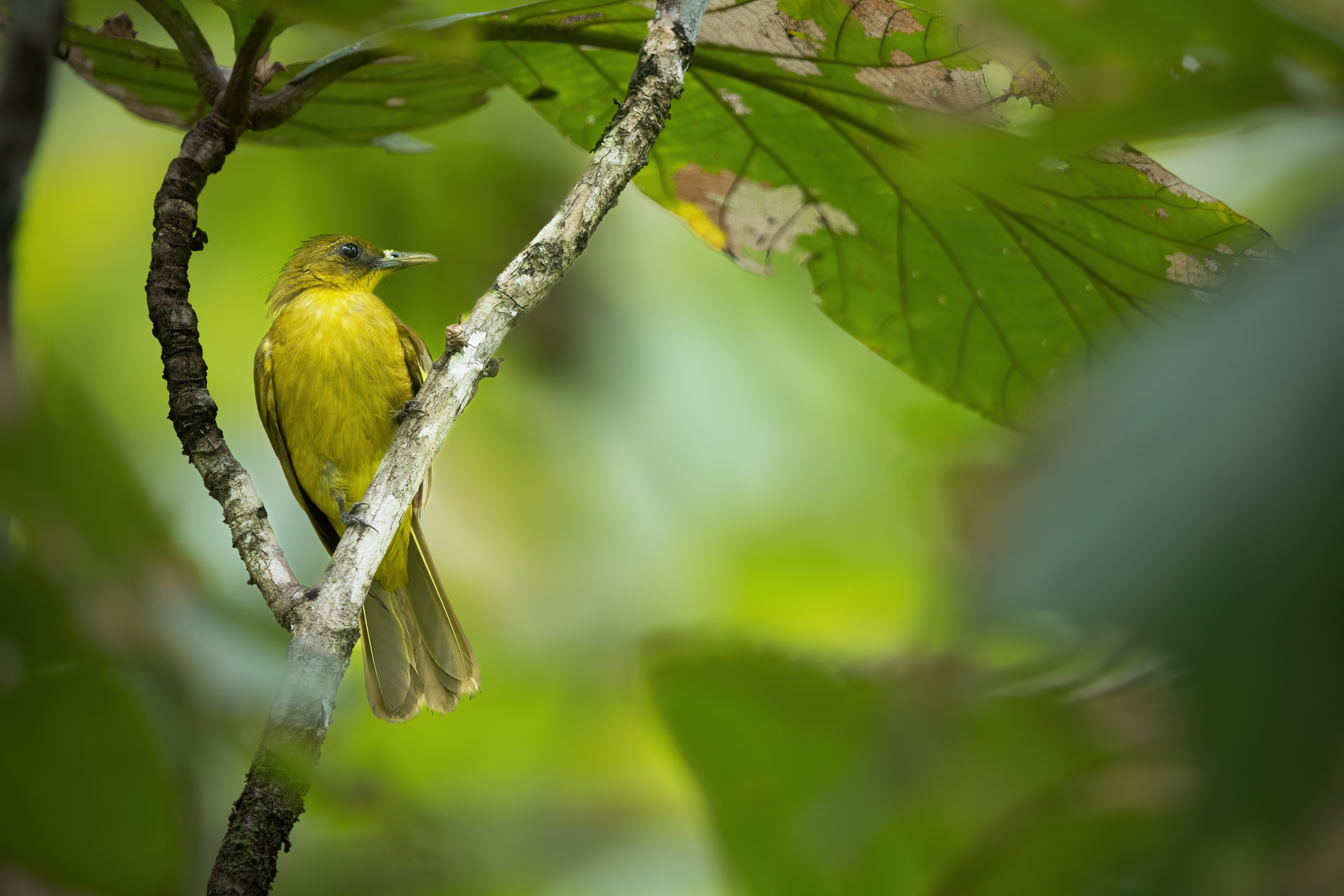

Conservation status
- Least Concern (IUCN 3.1)

Scientific classification
- Kingdom: Animalia
- Phylum: Chordata
- Class: Aves
- Order: Passeriformes
- Family: Pycnonotidae
- Genus: Hypsipetes
- Species: H. chloris

Binomial name
- Hypsipetes chloris (Finsch, 1867)

= Halmahera golden bulbul =

Species of songbird

The Halmahera golden bulbul (Hypsipetes chloris) is a species of passerine bird in the bulbul family of Pycnonotidae. It is found in Morotai, Halmahera and Bacan Islands, Indonesia. Its natural habitat is subtropical or tropical moist lowland forests.

== Taxonomy ==
The Halmahera golden bulbul was originally classified in the genus Criniger, and has also been previously been placed in the genera Thapsinillas and Alophoixus. It is one of nine species in the golden bulbul complex, a group of closely-related bulbuls found in Indonesia that were all formerly considered to be subspecies of a single, wide-ranging Hypsipetes affinis (now restricted to the Seram golden bulbul). Beginning in the 2000s, these species were gradually split on the basis of genetic, morphological, and vocal evidence supporting their placement as distinct species. The Halmahera golden bulbul was separated as a distinct species in 2013 on the basis of morphological and vocal differences with other species. It is especially similar to the Obi golden bulbul, but differs slightly from that species in its appearance. The two species also have distinct vocalizations.

== Description ==
A large, long-billed species of bulbul, the Halmahera golden bulbul grows to an average length of 20 cm (7.9 in) and an average weight of 38–42 cm (15–17 in). It is largely olive in colour, with the exception of its yellowish throat, yellowish underparts, and blackish lores.

== Distribution and habitat ==
The Halmahera golden bulbul is endemic to the northern Maluku Islands in eastern Indonesia, where it inhabits the islands of Halmahera, Morotai, and Bacan. A common forest bird, it is known to inhabit both pristine and disturbed forests.
