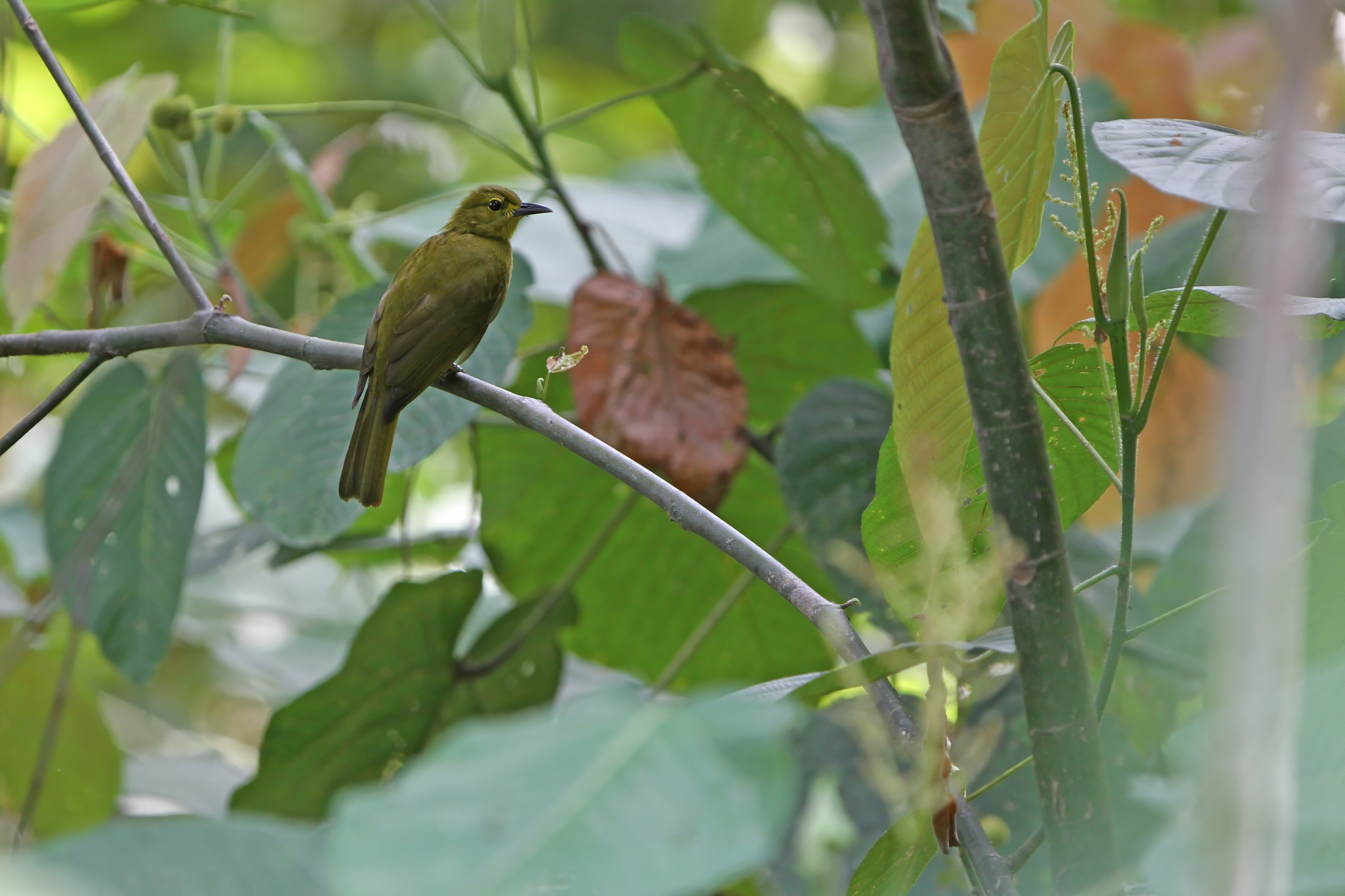

Conservation status
- Least Concern (IUCN 3.1)

Scientific classification
- Kingdom: Animalia
- Phylum: Chordata
- Class: Aves
- Order: Passeriformes
- Family: Pycnonotidae
- Genus: Hypsipetes
- Species: H. mysticalis

Binomial name
- Hypsipetes mysticalis (Wallace, 1863)

Synonyms
- Alophoixus affinis mystacalis; Alophoixus affinis mysticalis; Alophoixus mystacalis; Criniger mystacalis; Hypsipetes affinis mystacalis; Hypsipetes affinis mysticalis; Ixos affinis mystacalis; Ixos affinis mysticalis; Thapsinillas affinis mystacalis; Thapsinillas affinis mysticalis; Thapsinillas mystacalis

= Buru golden bulbul =

Species of songbird

The Buru golden bulbul (Hypsipetes mysticalis) is a species of songbird in the bulbul family. It is endemic to Buru Island. Its natural habitat is subtropical or tropical moist lowland forests.

== Taxonomy and systematics ==
The Buru golden bulbul was originally classified in the genus Criniger, and has also been classified in the genus Alophoixus. It is one of nine species in the golden bulbul complex, a group of closely-related bulbuls found in Indonesia that were all formerly considered to be subspecies of a single, wide-ranging Hypsipetes affinis (now restricted to the Seram golden bulbul). Beginning in the 2000s, these species were gradually split on the basis of genetic, morphological, and vocal evidence supporting their placement as distinct species. The Buru golden bulbul was separated as a distinct species in 2013 on the basis of morphological and vocal differences.

== Description ==
The Buru golden bulbul grows to an average length of 21 cm (8.3 in). It is largely olive-green in colour, with yellow lores and a paler vent and chin. Compared to the Seram golden bulbul, it is much more olive-green, lacking the yellow on the underparts and on the tip of the tail.

== Distribution and habitat ==
The Buru golden bulbul is endemic to Buru, an island in the Maluku Islands, an archipelago in eastern Indonesia. A forest bird, it is known to inhabit both pristine and disturbed forests, as well as modified habitats such as plantations and gardens. A common bird on Buru, it is widespread on the island and can be seen up to 1,750 m (5,700 ft).
