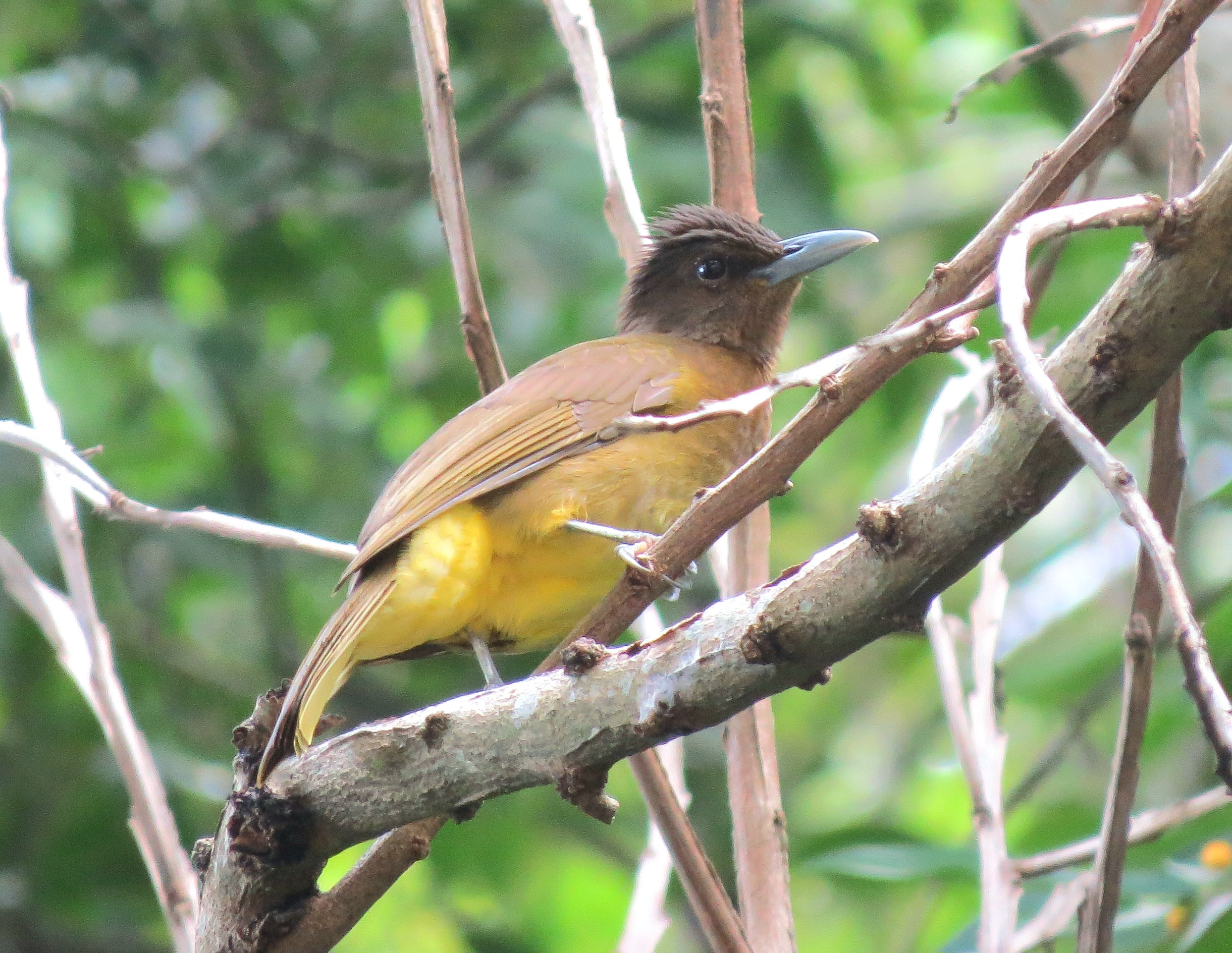

Conservation status
- Near Threatened (IUCN 3.1)

Scientific classification
- Kingdom: Animalia
- Phylum: Chordata
- Class: Aves
- Order: Passeriformes
- Family: Pycnonotidae
- Genus: Hypsipetes
- Species: H. catarmanensis

Binomial name
- Hypsipetes catarmanensis Rand & Rabor, 1969

= Camiguin bulbul =

Species of songbird

The Camiguin bulbul (Hypsipetes catarmanensis) is a species of songbird in the bulbul family, Pycnonotidae. It is endemic to the Philippines being only found on Camiguin.

The Camiguin bulbul was formerly considered a subspecies of the yellowish bulbul (Hypsipetes everetti), but more recent studies have found it to be a distinct species.

== Description ==
It is described as a large, brown bulbul with a yellowish tint. It is differentiated from the yellowish bulbul as it is generally darker and has drabber yellow coloration. Also has a larger bill.

It is differentiated from the formerly conspecific yellowish bulbul by its darker plumage, especially its crown. It also has significantly longer wings and a large bill.

Both males and females are alike in shape and plumage but males are slightly larger.

== Ecology and behavior ==
The diet of the consists of insects and fruit but not much is known about the specifics.

Barely anything is known about this species breeding behaviour. Birds in breeding condition with enlarged gonads collected in June. Otherwise, mating, nest and fledgling stages of this bird are all undescribed.

== Habitat and conservation status ==
This species is only found in lowland forest and secondary growth from 150 to 1,700 meters above sea level.

IUCN has assessed this bird as near threatened. The population is estimated to number 1,000 - 2,499 mature individuals. Despite its limited range, it is said to be locally common in its range and can survive disturbed habitat. Currently, there are no major threats to this species and the population is believed to be stable at the moment although any further destruction to its small range may cause the situation to change.

Conservation actions propose to surveys to monitor population trends and get a better estimate of population size. Investigate whether there may be any potential threats to this species.
