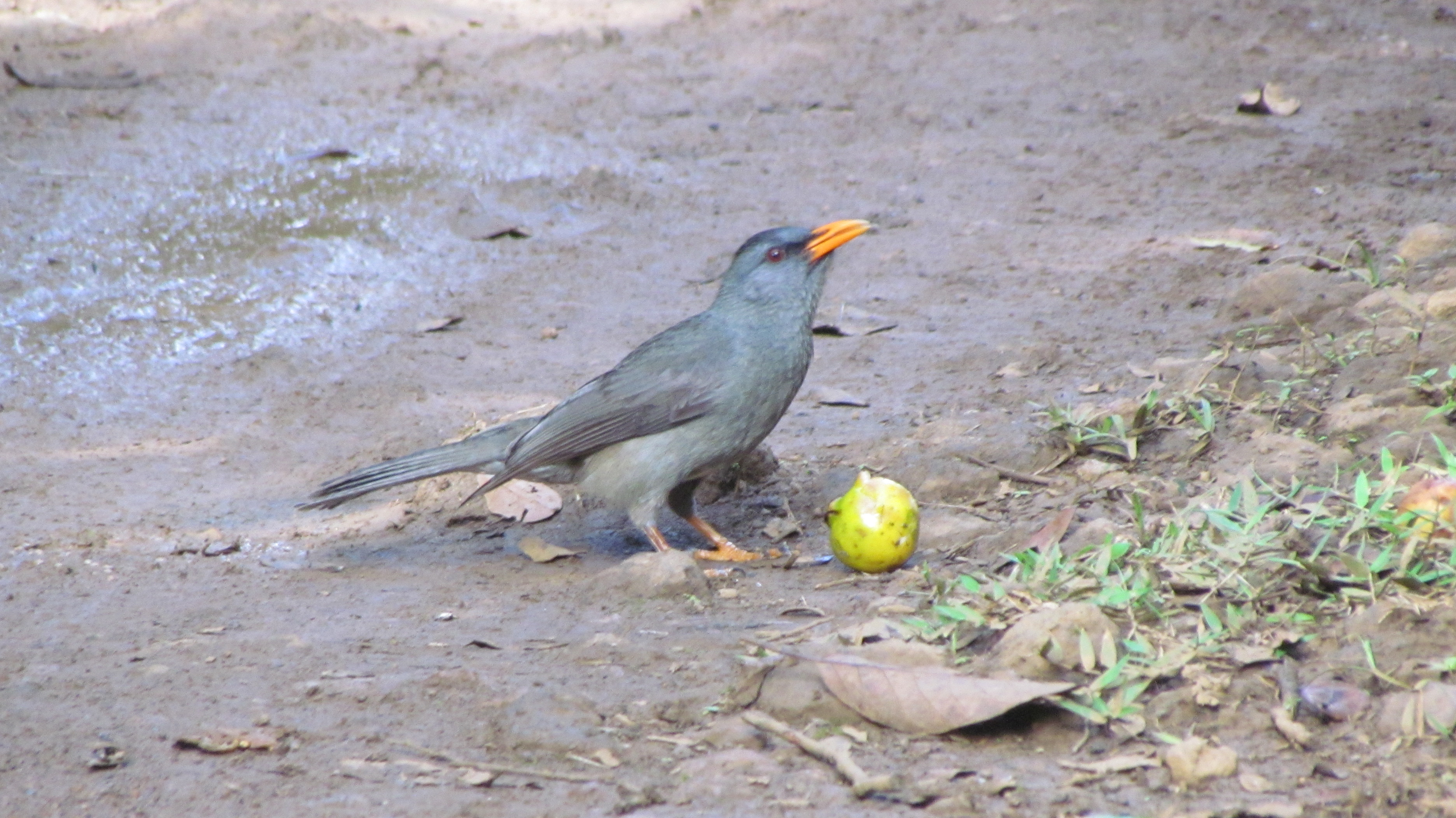

Conservation status
- Vulnerable (IUCN 3.1)

Scientific classification
- Kingdom: Animalia
- Phylum: Chordata
- Class: Aves
- Order: Passeriformes
- Family: Pycnonotidae
- Genus: Hypsipetes
- Species: H. olivaceus

Binomial name
- Hypsipetes olivaceus Jardine & Selby, 1837

Synonyms
- Hypsipetes olivacea Jardine & Selby, 1837; Hypsipetes borbonicus olivaceus; Ixocincla olivacea Blyth 1845; Turdus atricilla Cuvier 1855

= Mauritius bulbul =

Species of bird

The Mauritius bulbul (Hypsipetes olivaceus), is a songbird belonging to the bulbul family, Pycnonotidae. It is endemic to Mauritius.

== Taxonomy and systematics ==
The Mauritius bulbul was the type species of the obsolete genus Ixocincla, which united various more or less closely related bulbuls from the entire Indian Ocean region. Formerly, some authorities considered the Mauritius bulbul to belong to the genus Turdus. It has also been classified as a subspecies of the Réunion bulbul. Alternative names include the Mauritius black bulbul and the Mauritius merle.

== Description ==
The Mauritius bulbul can reach a size up to 24 cm (9.4 in). It is characterized by bright yellow-brown eyes, pink legs, and an orange to yellow-hued bill. Its plumage is generally greyish contrasted with a black crest. The plumage of the juveniles is pale brown. Their bill is blackish.

== Behaviour and ecology ==
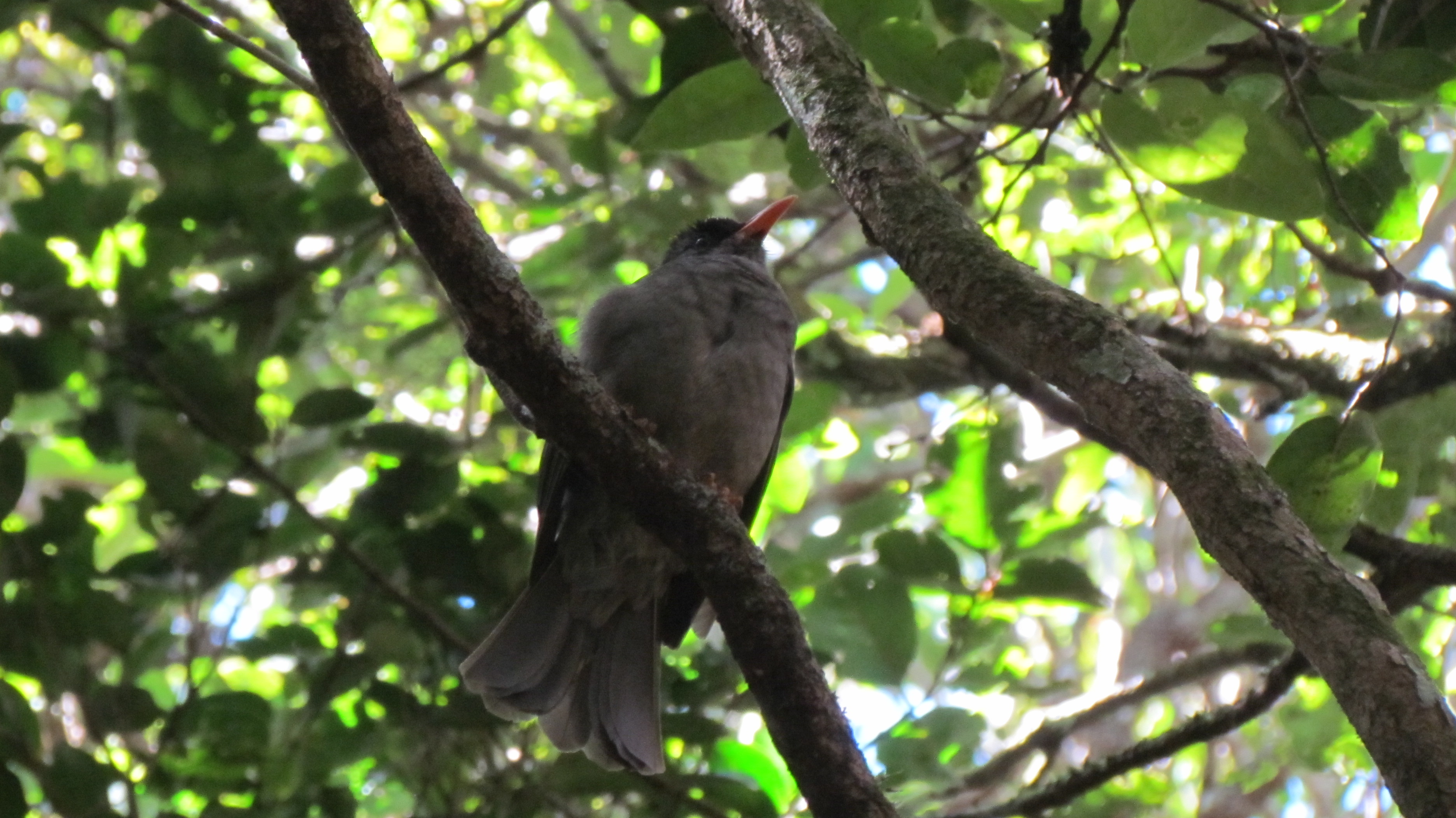
Perched in a tree

=== Breeding ===
During the southern summer, the female lays two pinkish coloured eggs in a nest made from straw and roots. The incubation lasts between 14 and 16 days.

=== Food and feeding ===
The diet of the Mauritius bulbul consists of insects, seeds, and fruits. The ripe berries of the non-native Spanish Flag are especially favoured.

=== Threats ===
In earlier times, it was often served as a dish on festive days. Later, its main threats shifted to the replacement of their forest habitat by tea plantations and invasive weeds (including L. camara, which the birds themselves help to spread) and predation by the introduced crab-eating macaque. In the mid-1970s, only 200 pairs remained, but then the decline was stopped. Today it is rare but has a quite stable population; 280 pairs were counted in 1993.
