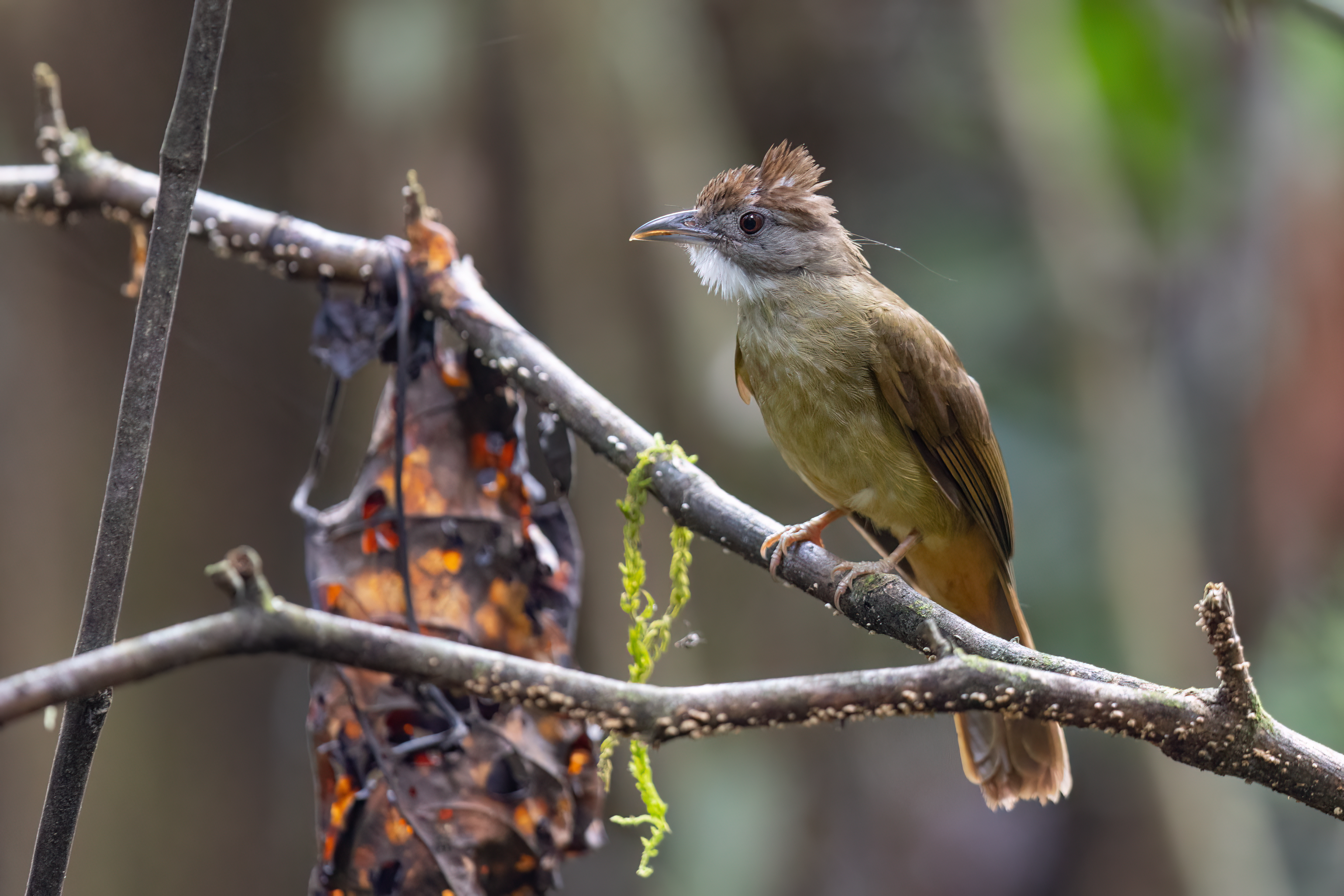

Conservation status
- Least Concern (IUCN 3.1)

Scientific classification
- Kingdom: Animalia
- Phylum: Chordata
- Class: Aves
- Order: Passeriformes
- Family: Pycnonotidae
- Genus: Alophoixus
- Species: A. ruficrissus

Binomial name
- Alophoixus ruficrissus (Sharpe, 1879)

= Penan bulbul =

Species of bird

The Penan bulbul (Alophoixus ruficrissus) is a species of songbird in the bulbul family, Pycnonotidae. It is found in Borneo, typically in the mid-storey of broad-leaved evergreen and rainforests up to 1500 metres elevation.

== Subspecies ==
Three subspecies are recognized:

- A. r. fowleri - (Amadon & Harrisson, 1957): Found in montane areas of Borneo, except Sabah
- A. r. meratusensis - Shakya et al., 2020: Found in mountains of south-eastern Borneo (Kalimantan)
- A. r. ruficrissus - (Sharpe, 1879): Found in mountains of north-eastern Borneo (Sabah)
