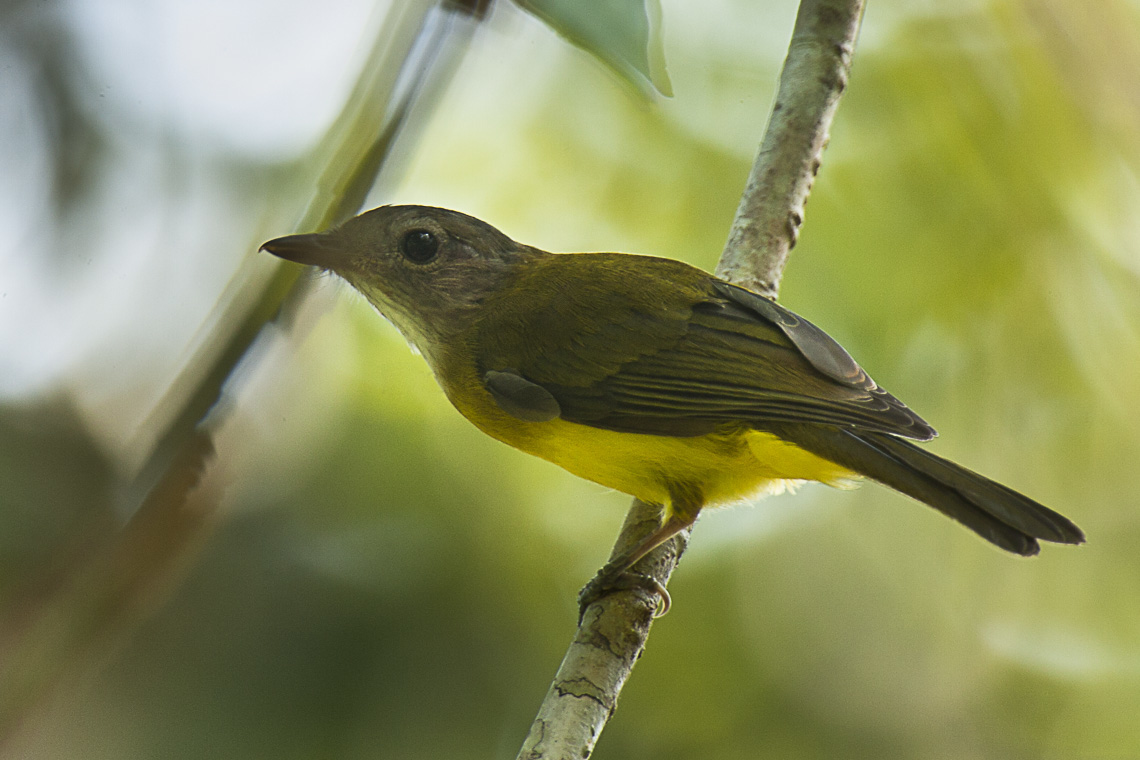

Conservation status
- Least Concern (IUCN 3.1)

Scientific classification
- Kingdom: Animalia
- Phylum: Chordata
- Class: Aves
- Order: Passeriformes
- Family: Pycnonotidae
- Genus: Hypsipetes
- Species: H. everetti

Binomial name
- Hypsipetes everetti (Tweeddale, 1877)
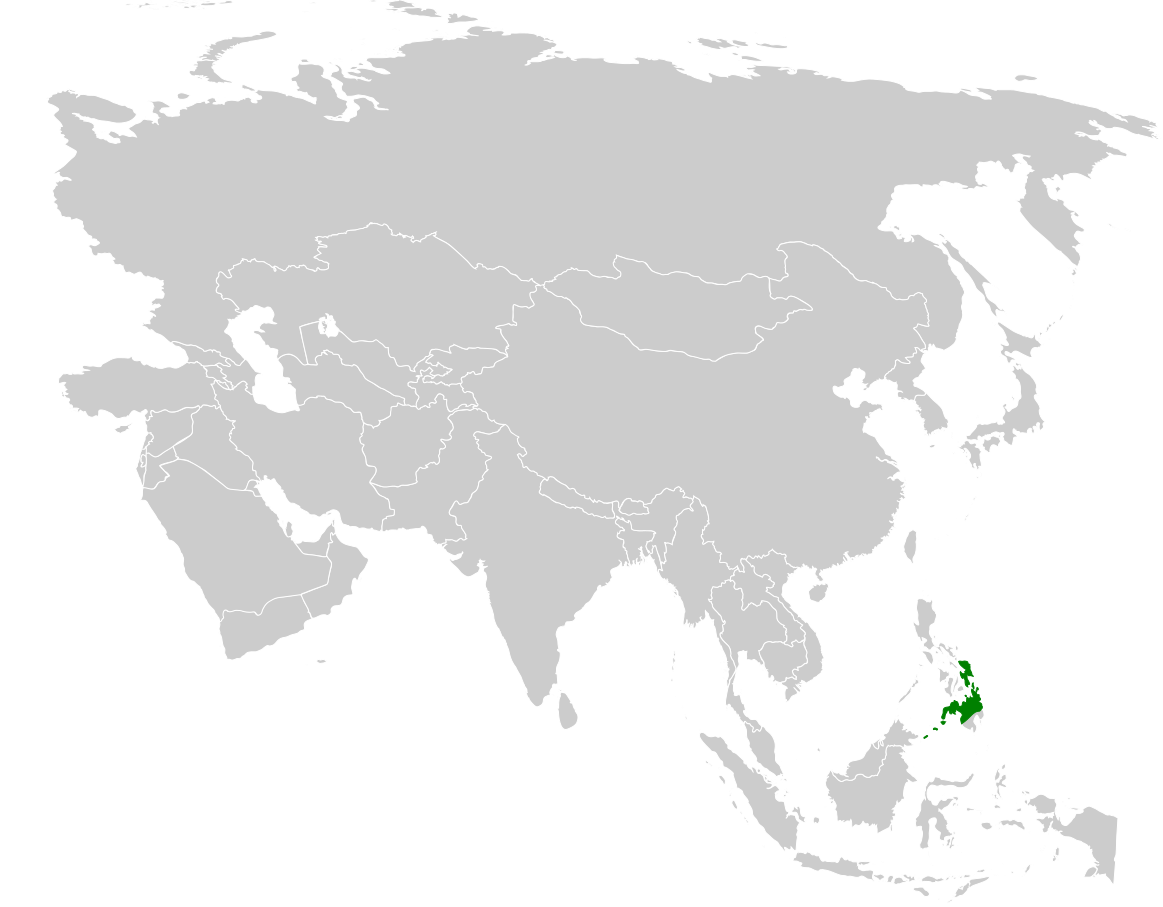

Synonyms
- Criniger Everetti Tweeddale, 1877; Ixos everetti (Tweeddale, 1877)

= Yellowish bulbul =

Species of songbird

The yellowish bulbul (Hypsipetes everetti) is a species of songbird in the bulbul family, Pycnonotidae. It is endemic to the Philippines found only on East Visayas, Mindanao and the Sulu Archipelago. The birds of the Sulu archipelago are sometimes considered a separate species called the Sulu bulbul. This species is declining due to habitat loss.

== Description and taxonomy ==
The Camiguin bulbul (H. catarmanensis) of Camiguin Sur was formerly considered a subspecies, but more recent studies have found it to be a distinct species The yellowish bulbul is differentiated by its olive green cap, lighter plummage, smaller size and through its call.

=== Subspecies ===
Two subspecies are currently recognized:

- H. e. everetti – (Tweeddale, 1877): Found in east-central and south-eastern Philippines
- Sulu bulbul (H. e. haynaldi) – (Blasius, W, 1890): Originally described as a separate species in the genus Criniger. Found in the Sulu Archipelago (south-western Philippines)

== Ecology and behavior ==
The diet of the consists of insects and fruit but not much is known about the specifics. Seen in small groups or joins mixed flocks with other forest birds.

Barely anything is known about this species breeding behaviour. Birds in breeding condition with enlarged gonads collected in April to August. Otherwise, mating, nest and fledgling stages of this bird are all undescribed.

== Habitat and conservation status ==
It is found in tropical moist lowland forest up to 1,000 meters above sea level.

The International Union for Conservation of Nature recognizes the Yellowish bulbul as two separate species. It lists the Yellowish bulbul as Least-concern species as it remains common throughout most of its range across Mindanao and East Visayas. Occurs in a few protected areas like Samar Island Natural Park, Mount Apo and Mount Kitanglad but actual protection and enforcement from illegal logging and hunting are lax.

The Sulu bulbul is assessed as Near-threatened species due it is relatively small range. The islands on the Sulu Archipelago have mostly been deforested.
