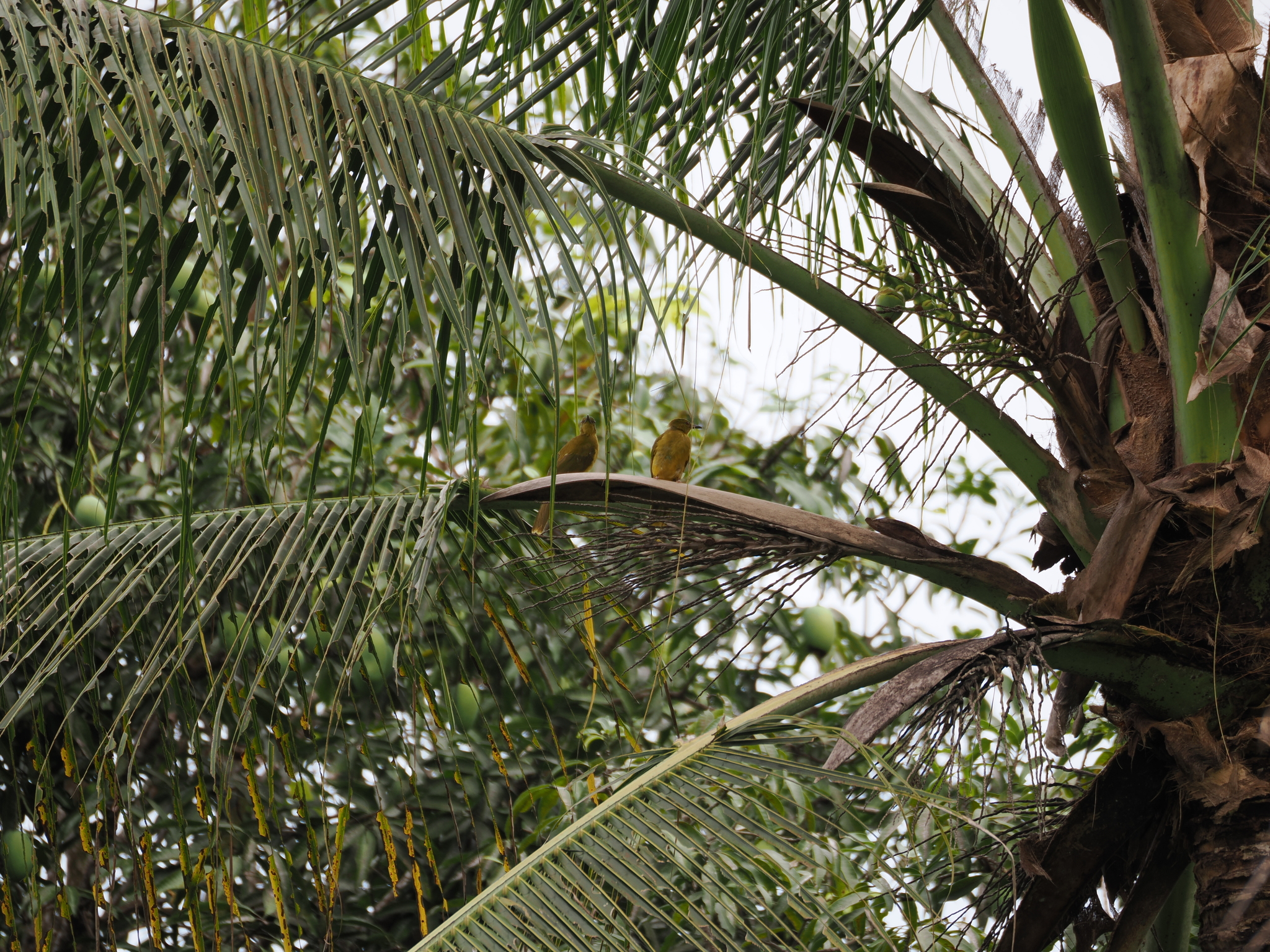

Conservation status
- Least Concern (IUCN 3.1)

Scientific classification
- Kingdom: Animalia
- Phylum: Chordata
- Class: Aves
- Order: Passeriformes
- Family: Pycnonotidae
- Genus: Hypsipetes
- Species: H. harterti

Binomial name
- Hypsipetes harterti (Stresemann, 1912)

= Banggai golden bulbul =

Species of songbird

The Banggai golden bulbul (Hypsipetes harterti) is a species of passerine bird in the bulbul family Pycnonotidae. It is endemic to Banggai Island in Indonesia. Its natural habitat is subtropical or tropical moist lowland forests.

== Taxonomy ==
The Banggai golden bulbul was originally classified in the genus Criniger, and has also been previously been placed in the genera Thapsinillas and Alophoixus. It is one of nine species in the golden bulbul complex, a group of closely-related bulbuls found in Indonesia that were all formerly considered to be subspecies of a single, wide-ranging Hypsipetes affinis (now restricted to the Seram golden bulbul). Beginning in the 2000s, these species were gradually split on the basis of genetic, morphological, and vocal evidence supporting their placement as distinct species. The Banggai golden bulbul was separated as a distinct species in 2013 on the basis of morphological and vocal differences with other species. It is especially similar to the Sula golden bulbul, but differs slightly from that species in its appearance. The two species also have markedly distinct vocalizations.

== Description ==
A large, long-billed, and short-legged species of bulbul, the Banggai golden bulbul grows to an average length of 23–24 cm (9.1–9.4 in). It is largely olive-green in colour, with a yellow throat and yellow underside of the tail.

== Distribution and habitat ==
The Banggai golden bulbul is endemic to the Banggai Islands, an archipelago in eastern Indonesia located off the eastern coast of Sulawesi. The species is known from the islands of Banda, Lalobo, and Peleng and can be seen at elevations of up to 900 m (3,000 ft). A forest bird, it is known to inhabit both pristine and disturbed forests, as well as modified habitats such as plantations.
