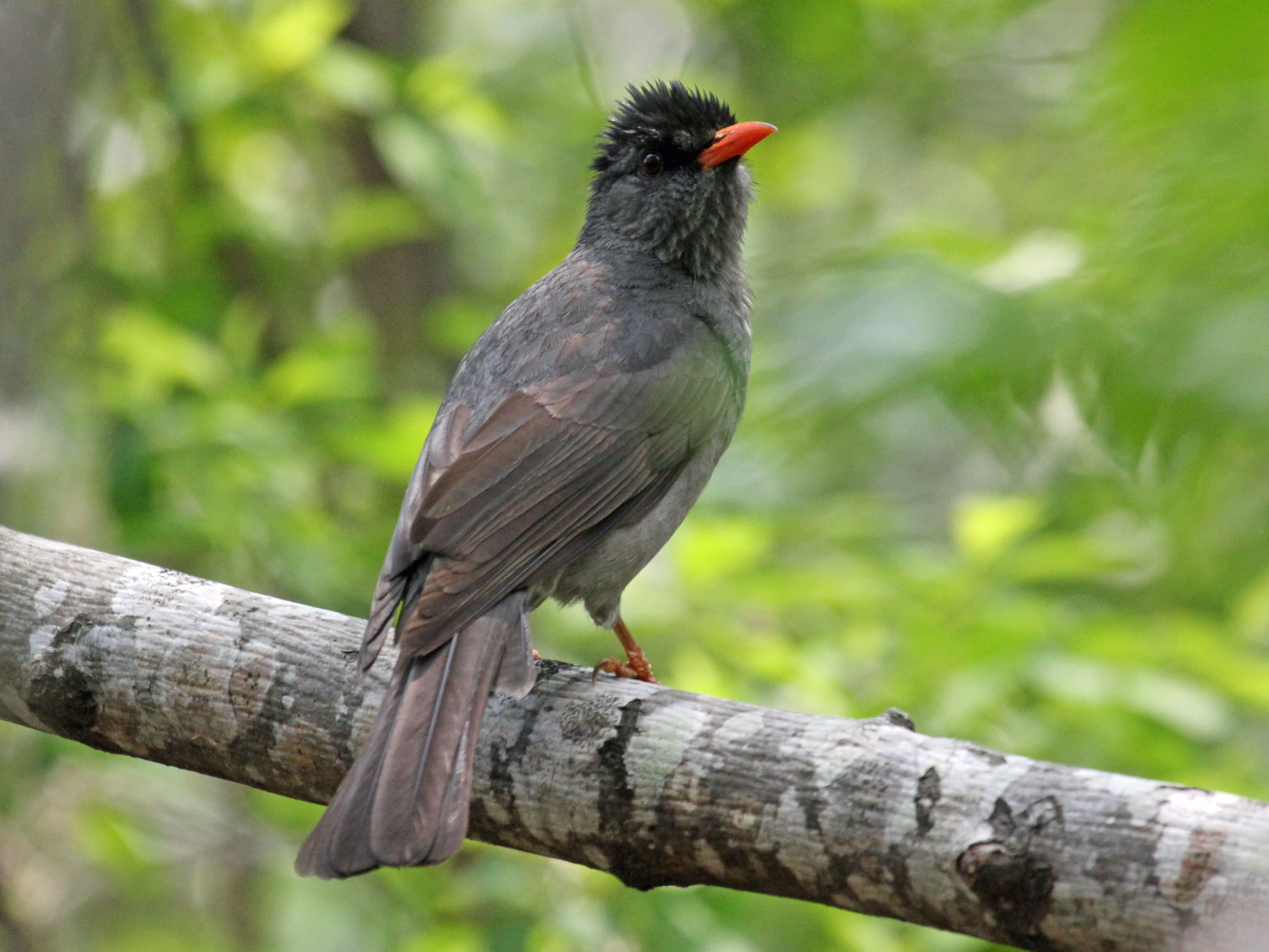

Conservation status
- Least Concern (IUCN 3.1)

Scientific classification
- Kingdom: Animalia
- Phylum: Chordata
- Class: Aves
- Order: Passeriformes
- Family: Pycnonotidae
- Genus: Hypsipetes
- Species: H. madagascariensis

Binomial name
- Hypsipetes madagascariensis (Statius Müller, 1776)
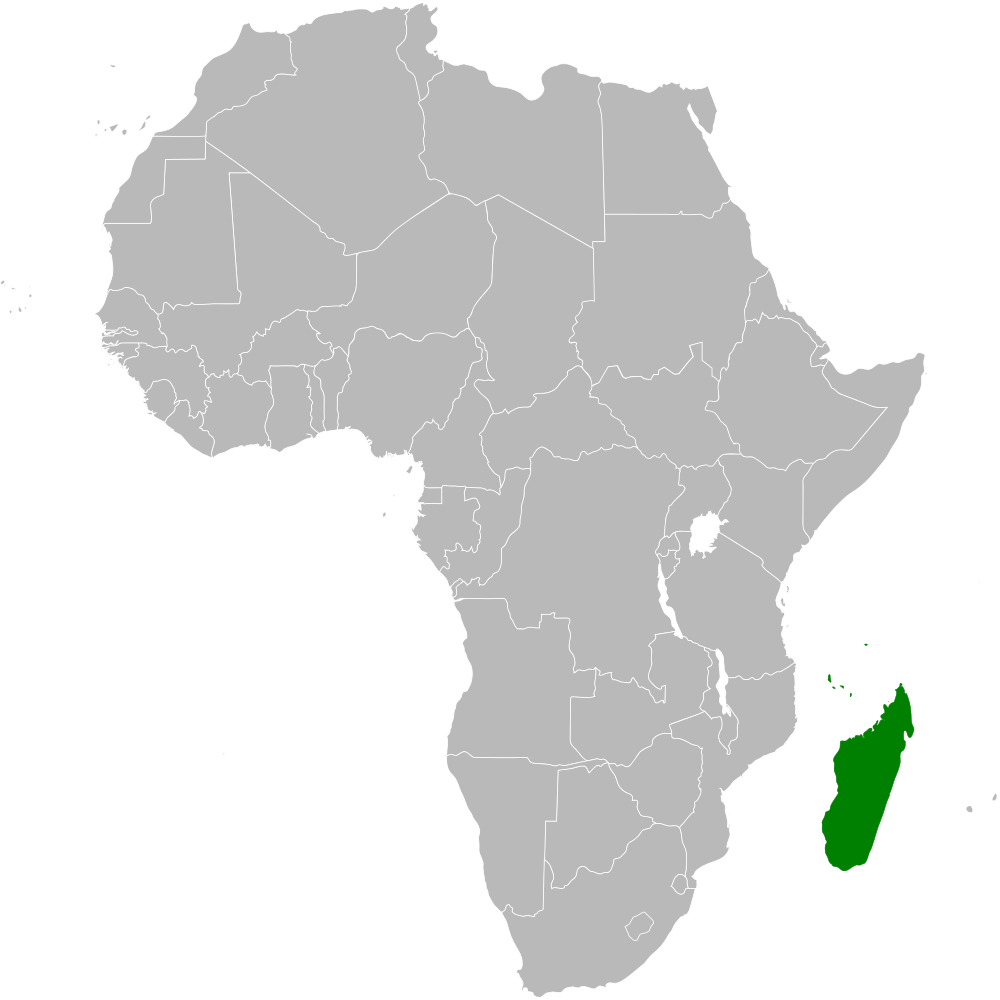

Synonyms
- Turdus Madagascariensis Statius Müller, 1776; Ixocincla madagascariensis Gray, G.R., 1869

= Malagasy bulbul =

Species of songbird

The Malagasy bulbul (Hypsipetes madagascariensis) is a species of songbird in the bulbul family, Pycnonotidae. It is found on Madagascar and other regional islands in the south-western Indian Ocean.

== Taxonomy and systematics ==
The Malagasy bulbul was originally described in the genus Turdus. Alternative names for the Malagasy bulbul include the black bulbul, Madagascar black bulbul, and Madagascar bulbul. The alternate name 'black bulbul' should not be confused with the species of the same name, Hypsipetes leucocephalus, with which it was formerly considered as conspecific.

=== Subspecies ===
Three subspecies are currently recognized:

- H. m. madagascariensis - (Statius Müller, 1776): Found on Madagascar and the Comoro Islands
- H. m. grotei - (Friedmann, 1929): Found on the Glorioso Islands
- H. m. rostratus - (Ridgway, 1893): Found on Aldabra atoll

== Gallery ==
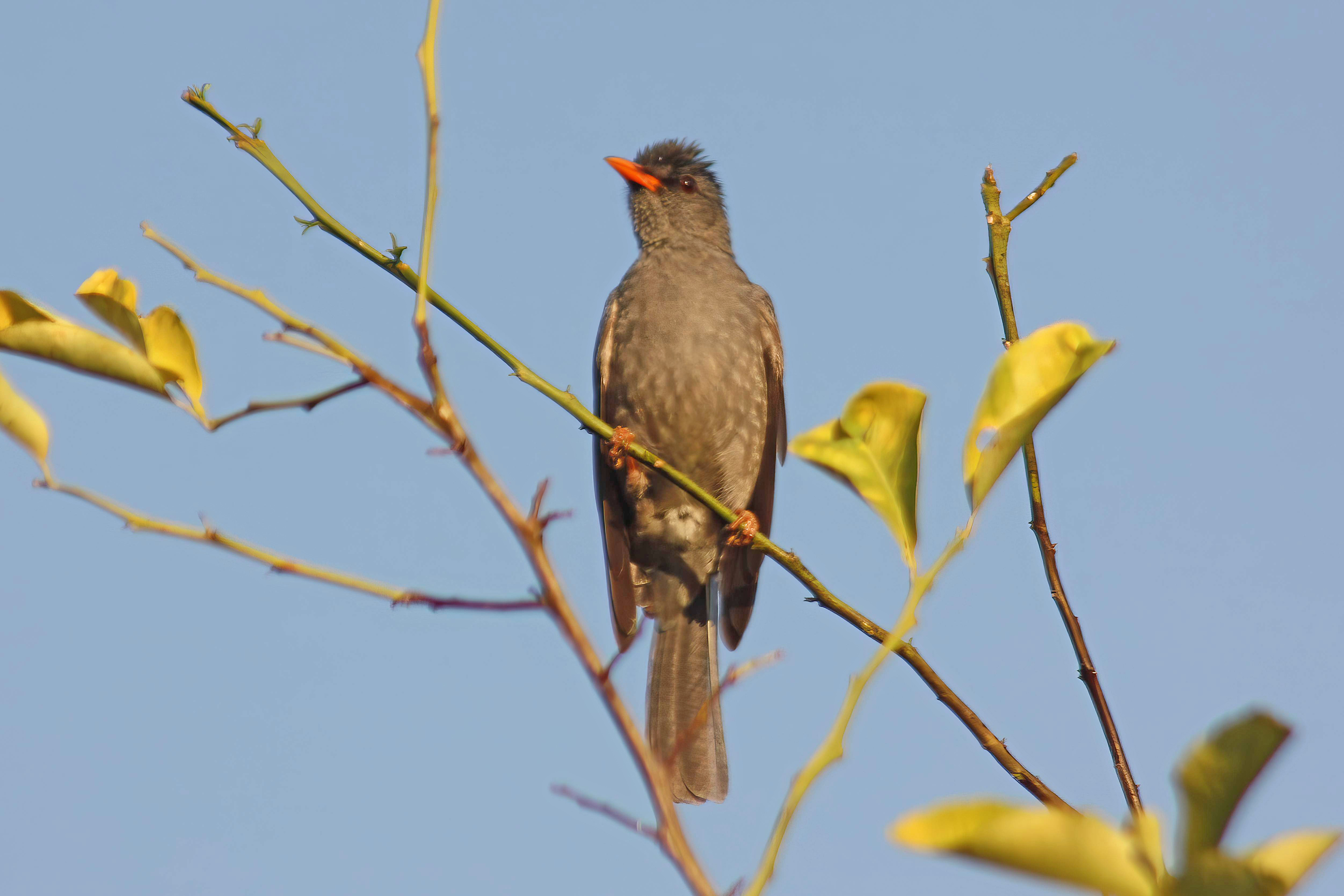
Hypsipetes madagascariensis in the Anjajavy Forest

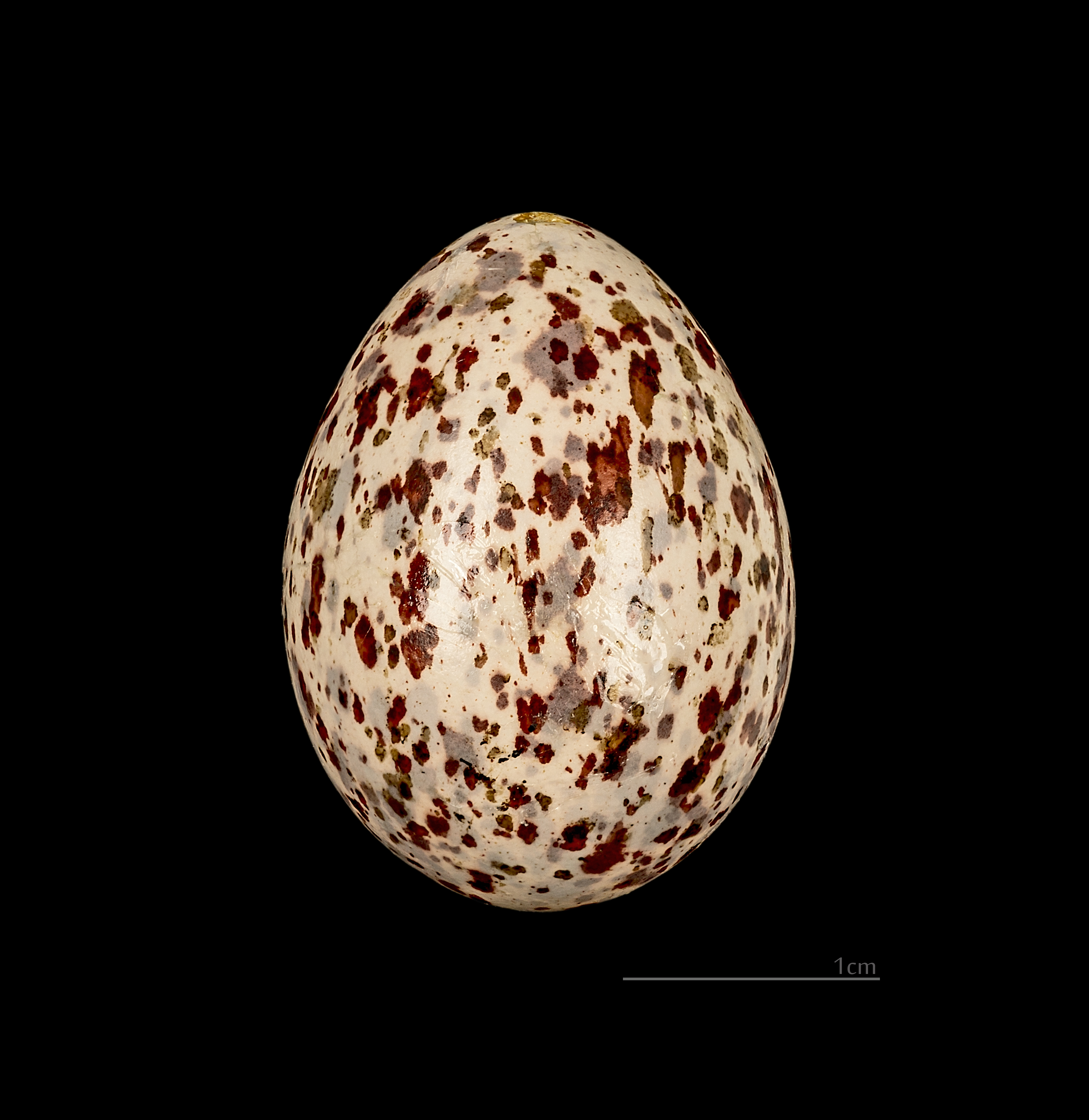
Egg of Hypsipetes madagascariensis MHNT
