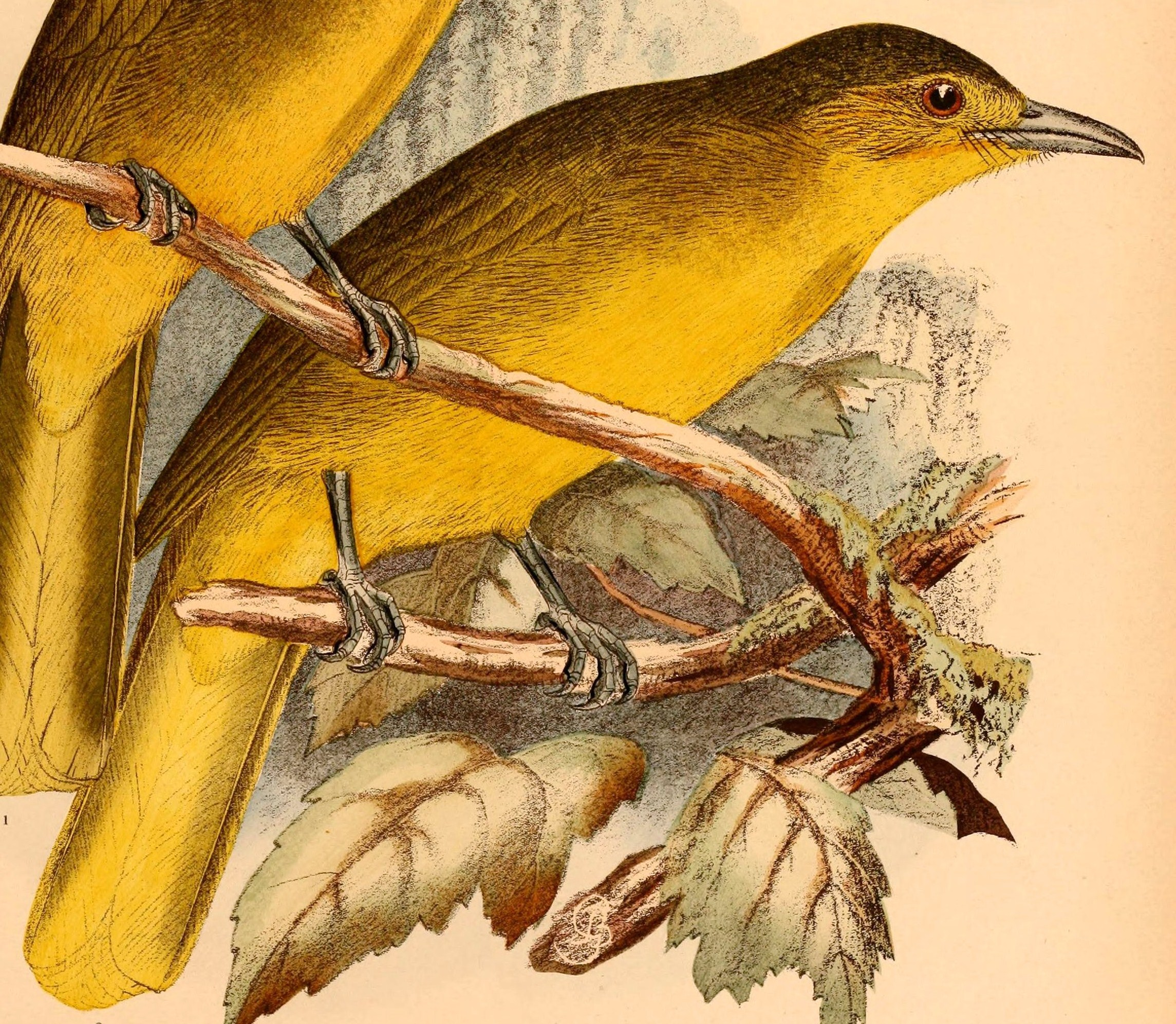
- Specimen image

Conservation status
- Critically Endangered (IUCN 3.1)

Scientific classification
- Kingdom: Animalia
- Phylum: Chordata
- Class: Aves
- Order: Passeriformes
- Family: Pycnonotidae
- Genus: Hypsipetes
- Species: H. platenae

Binomial name
- Hypsipetes platenae (Blasius, W, 1888)

= Sangihe golden bulbul =

Species of songbird

The Sangihe golden bulbul (Hypsipetes platenae) is a species of passerine bird in the bulbul family Pycnonotidae. It is endemic to the Sangihe Islands which lie northeast of Sulawesi in Indonesia. Its natural habitat is subtropical or tropical moist lowland forests.

== Taxonomy ==
The Sangihe golden bulbul was formally described in 1888 by the German ornithologist Wilhelm Blasius from a specimen collected by Margarete and Carl Platen on Sangir Island, north of Sulawesi in Indonesia. Blaisius placed the species in the genus Criniger and coined the binomial name Criniger platenae. The specific epithet was chosen to honour the Platens. By publishing scientific names in a daily newspaper, the Braunschweigische Anzeiger, Blasius was able to get his new names in print before his main rival Richard Bowdler Sharpe. This bulbul is now placed in the genus Hypsipetes that was introduced in 1831 by Nicholas Vigors. The species has also been previously been placed in the genera Thapsinillas and Alophoixus.

The Sangihe golden bulbul is one of nine species in the golden bulbul complex, a group of closely-related bulbuls found in Indonesia that were all formerly considered to be subspecies of a single, wide-ranging Hypsipetes affinis (now restricted to the Seram golden bulbul). Beginning in the 2000s, these species were gradually split on the basis of genetic, morphological, and vocal evidence supporting their placement as distinct species. The Sangihe golden bulbul was separated as a distinct species in 2013 on the basis of morphological and vocal differences with other species.

== Description ==
A large, long-billed species of bulbul, the Sangihe golden bulbul grows to an average length of 21–22 cm (8.3–8.7 in). It is largely olive in colour, with the exception of its bright yellow face and throat. The bases of its tail feathers are also yellow.

== Distribution and habitat ==
The Sangihe golden bulbul is endemic to the island of Sangir, the largest island in the Sangihe archipelago off the northeastern coast of Sulawesi. It is restricted to undisturbed broadleaf evergreen forest at elevations of up to 900 m (3,000 ft) and does not inhabit secondary forests or mixed plantations. Surveys since the 1990s suggest that it is currently only found in the vicinity of Mount Sahendaruman.
