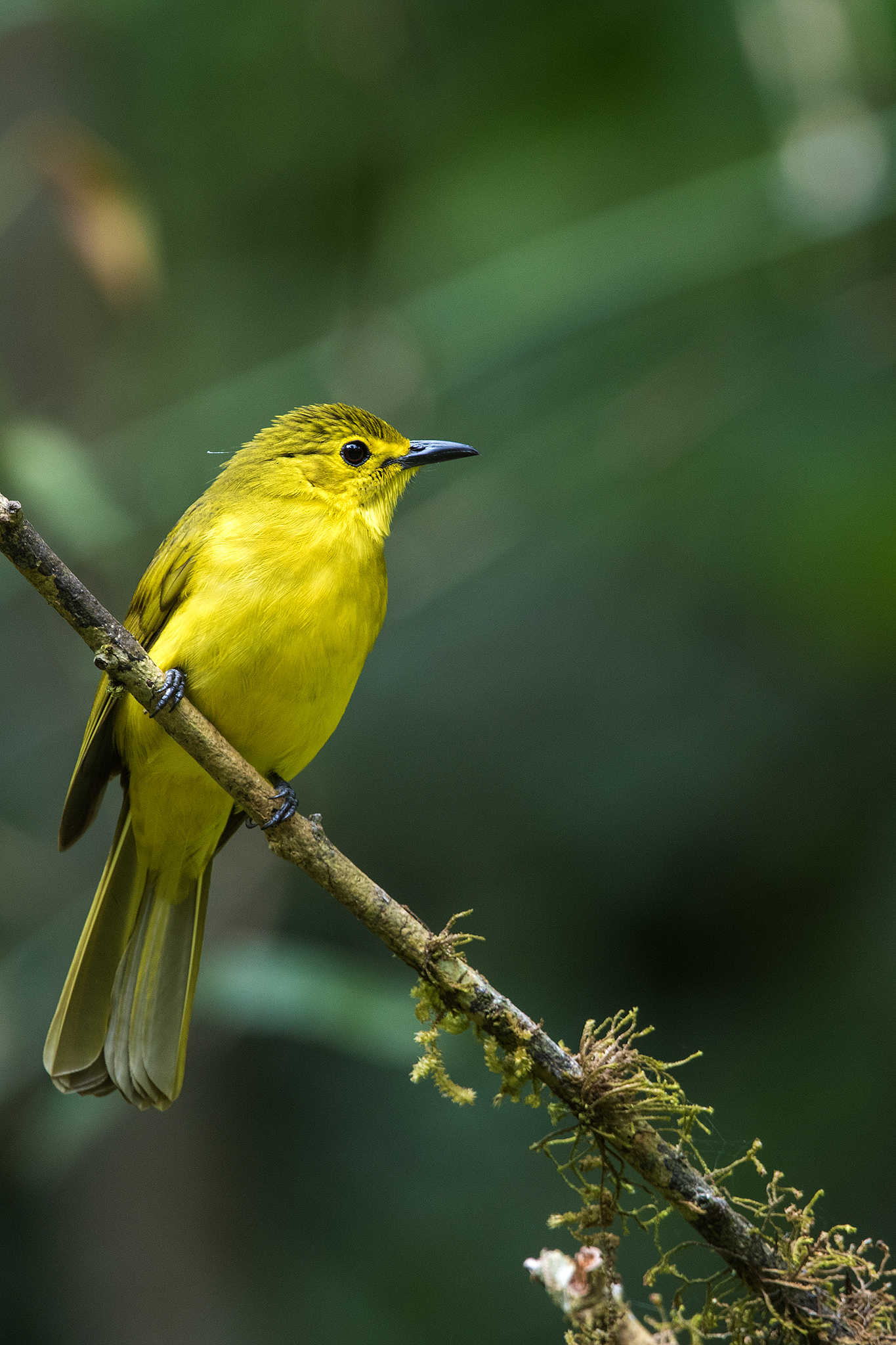

Conservation status
- Least Concern (IUCN 3.1)

Scientific classification
- Kingdom: Animalia
- Phylum: Chordata
- Class: Aves
- Order: Passeriformes
- Family: Pycnonotidae
- Genus: Acritillas; Oberholser, 1905
- Species: A. indica

Binomial name
- Acritillas indica (Jerdon, 1839)
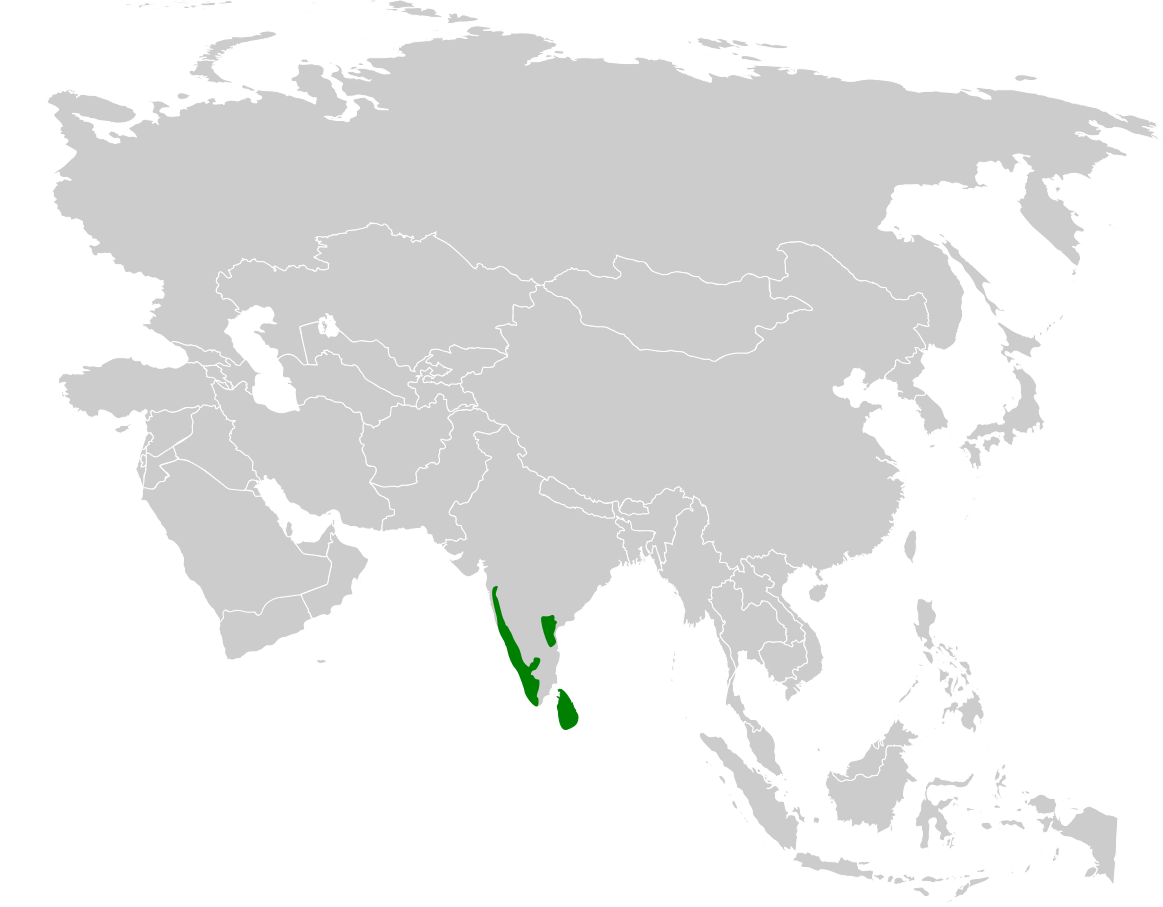

Synonyms
- Hypsipetes indica; Hypsipetes indicus; Iole indica; Trichophorus indicus

Audio
- Calls

= Yellow-browed bulbul =

Species of bird

The yellow-browed bulbul (Acritillas indica), or golden-browed bulbul, is a species of songbird in the bulbul family, Pycnonotidae. It is found in the forests of southern India and Sri Lanka. The yellow-browed bulbul is mainly yellow on the underside and olive above with a distinct yellow brow. They are easily located by their loud calls but tend to skulk within foliage below the forest canopy. While its taxonomic classification has changed over time, it is currently the sole species within the monotypic genus Acritillas, which is closely related to Hemixos.

== Taxonomy and systematics ==
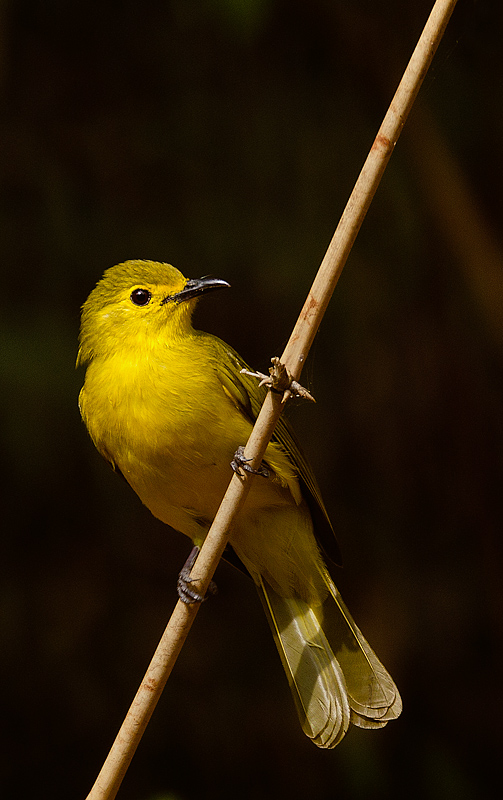
A. i. icterica at Dandeli, India

- - - - - - - - Hypsipetes
            - - Acritillas
              - Hemixos
          - Ixos
        - Alcurus
      - Iole
    - Alophoixus
  - Tricholestes

Evolutionary relationships based on Fuchs et al., 2018.

The yellow-browed bulbul was originally described in the genus Trichophorus (a synonym for Criniger) in 1839 by T. C. Jerdon on the basis of specimens from the Wynaad region and given the original binomial (protonym) of Trichophorus indicus. Formerly, the yellow-browed bulbul was classified in the genus Iole as two separate species, but a study determined that this species is exceptional and it is now placed in the monotypic genus Acritillas. Some authorities have included the yellow-browed bulbul in the genus Hypsipetes but a 2018 molecular phylogenetic study indicated the nearest living relative as Hemixos flavala.

=== Subspecies ===
Three subspecies are currently recognised:

- A. i. icterica - (Strickland, 1844): originally described as a separate species in the genus Criniger from a specimen from Satara, Maharashtra. The upperparts are more greyish green and the yellow a bit duller; it is found in the northern Western Ghats population, but intergrades with A. i. indica in the Londa area.
- A. i. indica - (Jerdon, 1839): found in the Western Ghats and Nilgiris of India, northern and eastern Sri Lanka. This has the yellow brighter than in A. i. icterica.
- A. i. guglielmi - (Ripley, 1946): found in south-western Sri Lanka. Has more greenish plumage, with the underparts tinged green unlike the bronzy tinge of A. i. indica.

== Description ==
This bulbul is about 20 cm (7.9 in) long, lacks a crest and has the upperparts olive-green with a prominent yellow brow and goggle with the underparts being all yellow. The sexes do not differ in plumage. The bill is black and the iris is reddish brown. The population in the northern Western Ghats (A. i. icterica) is paler yellow than the populations further south (A. i. indica). A somewhat disjunct population is found in the Eastern Ghats. In Sri Lanka, southwestern populations (A. i. gugliemi) are greener, while the northern populations are included in the nominate subspecies.

A. i. guglielmi near Sinharaja, showing greenish tinge on underside

The calls include a whistle-like call and sharp pick-wick notes.

== Distribution and habitat ==
The yellow-browed bulbul has been considered as the wet-zone counterpart of the dry-zone white-browed bulbul. It is found mainly below the forest canopy of the hill forests and plantations in the Western Ghats and Sri Lanka. They also occur in parts of the Eastern Ghats including the Kolli hills, Nallamalas and parts of Tirupathi and Mamandur regions in Andhra Pradesh.

== Behaviour and ecology ==
Yellow-browed bulbuls are found in pairs or small groups and call loudly. They feed mainly on berries and insects. The breeding season is during the dry spell before the monsoons, mainly January to May. The nest is a cup built in a low fork covered with moss and cobwebs on the outside, giving the appearance of a large white-eye nest, and lined with fine root fibres. The typical clutch size in India is three eggs and in Sri Lanka two. A study of 153 nests in Silent Valley National Park of India found 92% of nests had two eggs. Peak breeding in the Silent Valley National Park of Kerala was found in January and February. About a week is taken for building the nest and the eggs are incubated for about 13 days. The eggs are pale pink or white with reddish brown speckling. The eggs hatch synchronously and the nestlings fledge after about 13 days. Nestlings are fed with caterpillars, soft insects and berries.
