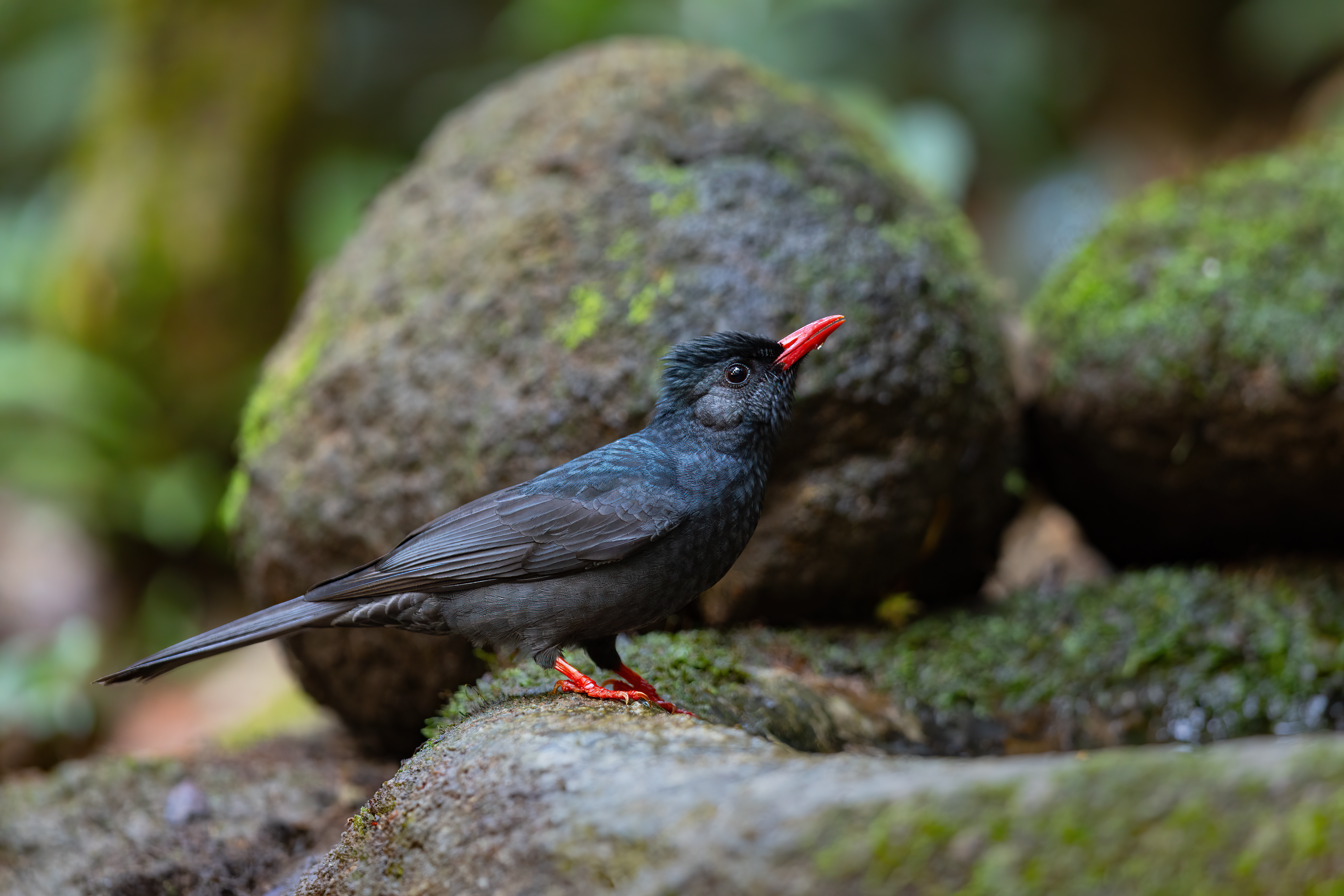
- Hypsipetes leucocephalus concolor, southern Vietnam

Conservation status
- Least Concern (IUCN 3.1)

Scientific classification
- Kingdom: Animalia
- Phylum: Chordata
- Class: Aves
- Order: Passeriformes
- Family: Pycnonotidae
- Genus: Hypsipetes
- Species: H. leucocephalus

Binomial name
- Hypsipetes leucocephalus (Gmelin, JF, 1789)

Synonyms
- Turdus leucocephalus Gmelin, JF, 1789; Hypsipetes madagascariensis; Hypsipetes madagascariensis leucocephalus; Microscelis leucocephalus

= Black bulbul =

Species of bird

The black bulbul (Hypsipetes leucocephalus), also known as the Himalayan black bulbul or Asian black bulbul, is a member of the bulbul family of passerine birds. It is found primarily in the Himalayas, its range stretching from Pakistan eastward to Southeast Asia. It is the type species of the genus Hypsipetes, established by Nicholas Aylward Vigors in the early 1830s. There are a number of subspecies, mostly varying in the shade of the body plumage which ranges from grey to black, and some also occur in white-headed morphs, as also suggested by its specific epithet leucocephalus, literally "white head". The legs and bill are always rich orange-red.

== Taxonomy and systematics ==
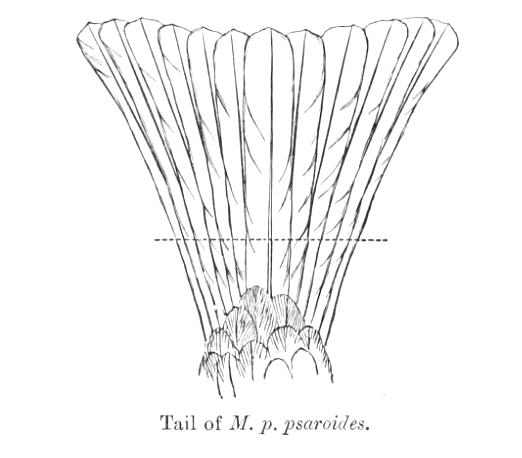
The tail of H. l. psaroides has a gentle curve in the outer tail feathers and a shallow fork

The black bulbul was formally described in 1789 by the German naturalist Johann Friedrich Gmelin in his revised and expanded edition of Carl Linnaeus's Systema Naturae. He placed it with the thrushes in the genus Turdus and coined the binomial name Turdus leucocephalus. Gmelin based his account on "Le Merle Dominiquain de la Chine", a white-headed morph from China that had been described in 1782 by the French naturalist Pierre Sonnerat. The type locality was subsequently restricted to Guangzhou (formerly Canton) in China. The black bulbul is now one of 19 species placed in the genus Hypsipetes that was introduced in 1831 by the Irish zoologist Nicholas Vigors. The genus name combines the Ancient Greek hupsi meaning "high" with petēs meaning "-flyer". The specific epithet leucocephalus is from Ancient Greek leukokephalos meaning "white-headed" (from leukos "white" and -kephalos "-headed"). The black bulbul was formerly considered to be conspecific with the Malagasy bulbul. The common name "black bulbul" is also used as an alternate name for the Malagasy bulbul. Formerly, the square-tailed bulbul was also classified as two subspecies of the black bulbul.

=== Subspecies ===
Ten subspecies are currently recognized, although the reproductive isolation mechanisms such as vocalization and geographic distributions of these populations still remain to be studied:

- H. l. psaroides - Vigors, 1831: Originally described as a separate species. Found along the Himalayas from the Kunar Valley (north-eastern Afghanistan) and northern Pakistan through Arunachal Pradesh (northern India) and the central Himalayas to north-western Myanmar
- Assam black bulbul (H. l. nigrescens) - Baker, ECS, 1917: Found in Assam and Manipur (north-eastern India), and the Chin Hills (western Myanmar)
- Burmese black bulbul (H. l. concolor) - Blyth, 1849: Originally described as a separate species. Found from eastern Myanmar and southern Yunnan (southern China) through Indochina
- H. l. ambiens - (Mayr, 1942): Found in north-eastern Myanmar and western Yunnan (southern China)
- H. l. sinensis - (La Touche, 1922): Found in northern Yunnan (southern China)
- H. l. stresemanni - (Mayr, 1942): Members of this race have white heads. Found in central Yunnan (southern China)
- H. l. leucothorax - (Mayr, 1942): Members of this race have white heads. Found in central China
- H. l. leucocephalus - (Gmelin, JF, 1789): Members of this race have white heads. Found in south-eastern China
- H. l. nigerrimus - (Gould, 1863): Originally described as a separate species. Found in Taiwan
- H. l. perniger - Swinhoe, 1870: Originally described as a separate species. Found on Hainan Island (off south-eastern China)
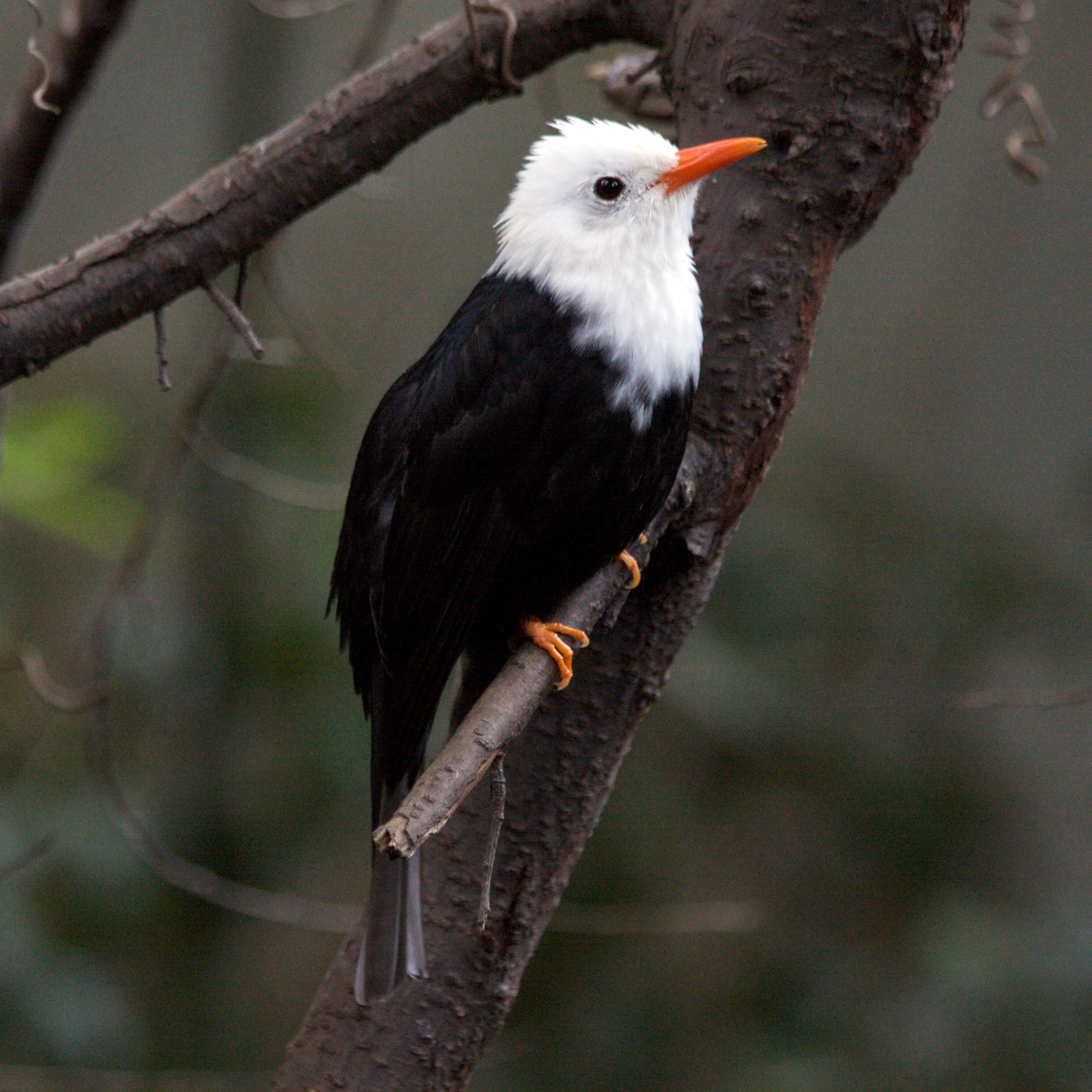
nominate subspecies in a zoo

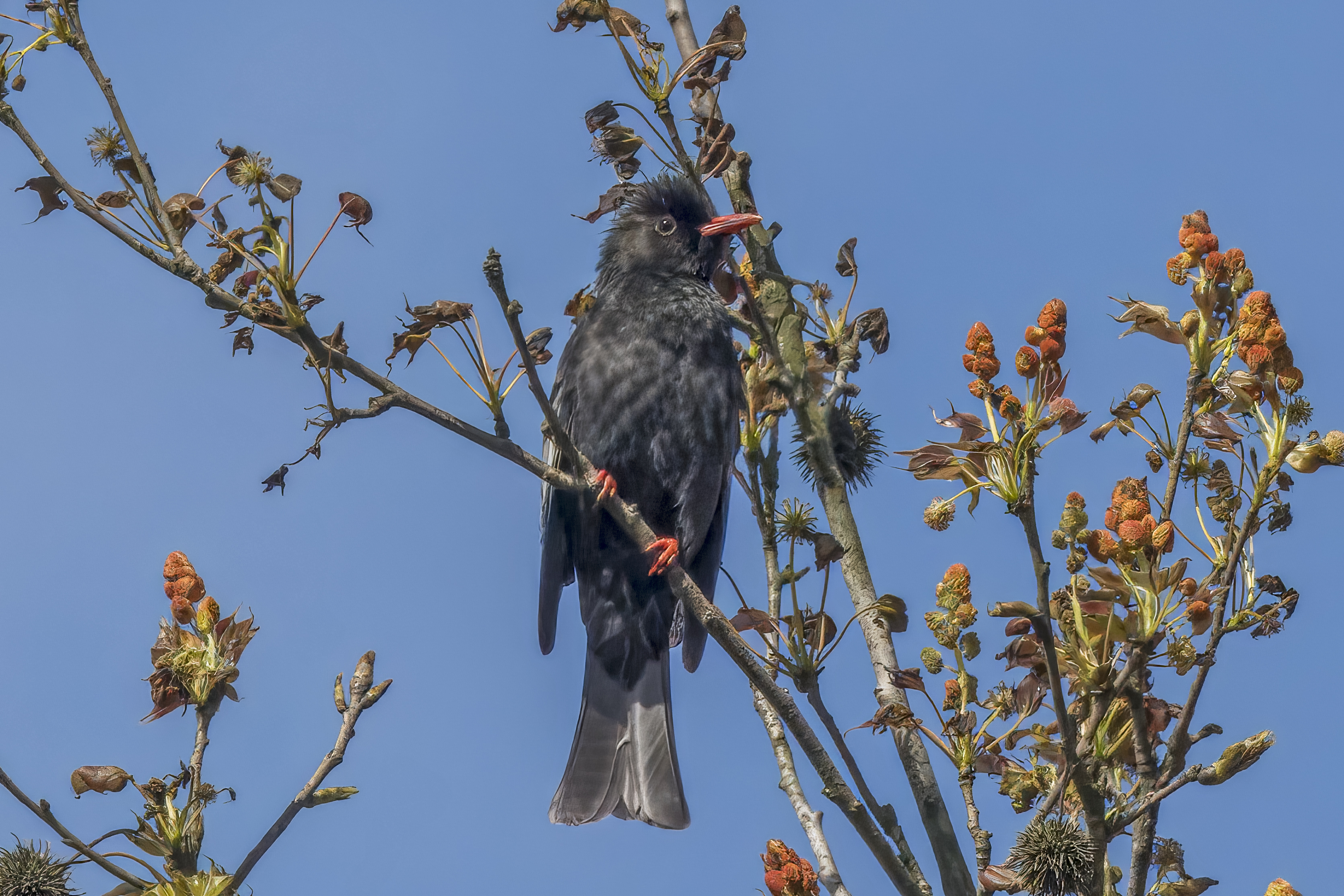
H. l. nigerrimus, Taiwan

== Description ==
The black bulbul is 24–25 cm (9.4–9.8 in) in length, with a long tail. The body plumage ranges from slate grey to shimmering black, depending on the race. The beak, legs, and feet are all orange and the head has a black fluffy crest. Sexes are similar in plumage, but young birds lack the crest, have whitish underparts with a grey breast band, and have a brown tint to the upperparts. They have a black streak behind the eye and on the ear coverts. Although males and females are indistinguishable to the human eye, there are significant differences in the ultraviolet reflectivity of the plumage making them readily distinguishable to the bulbuls themselves.

=== Vocalisations ===
They can be quite noisy, making various loud cheeping, mewing and grating calls. The Himalayan form has been reported to make a call resembling a goat kid, throwing back its neck when calling.

== Distribution and habitat ==
This bulbul is found in broad-leaved forests, cultivation and gardens mainly in hilly areas, but Himalayan populations are known to sometimes descend into the adjoining plains in winter.

=== Breeding ===
It builds its nest in a tree or bush; the nest is a cup placed in a fork and made from grasses, dry leaves, mosses, lichens and cobwebs. The lining is made up of ferns, rootlets and other soft material. Both sexes participate in nest construction. Two or three eggs form the usual clutch.

=== Food and feeding ===
Black bulbuls feed mainly on seeds and insects, and they are often seen in small groups, either roosting or flying about in search of food. They are particularly fond of berries. They are known to feed on a wide range of berries including Celtis, Rosa, Melia and Ehretia in the Himalayas. They feed on the nectar of Salmalia, Erythrina, Rhododendron and other species. They make aerial sallies for insects.

== Mythology ==
The red-billed black bulbul is promenently featured in Formosan mythology. For example, some Bunun, Kankanavu, Paiwan and Pazeh deluge texts credit the bulbul with donating fire and millet to the survivors of the global flood.
