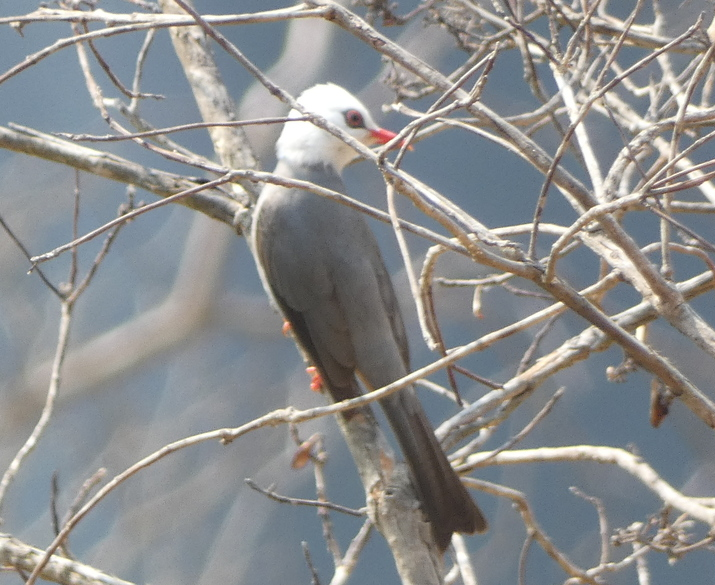

Conservation status
- Least Concern (IUCN 3.1)

Scientific classification
- Kingdom: Animalia
- Phylum: Chordata
- Class: Aves
- Order: Passeriformes
- Family: Pycnonotidae
- Genus: Hypsipetes
- Species: H. thompsoni

Binomial name
- Hypsipetes thompsoni (Bingham, 1900)

Synonyms
- Cerasophila thompsoni Bingham, 1900; Hypsipetes thompsoni Bingham, 1900

= White-headed bulbul =

Species of bird

The white-headed bulbul (Hypsipetes thompsoni) is a songbird species in the bulbul family, Pycnonotidae.

It is found in Myanmar and north-western Thailand. Its natural habitats are subtropical or tropical moist lowland forest and subtropical or tropical moist montane forest. It is not considered a threatened species by the IUCN.

== Taxonomy and systematics ==
The white-headed bulbul was previously placed in the monotypic genus Cerasophila (literally meaning "cherry-lover"). Following recently molecular phylogenetic studies, it is now placed in the genus Hypsipetes. Alternate names for the white-headed bulbul include Bingham's bulbul and brown-vented bulbul.

== Description ==
A uniquely-plumaged, average-sized bulbul, the white-headed bulbul grows to an average length of 20 cm (7.9 in) and an average weight of 42 g (1.5 oz). It has a largely smoky-grey body and snow-white head, alongside its coral-red legs and bill. The eyes are surrounded by a narrow black eyering. The wings are darker grey than the rest of the body, while the vent is reddish-chestnut. The species may be confused with some white-headed morphs of the black bulbul, but differs from that species in its lighter colouration, vivid rufous-chestnut vent, smaller size, and smoother head plumage.
