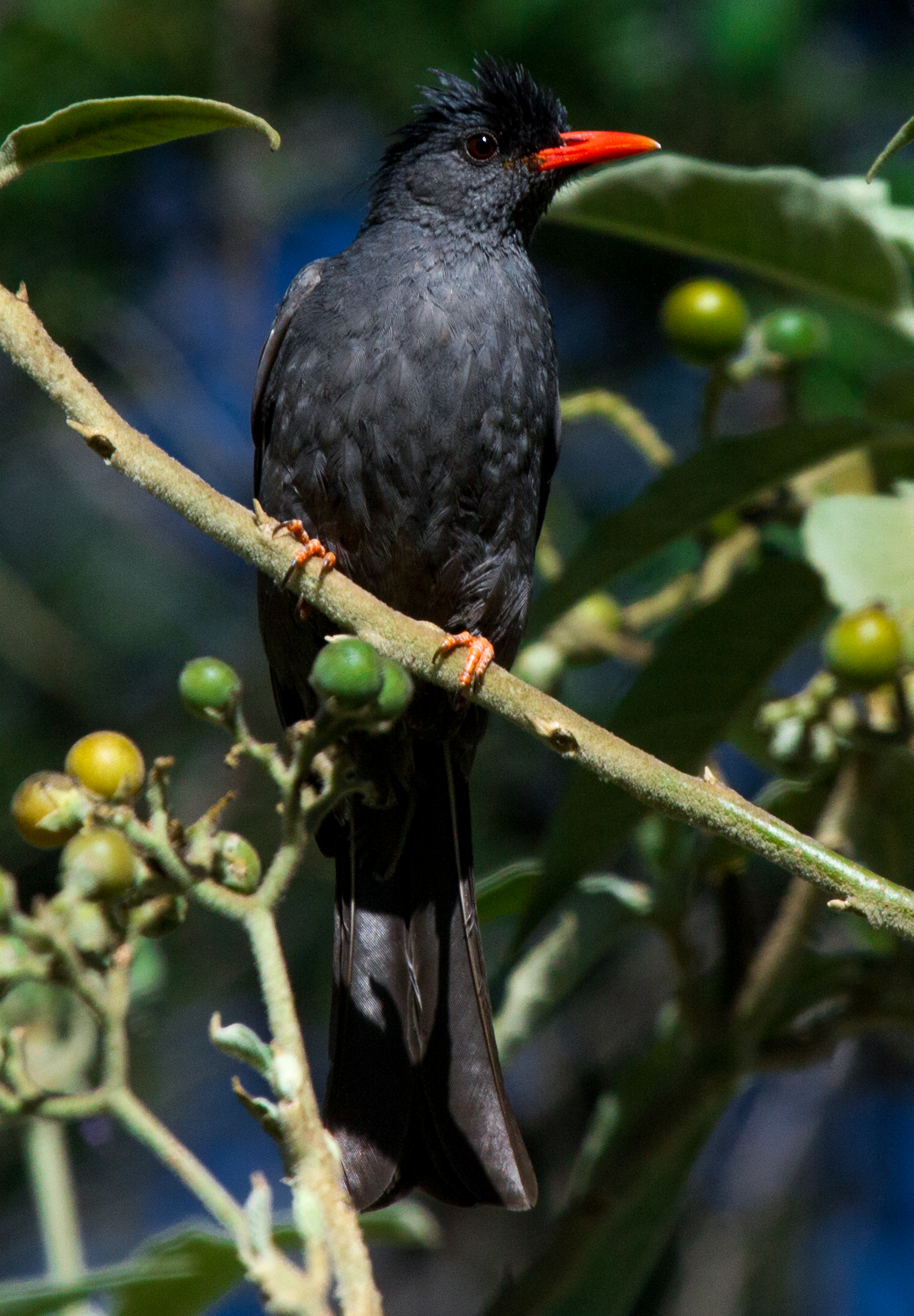

Conservation status
- Least Concern (IUCN 3.1)

Scientific classification
- Kingdom: Animalia
- Phylum: Chordata
- Class: Aves
- Order: Passeriformes
- Family: Pycnonotidae
- Genus: Hypsipetes
- Species: H. ganeesa

Binomial name
- Hypsipetes ganeesa Sykes, 1832

= Square-tailed bulbul =

Species of bird

The square-tailed bulbul (Hypsipetes ganeesa) is a species of songbird in the bulbul family, Pycnonotidae. It is found in south-western India and Sri Lanka. Its natural habitat is subtropical or tropical moist montane forests. It was previously classified as a subspecies of the black bulbul.

== Taxonomy and systematics ==
Alternative names for the square-tailed bulbul include the south Indian black bulbul and the square-tailed black bulbul.

=== Subspecies ===
Two subspecies are currently recognized:

- Sri Lanka bulbul (H. g. humii) - (Whistler & Kinnear, 1932): The Sri Lankan race has a heavier bill than the Indian bulbul. Found in Sri Lanka
- Indian bulbul (H. g. ganeesa) - Sykes, 1832: Found in south-western India

== Description ==
Calls of H. ganeesa (Kotagiri, Nilgiris)

The square-tailed bulbul lacks the black streak behind the eye and on the ear-coverts that is present in the black bulbul.

== Behaviour and ecology ==
In southern India, nesting activity begins in February and rises to a peak in May. The eggs hatch after an incubation period of 12 to 13 days and the chicks fledge after about 11 or 12 days. Populations make movements in response to the monsoon. Nest predators include birds of prey and snakes such as the black-winged kite and oriental ratsnake. Adult square-tailed bulbuls have been known to be preyed upon by the crested goshawk.
