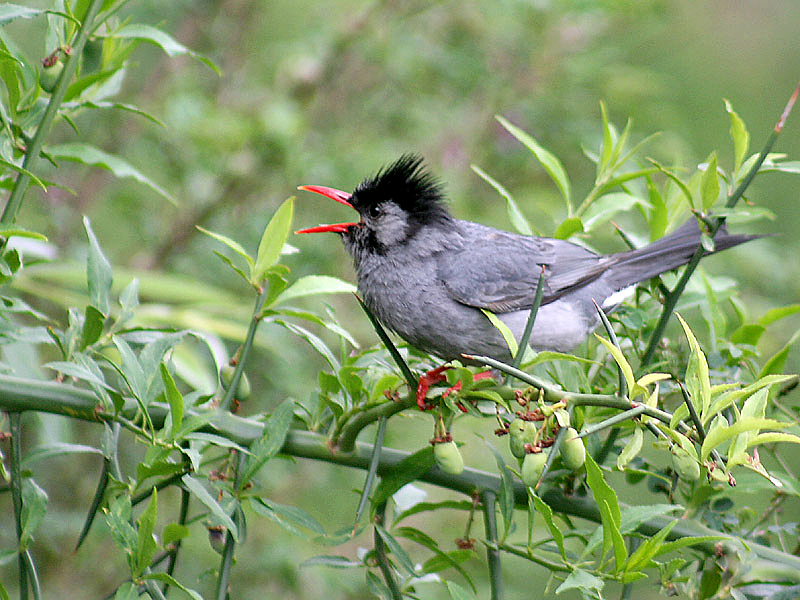
- Black bulbul (Hypsipetes leucocephalus psaroides); Kullu district, Himachal Pradesh (India)

Scientific classification
- Kingdom: Animalia
- Phylum: Chordata
- Class: Aves
- Order: Passeriformes
- Family: Pycnonotidae
- Genus: Hypsipetes; Vigors, 1831

Type species
- Hypsipetes psaroides (black bulbul) Vigors, 1831

Species
- see text

Synonyms
- Ixocincla Blyth, 1845; Anepsia Reichenbach, 1850 (non Gistel, 1848: preoccupied); Haringtonia Mathews & Iredale, 1917

= Hypsipetes =

Genus of birds

Hypsipetes is a genus of bulbuls, songbirds in the family Pycnonotidae. Most of its species occur in tropical forests around the Indian Ocean. But while the genus is quite diverse in the Madagascar region at the western end of its range it does not reach the African mainland.

Most Hypsipetes bulbuls are dark greyish birds with orange or red bills and feet. The feathers on top of the head are slightly elongated and usually black, and can be erected to form a short and wispy crest.

== Taxonomy and systematics ==
The genus Hypsipetes was introduced in 1831 by the Irish zoologist Nicholas Aylward Vigors with Hypsipetes psaroides as the type species. This taxon is now a subspecies of the black bulbul Hypsipetes leucocephalus psaroides. The genus name combines the Ancient Greek hupsi meaning "high" with petēs meaning "-flyer".

=== Species ===
The genus contains the following 27 extant species, as well as 1 extinct species:

Image	Common name	Scientific name
	Nicobar bulbul	Hypsipetes nicobariensis (formerly placed in Ixos)
	Philippine bulbul	Hypsipetes philippinus
	Mindoro bulbul	Hypsipetes mindorensis
	Streak-breasted bulbul	Hypsipetes siquijorensis
	Seram golden bulbul	Hypsipetes affinis (Note: Three species formerly assigned to Thapsinillas were moved to Hypsipetes after molecular phylogenetic analysis found Hypsipetes affinis embedded in the Hypsipetes clade.)
	Ambon golden bulbul	Hypsipetes flavicaudus
	Sangihe golden bulbul	Hypsipetes platenae (split from H. longirostris)
	Togian golden bulbul	Hypsipetes aureus (split from H. longirostris)
	Banggai golden bulbul	Hypsipetes harterti (split from H. longirostris)
	Sula golden bulbul	Hypsipetes longirostris (formerly northern golden bulbul before splits)
	Halmahera golden bulbul	Hypsipetes chloris (split from H. longirostris)
	Obi golden bulbul	Hypsipetes lucasi (split from H. longirostris)
	Buru golden bulbul	Hypsipetes mysticalis
	Visayan bulbul	Hypsipetes guimarasensis
	Yellowish bulbul	Hypsipetes everetti
	Camiguin bulbul	Hypsipetes catarmanensis
	Zamboanga bulbul	Hypsipetes rufigularis
	Brown-eared bulbul	Hypsipetes amaurotis
	Reunion bulbul	Hypsipetes borbonicus
	Malagasy bulbul	Hypsipetes madagascariensis
	Mauritius bulbul	Hypsipetes olivaceus
	White-headed bulbul	Hypsipetes thompsoni (Note: A species formerly placed in the monotypoc genus Cerasophila was moved to Hypsipetes after molecular phylogenetic analysis found embedded in the Hypsipetes clade.)
	Black bulbul	Hypsipetes leucocephalus
	Square-tailed bulbul	Hypsipetes ganeesa
	Grande Comore bulbul	Hypsipetes parvirostris
	Moheli bulbul	Hypsipetes moheliensis
	Seychelles bulbul	Hypsipetes crassirostris
	†Rodrigues bulbul	Hypsipetes cowlesi (extinct, known only from subfossil remains collected in 1974)

=== Former species ===
Some authorities, either presently or formerly, recognize several additional species as belonging to the genus Hypsipetes including:

- Eastern bearded greenbul (as Hypsipetes malaccensis)
- Yellow-browed bulbul (as Hypsipetes indica or Hypsipetes indicus)
- Hairy-backed bulbul (as Hypsipetes criniger)
- Olive bulbul (as Hypsipetes virescens or Hypsipetes viridescens)
- Grey-eyed bulbul (as Hypsipetes propinquus)
- Buff-vented bulbul (as Hypsipetes olivacea)
- Sulphur-bellied bulbul (as Hypsipetes palawanensis)
- Nicobar bulbul (as Hypsipetes nicobariensis, Hypsipetes virescens, or Ixocincla virescens)
- Mountain bulbul (as Hypsipetes mcclellandi or Hypsipetes mcclellandii) was often included in Hypsipetes due to an error that was promoted in modern times by the Sibley taxonomy
- Mountain bulbul (tickelli) (as Hypsipetes tickelli) was often included in Hypsipetes due to an error that was promoted in modern times by the Sibley taxonomy
- Mountain bulbul (holtii) (as Hypsipetes holtii) was often included in Hypsipetes due to an error that was promoted in modern times by the Sibley taxonomy
- Streaked bulbul (as Hypsipetes malaccensis)
- Sunda bulbul (as Hypsipetes virescens) was often included in Hypsipetes due to an error that was promoted in modern times by the Sibley taxonomy
- Seram golden bulbul (as Hypsipetes affinis)
- Ashy bulbul (as Hypsipetes flavalus)
- Chestnut bulbul (as Hypsipetes castanonotus)
- White-headed bulbul (as Hypsipetes thompsoni)

== Sources ==
Media related to Hypsipetes at Wikimedia Commons

- Gregory, Steven M. (2000): Nomenclature of the Hypsipetes Bulbuls (Pycnonotidae). Forktail 16: 164–166. PDF fulltext
- Moyle, Robert G. & Marks, Ben D. (2006): Phylogenetic relationships of the bulbuls (Aves: Pycnonotidae) based on mitochondrial and nuclear DNA sequence data. Mol. Phylogenet. Evol. 40(3): 687–695. doi:10.1016/j.ympev.2006.04.015 (HTML abstract)
- Pasquet, Éric; Han, Lian-Xian; Khobkhet, Obhas & Cibois, Alice (2001): Towards a molecular systematics of the genus Criniger, and a preliminary phylogeny of the bulbuls (Aves, Passeriformes, Pycnonotidae). Zoosystema 23(4): 857–863. PDF fulltext
