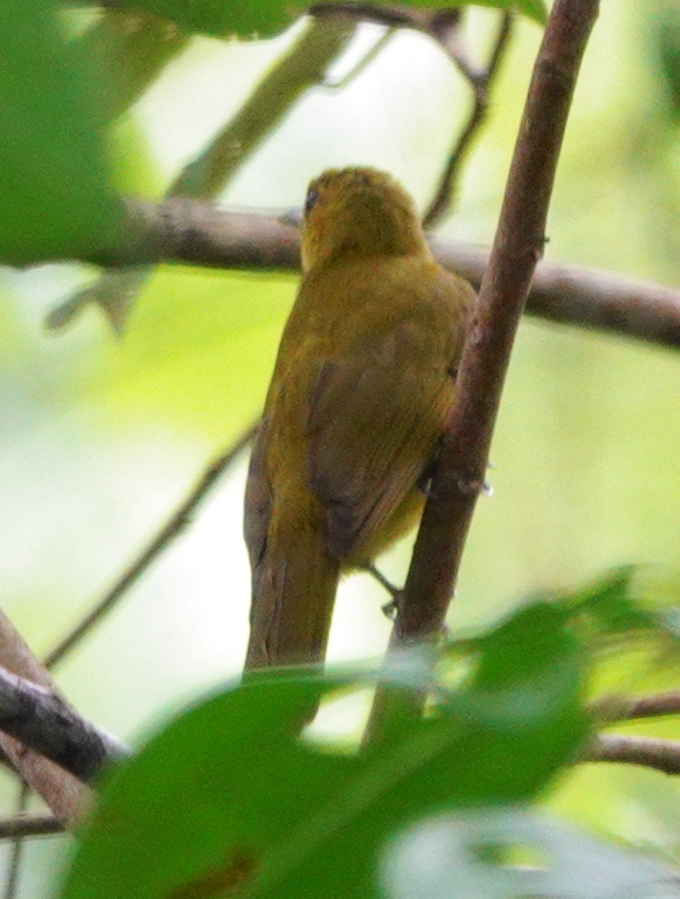

Conservation status
- Least Concern (IUCN 3.1)

Scientific classification
- Kingdom: Animalia
- Phylum: Chordata
- Class: Aves
- Order: Passeriformes
- Family: Pycnonotidae
- Genus: Hypsipetes
- Species: H. lucasi

Binomial name
- Hypsipetes lucasi (Hartert, 1903)

= Obi golden bulbul =

Species of songbird

The Obi golden bulbul (Hypsipetes lucasi) is a species of passerine bird in the bulbul family Pycnonotidae. It is found in Obi in Indonesia. Its natural habitat is subtropical or tropical moist lowland forests.

== Taxonomy ==
The Obi golden bulbul was originally classified in the genus Criniger, and has also been previously been placed in the genera Thapsinillas and Alophoixus. It is one of nine species in the golden bulbul complex, a group of closely-related bulbuls found in Indonesia that were all formerly considered to be subspecies of a single, wide-ranging Hypsipetes affinis (now restricted to the Seram golden bulbul). Beginning in the 2000s, these species were gradually split on the basis of genetic, morphological, and vocal evidence supporting their placement as distinct species. The Obi golden bulbul was separated as a distinct species in 2013 on the basis of morphological and vocal differences with other species. It is especially similar to the Halmahera golden bulbul, but differs slightly from that species in its appearance. The two species also have distinct vocalizations.

== Description ==
A large, long-billed species of bulbul, the Obi golden bulbul grows to an average length of 21 cm (8.3 in). It is largely light olive-yellow in colour, with the exception of its contrasting, paler yellow face and underparts.

== Distribution and habitat ==
The Obi golden bulbul is endemic to the northern Maluku Islands in eastern Indonesia, where it is known only from the island of Obi. A common forest bird, it is known to inhabit both pristine and disturbed forests at elevations of up to 1,210 m (3,970 ft).
