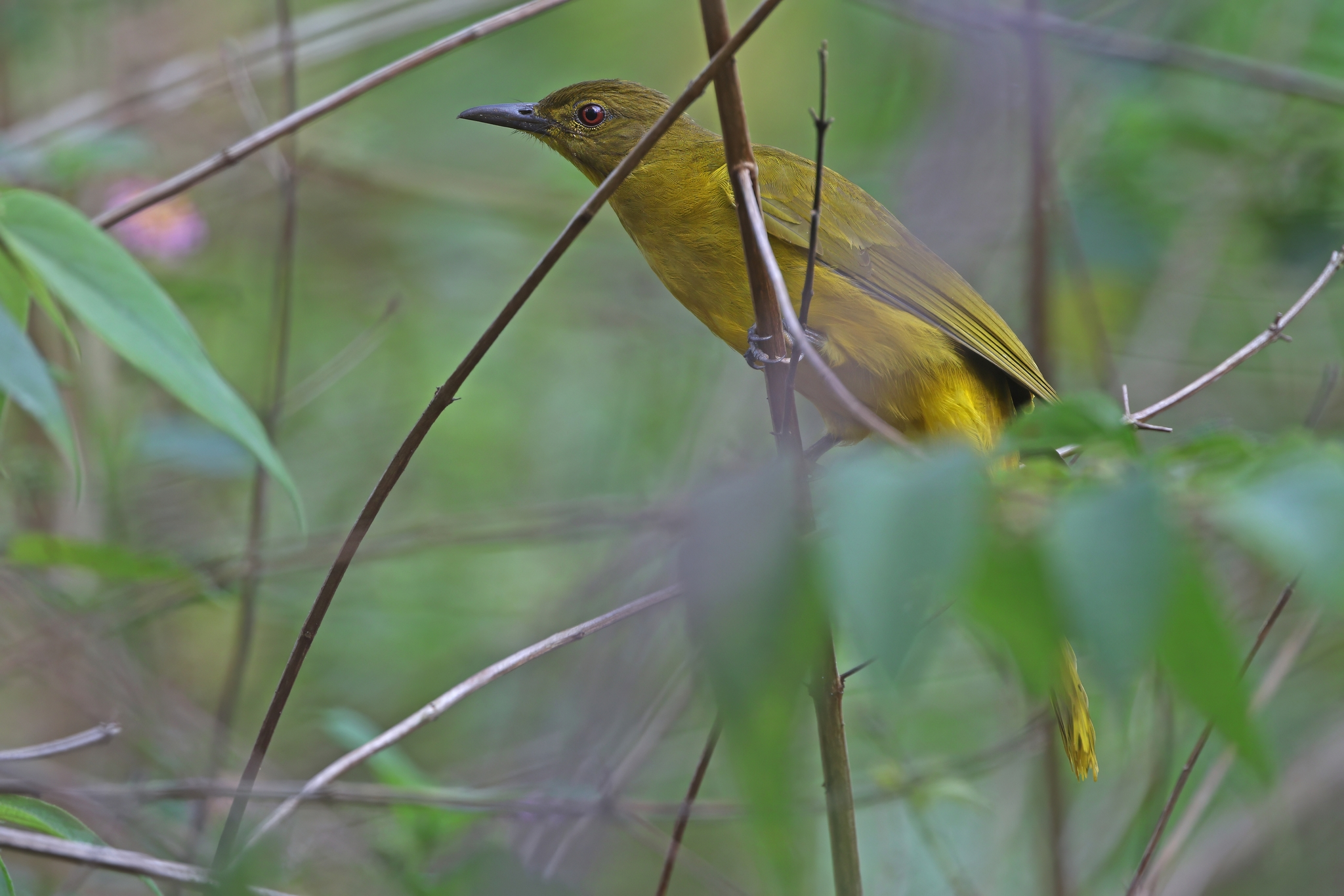

Conservation status
- Least Concern (IUCN 3.1)

Scientific classification
- Kingdom: Animalia
- Phylum: Chordata
- Class: Aves
- Order: Passeriformes
- Family: Pycnonotidae
- Genus: Hypsipetes
- Species: H. aureus

Binomial name
- Hypsipetes aureus (Walden, 1872)

= Togian golden bulbul =

Species of songbird

The Togian golden bulbul (Hypsipetes aureus) is a species of passerine bird in the bulbul family Pycnonotidae. It is endemic to the Togian Islands in Indonesia. Its natural habitat is subtropical or tropical moist lowland forests.

The Togian golden bulbul was formerly considered as conspecific with five other bulbuls, all called the northern golden bulbul before they were all split. This bulbul is now both placed with 24 other species in the genus Hypsipetes that was introduced in 1831 by Nicholas Vigors.
