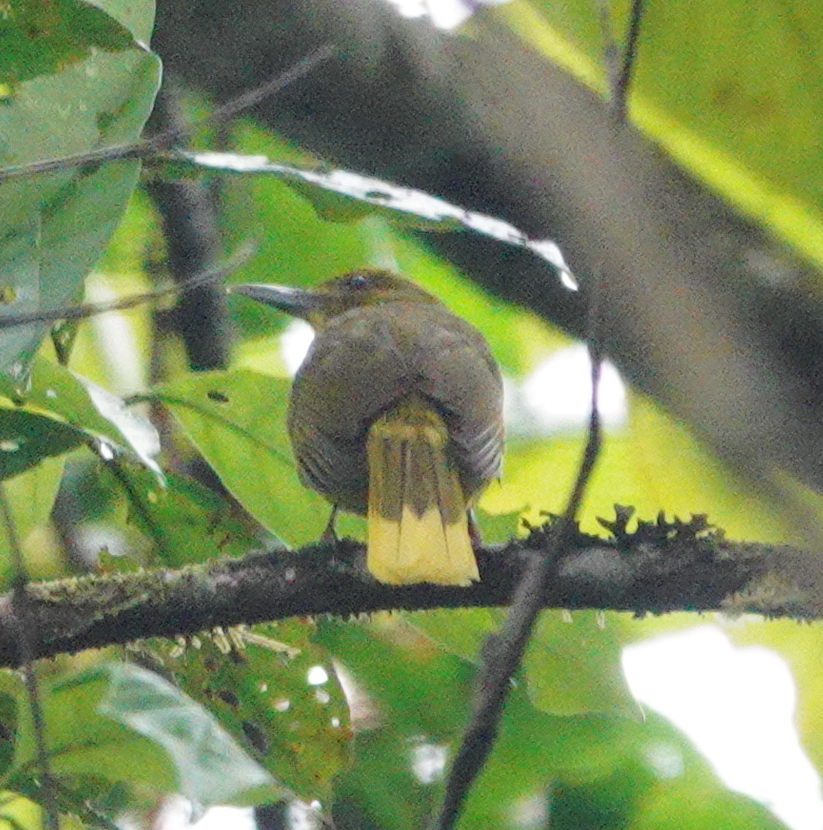

Conservation status
- Least Concern (IUCN 3.1)

Scientific classification
- Kingdom: Animalia
- Phylum: Chordata
- Class: Aves
- Order: Passeriformes
- Family: Pycnonotidae
- Genus: Hypsipetes
- Species: H. affinis

Binomial name
- Hypsipetes affinis (Hombron & Jacquinot, 1841)

Synonyms
- Alophoixus affinis; Criniger affinis; Hypsipetes affinis; Ixos affinis

= Seram golden bulbul =

Species of songbird

The Seram golden bulbul (Hypsipetes affinis) is a species of songbird in the family Pycnonotidae. It is endemic to the Moluccas. Until recently, it was considered conspecific with the other eight species in the golden bulbul species complex. Its natural habitat is subtropical or tropical moist lowland forests.

== Taxonomy and systematics ==
The Seram golden bulbul was originally classified in the genus Criniger, and has also been classified in the genera Hypsipetes, Ixos, and Alophoixus. It is one of nine species in the golden bulbul complex, a group of closely-related bulbuls found in Indonesia that were all formerly considered to be subspecies of a single, wide-ranging Hypsipetes affinis. Beginning in the 2000s, these species were gradually split on the basis of genetic, morphological, and vocal evidence supporting their placement as distinct species. The Seram and Ambon golden bulbuls were the last two species in this complex to be split, with the latter being considered a subspecies of the former as late as 2025.

== Description ==
The Seram golden bulbul is a quite large bulbul, growing to an average length of 22–24 cm (8.7–9.4 in) and an average weight of 46 g (1.6 oz). It has mostly olive-yellow upperparts, with yellow lores and spiky plumes on the back of the neck. The underparts are lighter and yellower than the upperparts. The end of the tail is bright yellow. These bulbuls have blackish bills and brownish-red eyes.

== Distribution and habitat ==
The Seram golden bulbul is endemic to Seram, the largest island in the Maluku Islands, an archipelago in eastern Indonesia. It is an inhabitant of broadleaf rainforests and woodlands, including secondary forest, and is also known to frequent logged areas such as gardens. One of the most common birds on Seram, it is widespread on the island and can be seen up to 1,045 m (3,400 ft), although it does seem to prefer lower altitudes.
