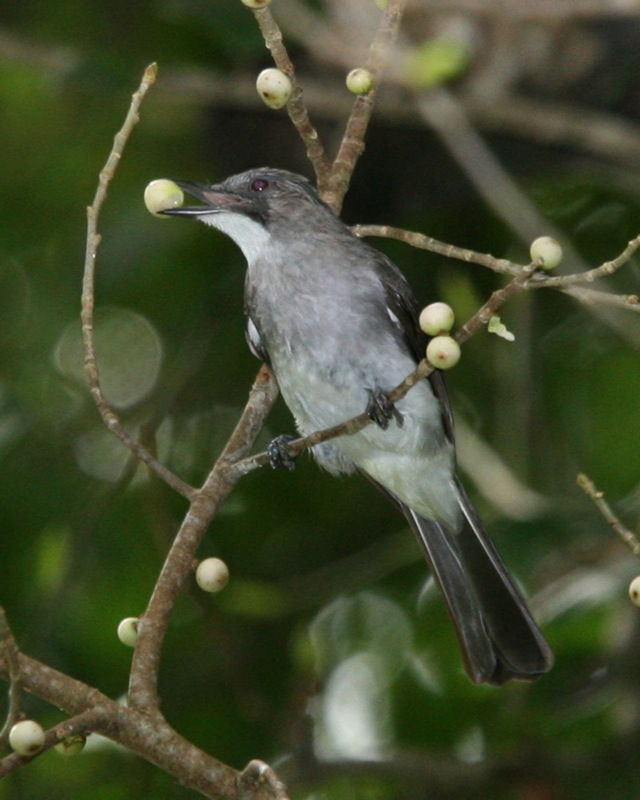

Conservation status
- Least Concern (IUCN 3.1)

Scientific classification
- Domain: Eukaryota
- Kingdom: Animalia
- Phylum: Chordata
- Class: Aves
- Order: Passeriformes
- Family: Pycnonotidae
- Genus: Hemixos
- Species: H. cinereus

Binomial name
- Hemixos cinereus (Blyth, 1845)

Synonyms
- Hemixos flavala cinereus; Iole cinerea

= Cinereous bulbul =

Species of songbird

The cinereous bulbul (Hemixos cinereus) is a species of songbird in the bulbul family, Pycnonotidae. It is found in Southeast Asia and Indonesia.

== Taxonomy and systematics ==
The cinereous bulbul was originally classified in the genus Iole. It was formerly considered as conspecific with the ashy bulbul.

=== Subspecies ===
Two subspecies are currently recognized:

- H. c. cinereus - (Blyth, 1845): Found on the Malay Peninsula and Sumatra
- Green-winged bulbul (H. c. connectens) - Sharpe, 1887: Formerly described as a separate species by some authorities. Found in northern Borneo
