= Microscelis =

Genus of birds

Microscelis is a former genus of bulbuls described by George Robert Gray in 1840.

The following species were classified within the genus Microscelis but are now assigned to Iole, Hemixos or Hypsipetes:

- Olive bulbul (as Microscelis viridescens)
- Buff-vented bulbul (as Microscelis charlottae)
- Ashy bulbul (as Microscelis flavala)
- Brown-eared bulbul (as Microscelis amaurotis)
- Black bulbul (as Microscelis leucocephalus)
- Black bulbul (psaroides) (as Microscelis psaroides)
