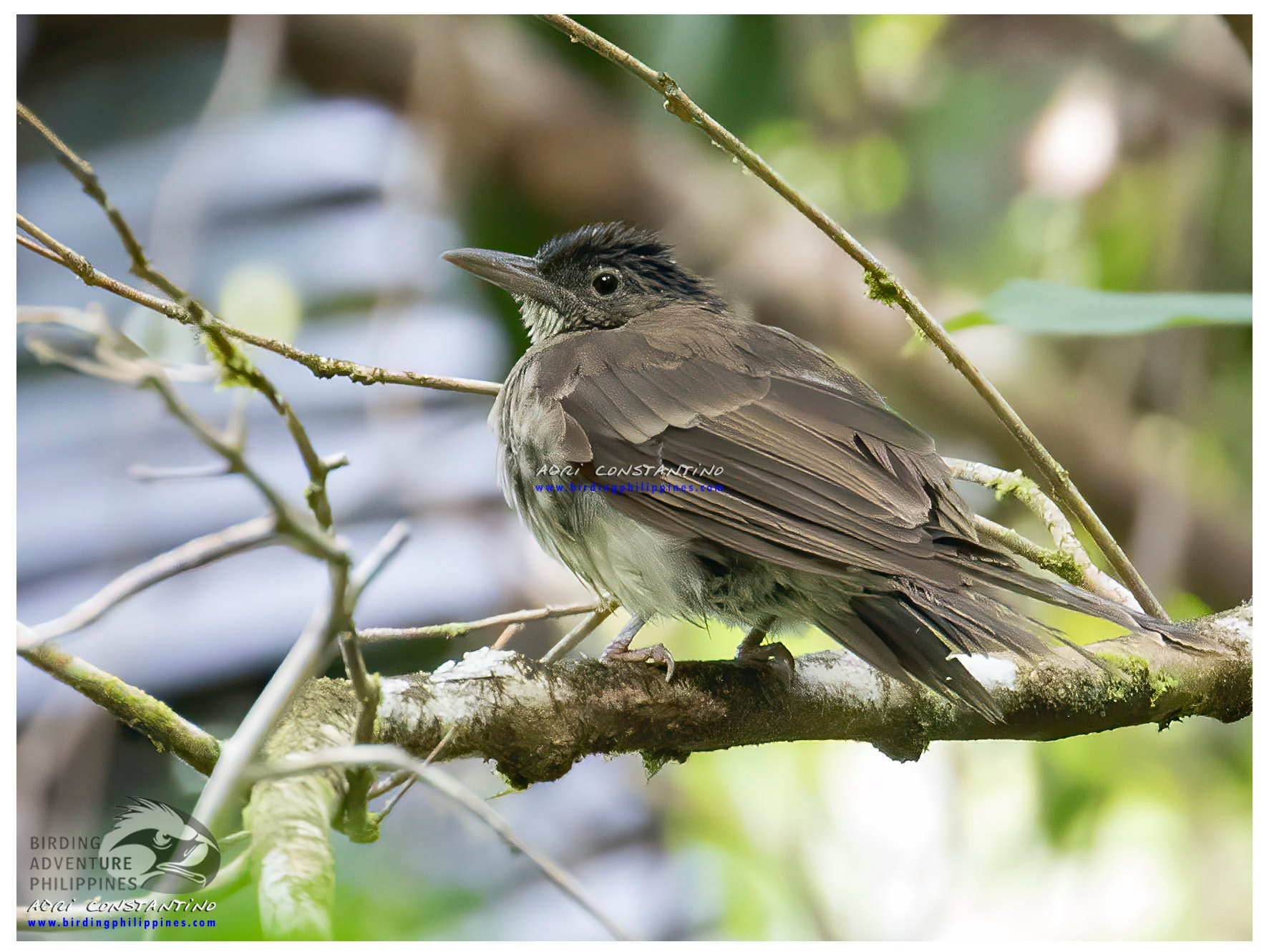
- Siquijor bulbul
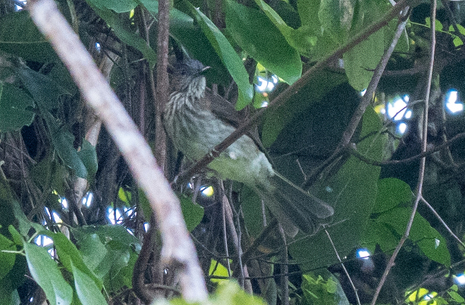
- Cebu bulbul

Conservation status
- Endangered (IUCN 3.1)

Scientific classification
- Kingdom: Animalia
- Phylum: Chordata
- Class: Aves
- Order: Passeriformes
- Family: Pycnonotidae
- Genus: Hypsipetes
- Species: H. siquijorensis

Binomial name
- Hypsipetes siquijorensis (Steere, 1890)

Synonyms
- Iole siquijorensis; Ixos siquijorensis (Steere, 1890)

= Streak-breasted bulbul =

Species of bird

The streak-breasted bulbul (Hypsipetes siquijorensis) is a songbird species in the bulbul family, Pycnonotidae.

It is endemic to the Philippines found in the Visayas on the islands of Tablas Island, Siquijor, Cebu and Romblon. This species is believed to be a species complex and its three subspecies are all distinct species namely the Cebu bulbul, Tablas bulbul and the Siquijor bulbul. Its natural habitat is tropical moist lowland forest and tropical moist shrubland.

It is currently an endangered species. If split into three species, the Cebu bulbul and Romblon bulbul are likely critically endangered. Thought extinct until its rediscovery on 1996, the Cebu bulbul in particular is especially at risk of extinction as unlike the other subspecies, is a forest specialist and cannot survive in scrubland. It is threatened by habitat loss and hunting.

== Description and taxonomy ==
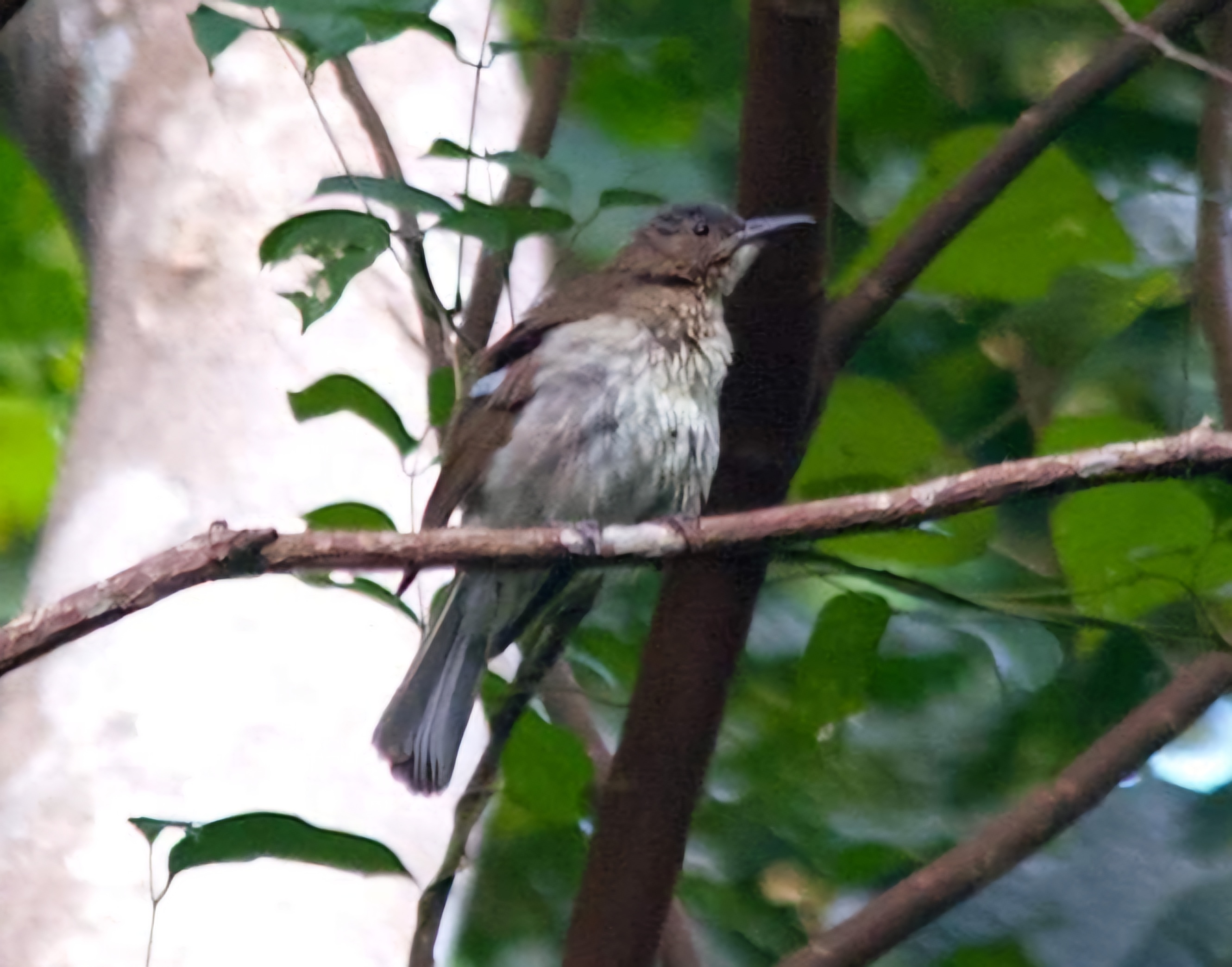
Romblon bulbul

However, this description mostly refers to the subspecies siquijorensis (potentially a split). The other two subspecies have much lighter colored appearances and no spiky crown.

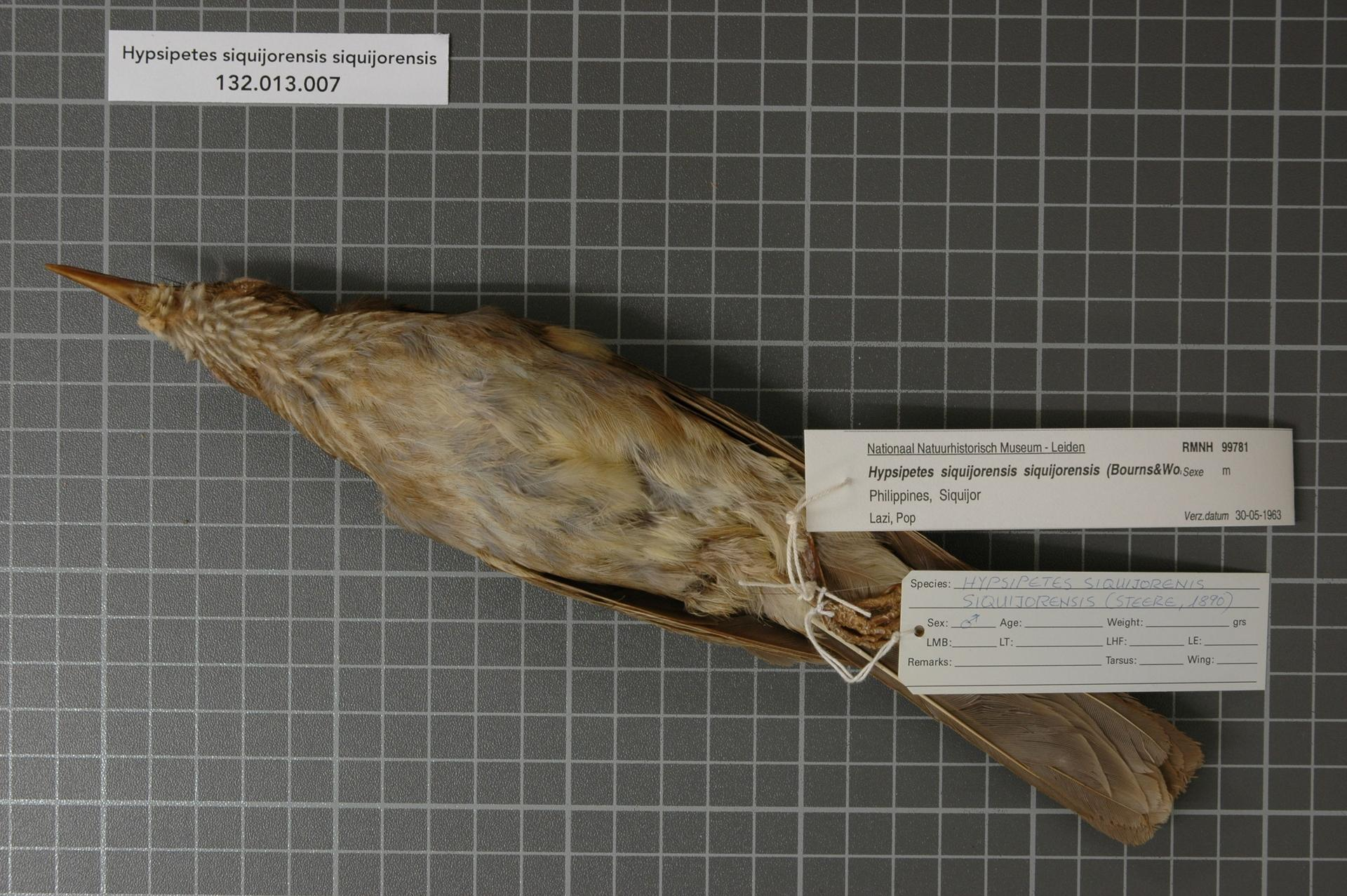
A stuffed specimen of the nominate subspecies from the Naturalis Biodiversity Center

The streak-breasted bulbul was originally described in the genus Iole and later placed in the genus Ixos before being re-classified to the genus Hypsipetes in 2010. Alternate names for the streak-breasted bulbul include the mottle-breasted bulbul and slaty-crowned bulbul.

=== Subspecies ===
Three subspecies are currently recognized: It has been proposed that each should be elevated to the full species level with each having different calls and considerable differences in appearances.

- Tablas bulbul (H. s. cinereiceps) - (Bourns & Worcester, 1894): Originally described as a separate species in the genus Iole. Found on Tablas and Romblon. Gray spiky crown and overall appearance with a large bill.
- Cebu bulbul (H. s. monticola) - (Bourns & Worcester, 1894): Originally described as a separate species in the genus Iole. Alternatively named the Cebu slaty-crowned bulbul. Found on Cebu. White throat and overall paler appearance. Thought extinct until its rediscovery in 1996.
- Siquijor bulbul (H. s. siquijorensis) - (Steere, 1890): Found on Siquijor. Slightly larger with a spiky black crest.

== Ecology and behavior ==
Not much information of its diet in the wild. The Siquijor subspecies has been observed feeding on bananas in a kitchen. The Siquijor sub-species survives in scrub and close to human settlements and is believed to be much more of a generalist compared to the Cebu and Romblon subspecies. The other two subspecies are believed to feed on fruits and berries but diet has yet to be studied.

The Siqujor subspecies has been recorded nesting in June. The Cebu subspecies has been recorded nesting in February.

== Habitat and conservation status ==
It is found in tropical lowland moist primary and secondary forest. It is able to tolerate degraded habitat provided there is nearby forest but occurs in lower densities in these areas.

IUCN has assessed this bird as endangered with population estimates being 2,500 to 9,999 mature individuals and continuing to decrease. Although it can tolerate less than ideal forest, this species' main threat is habitat loss with wholesale clearance of forest habitats as a result of logging, agricultural conversion and mining activities occurring within the range. Siquijor, Cebu and Tablas Island are some of the most deforested islands with just 8 km^{2} of forest remaining on Siquijor and 15km^{2} on Cebu. It appears to face interspecies competition from the Yellow-vented bulbul and the Philippine bulbul.

Conservation actions proposed include: the promotion of improved management of the existing reserves to prevent further habitat deterioration on Siquijor, Cebu and Romblon; the designation of further protected areas as appropriate, particularly on Tablas Island; the promotion of forest restoration and regeneration on Tablas Island; and on Cebu, investigation into the potential for targeted conservation, including captive breeding, of the subspecies monticola.
