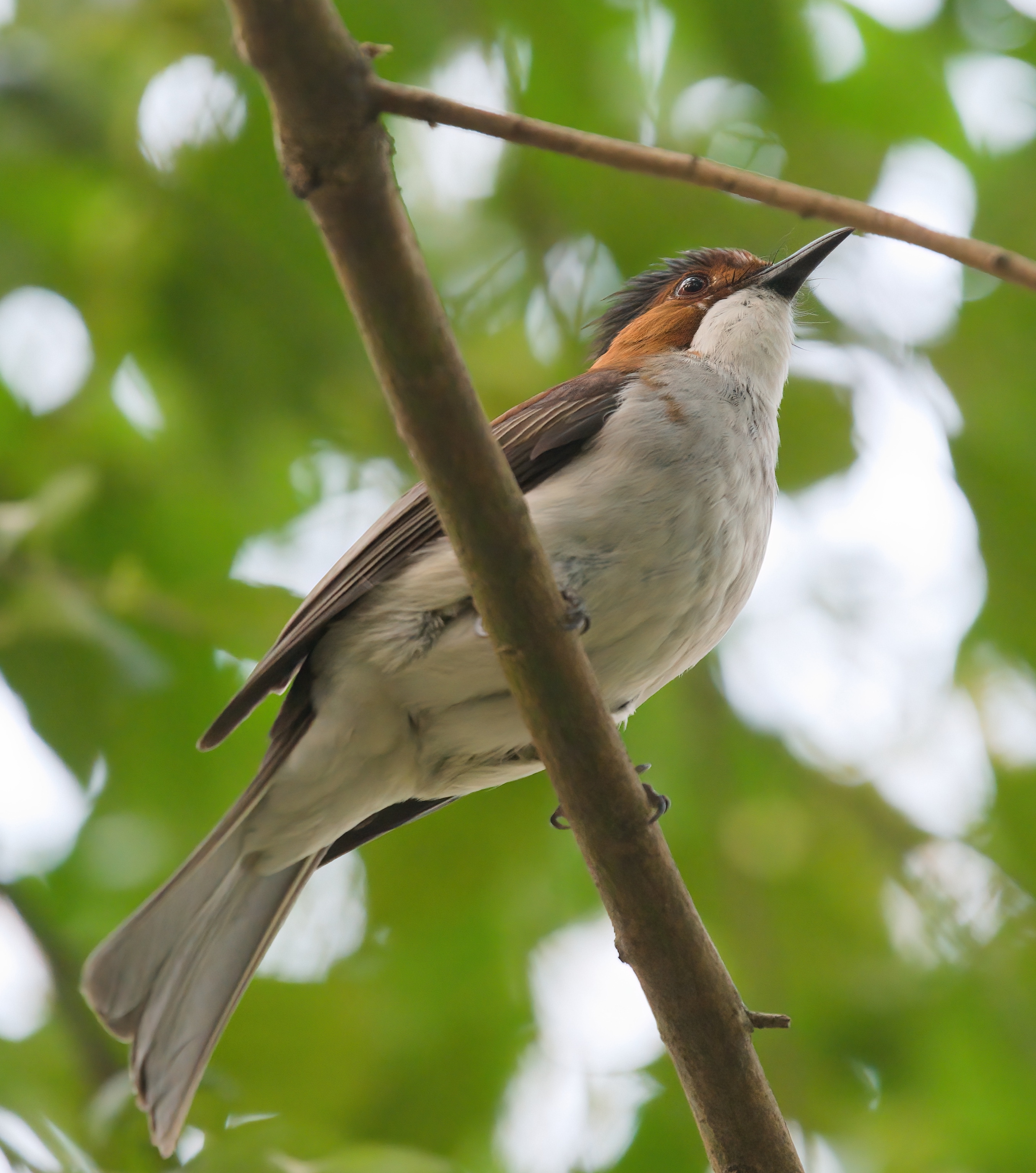

Conservation status
- Least Concern (IUCN 3.1)

Scientific classification
- Kingdom: Animalia
- Phylum: Chordata
- Class: Aves
- Order: Passeriformes
- Family: Pycnonotidae
- Genus: Hemixos
- Species: H. castanonotus

Binomial name
- Hemixos castanonotus R. Swinhoe, 1870
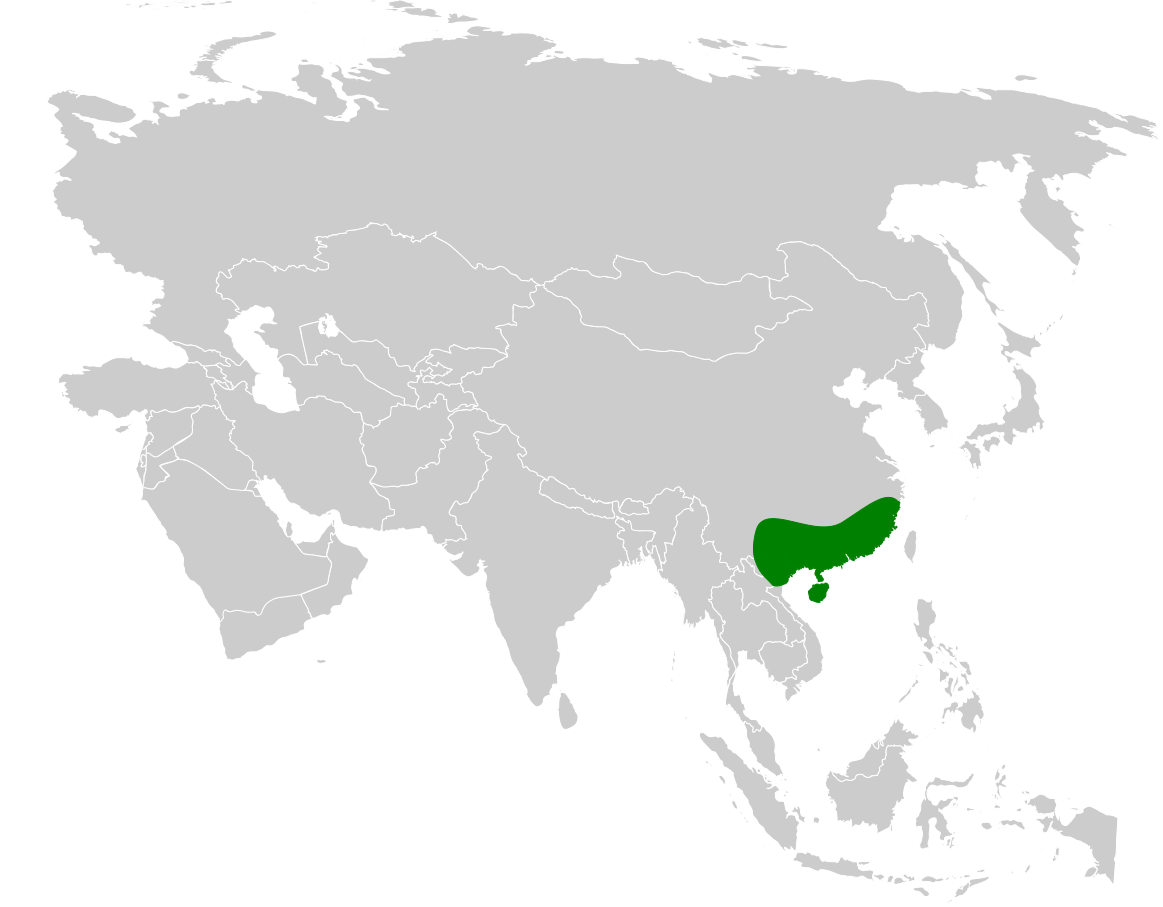

Synonyms
- Hemixos castanotus; Hemixos casteonotus; Hemixus castanonotus; Hypsipetes castanonotus; Hypsipetes flavalus castanonotus

= Chestnut bulbul =

Species of bird

The chestnut bulbul or chestnut-backed bulbul (Hemixos castanonotus) is a songbird in the bulbul family, Pycnonotidae. The species was first described by Robert Swinhoe in 1870. It is found in southern China and northern Vietnam. Its natural habitat is subtropical or tropical moist lowland forests; it primarily resides in the canopy.

== Diet ==
It is an omnivore.

== Taxonomy and systematics ==
Formerly, some authorities classified the chestnut bulbul in the genus Hypsipetes and also as a subspecies of the ashy bulbul.

=== Subspecies ===
Two subspecies are currently recognized:

- H. c. canipennis - Seebohm, 1890: Found in southern China and north-eastern Vietnam
- H. c. castanonotus - R. Swinhoe, 1870: Found in northern Vietnam and on Hainan

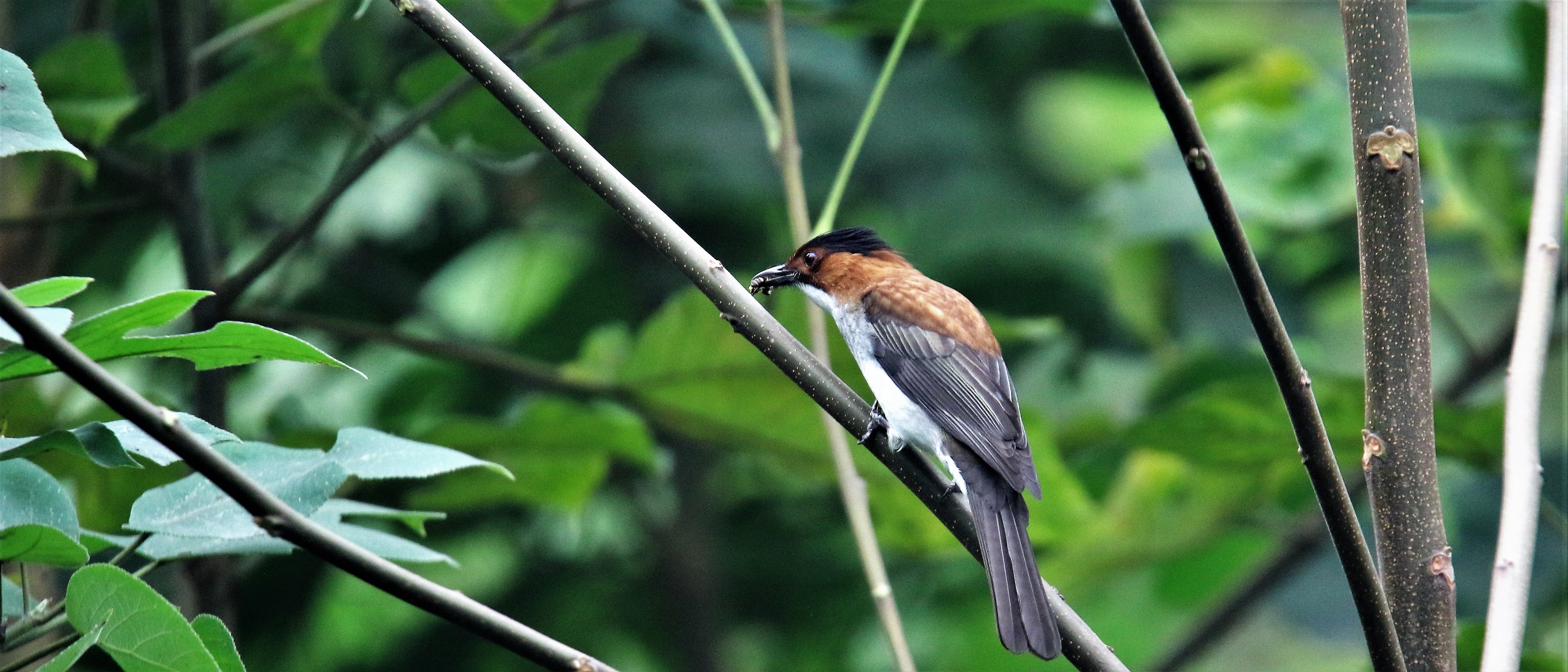
