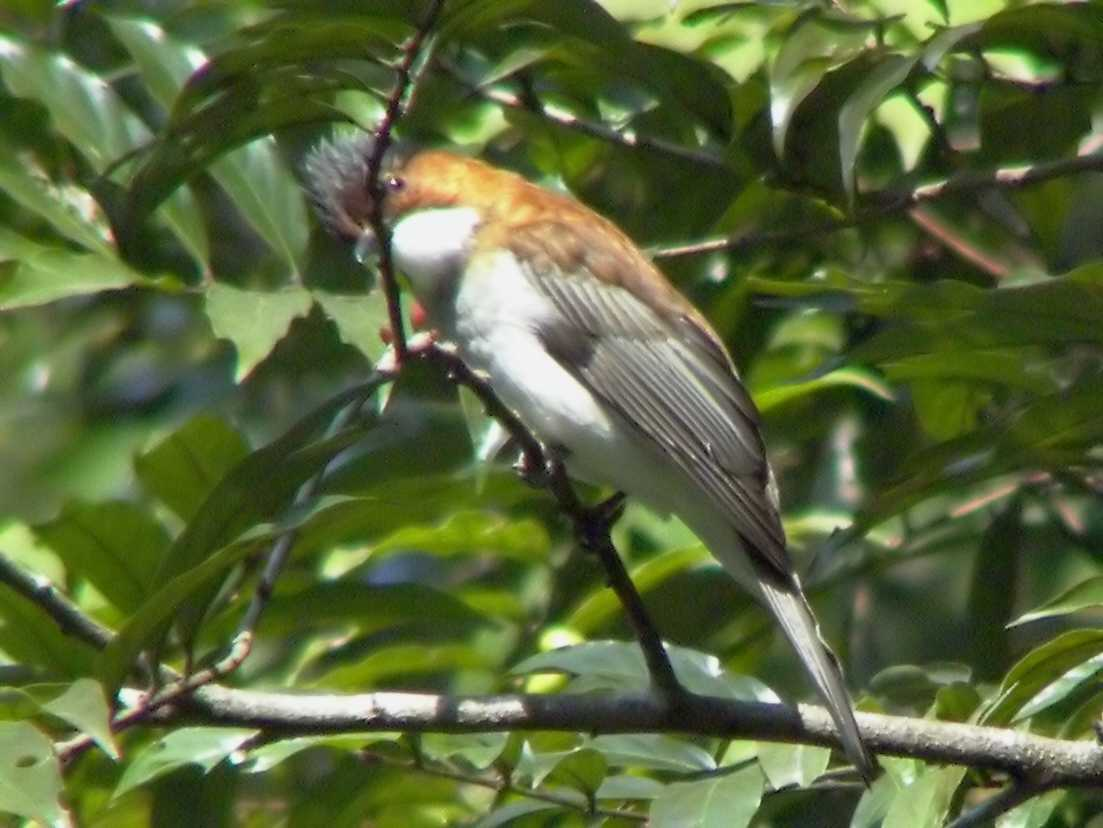
- Chestnut bulbul (H. castanonotus)

Scientific classification
- Kingdom: Animalia
- Phylum: Chordata
- Class: Aves
- Order: Passeriformes
- Family: Pycnonotidae
- Genus: Hemixos; Blyth, 1845

Type species
- Hemixos flavala Blyth, 1845

Species
- see text
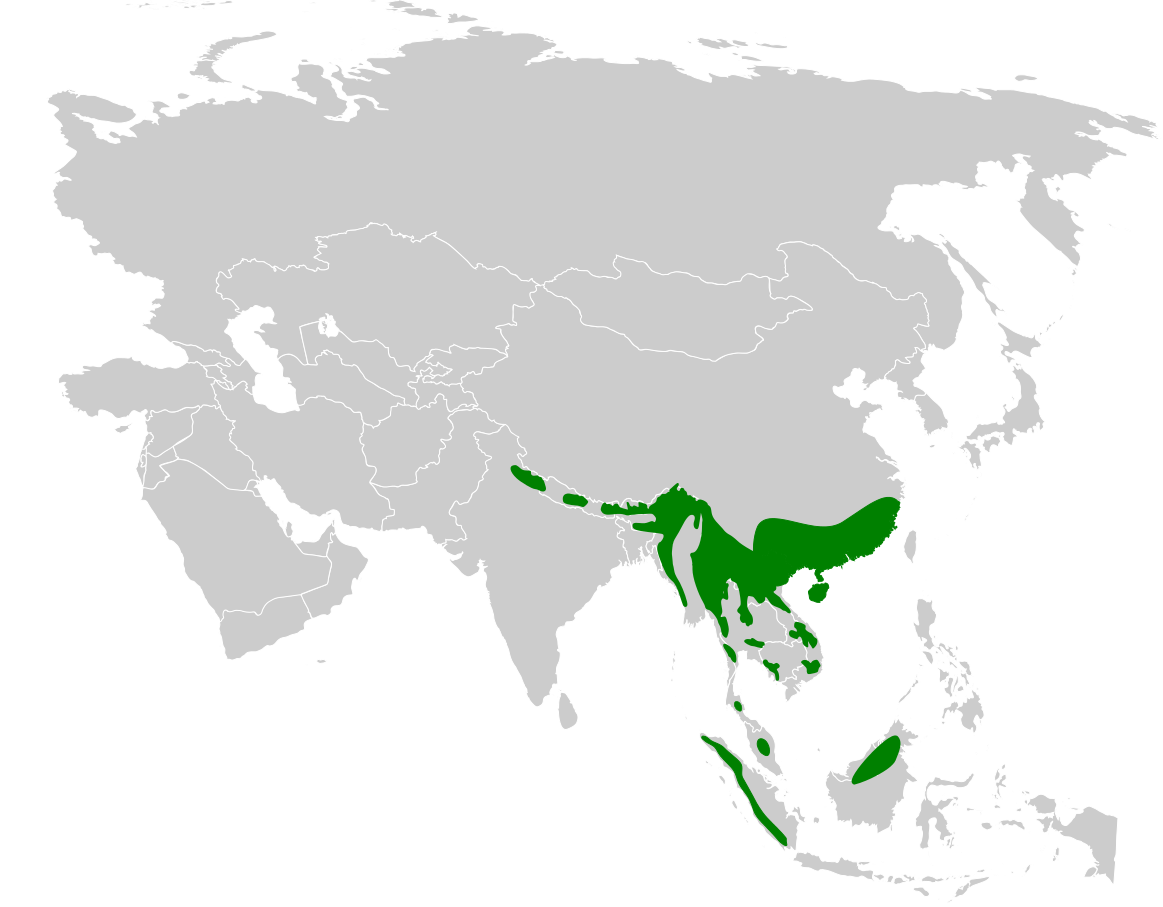

Synonyms
- Hemixus Hodgson

= Hemixos =

Genus of birds

Hemixos is a songbird genus in the bulbul family, Pycnonotidae.

== Taxonomy and systematics ==
Established by Edward Blyth in 1845 for the newly discovered ashy bulbul (H. flavala), this genus contains four extant species.

Some treatments merge the genus into Hypsipetes, often together with the rest of the traditional "Hypsipetes group" of bulbuls: Iole, Ixos, Microscelis and Tricholestes. But in this case, the closely related genera Alophoixus and Setornis would probably also have to be included, and as soon as the earliest described genus, Ixos, is merged with another its name would apply.

In fact, Hemixos is not particularly close to Hypsipetes, and a merger is not well justified. mtDNA NADH dehydrogenase subunits 2 and 3 and nDNA β-fibrinogen intron 7 sequence data puts it closer to (but still well distant from) the streaked bulbul (Ixos malaccensis). But whether that species represents the core group of Ixos – around its type species I. virescens (Sunda bulbul or green-winged bulbul) – or a distinct lineage worthy of separation in a new genus – in which case Hypsipetes might be merged into the core group of Ixos – has not been studied. In any case, though minor, the Hemixos lineage with its stark white throat and light wing patches seems well distinct.

=== Extant species ===
Three species are currently recognised:

Image	Scientific name	Common name	Distribution
	Ashy bulbul	Hemixos flavala	Himalayas, Patkai, Yunnan and Indochina
	Cinereous bulbul	Hemixos cinereus	western Malaysia
	Chestnut bulbul	Hemixos castanonotus	southern China and Hainan

=== Former species ===
Previously, some authorities also classified the following species (or subspecies) as species within the genus Hemixos:

- Cream-striped bulbul (as Hemixos leucogrammicus)
- Sumatran bulbul (as Hemixus sumatranus)
