= Hypsipetes olivacea =

Hypsipetes olivacea may refer to:

- Buff-vented bulbul, a species of bird found in Southeast Asia and Indonesia
- Mauritius bulbul, a species of bird found on Mauritius
