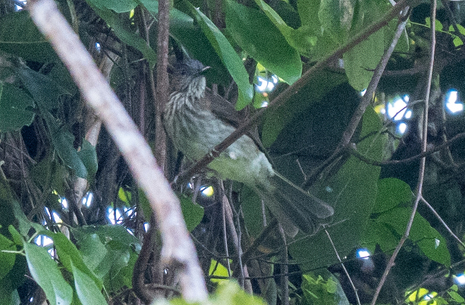

Scientific classification
- Kingdom: Animalia
- Phylum: Chordata
- Class: Aves
- Order: Passeriformes
- Family: Pycnonotidae
- Genus: Hypsipetes
- Species: H. siquijorensis
- Subspecies: H. s. monticola

Trinomial name
- Hypsipetes siquijorensis monticola Bourns & Worcester, 1894

= Cebu bulbul =

Cebu streak-breasted bulbul

Subspecies of bird

The Cebu bulbul (Hypsipetes siquijorensis monticola) also known as the Cebu slaty-crowned bulbul or the Cebu streak-breasted bulbul is a subspecies of the streak-breasted bulbul. It is endemic to the Philippines found only on the island of Cebu where its natural habitat is tropical moist lowland forest. Thought extinct until its rediscovery in 1996, it is threatened by habitat loss and hunting. It is likely that this will eventually be split into a separate species and if so will become one of the most endangered species in the world.

== Description and taxonomy ==
Relative to the Siquijor streak-breasted bulbul, this bird has a paler crown, a more rufous back, a cleaner throat and is slightly smaller. The Cebu bulbul is a forest specialist and does not tolerate scrub and clearings. Its call is described as a loud raucous screech followed by a short melodious whistle.

It is typically encountered in singly or in pairs and is much more shy than the common Philippine bulbul.

== Ecology and behavior ==
Not much information of its diet in the wild. It is believed to feed on fruits and berries but diet has yet to be studied.

The Cebu subspecies has been recorded nesting in February.

== Habitat and conservation status ==
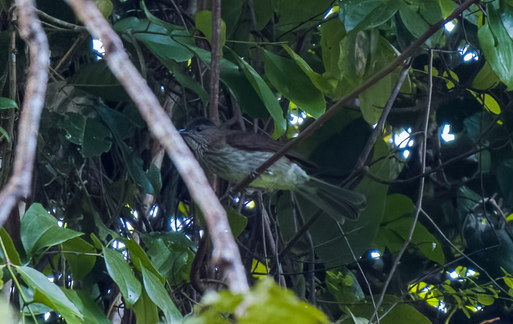
One of the last remaining Cebu bulbul in Tabunan Forest

This species is especially threatened because more reliant on tall forest as this bird is outcompeted in scrub forest by the Philippine bulbul.

IUCN has assessed the streak-breasted bulbul as a whole as endangered with population estimates being 2,500 to 9,999 mature individuals and continuing to decrease. Most of this estimate is of the nominate subspecies. Relative to the other 2 subspecies, this bird is not tolerant to habitat loss and can only survive in the small remaining patches of forest on Cebu. Apart from habitat It is believed to face significant competition from the Philippine bulbul.

Most sight records are in Tabunan which is just 80 hectares, with estimates as low as 10 birds. There is a larger forest patch in Alcoy of more than 500 hectares where it has been reported in surveys but has not been reported on EBird since 2012 despite numerous observers.

There are currently no targeted species conservation programs for this bird. Conservation actions proposed include:the promotion of forest restoration and regeneration on Cebu in Tabunan and the investigation into the potential for targeted conservation, including captive breeding of this subspecies.
