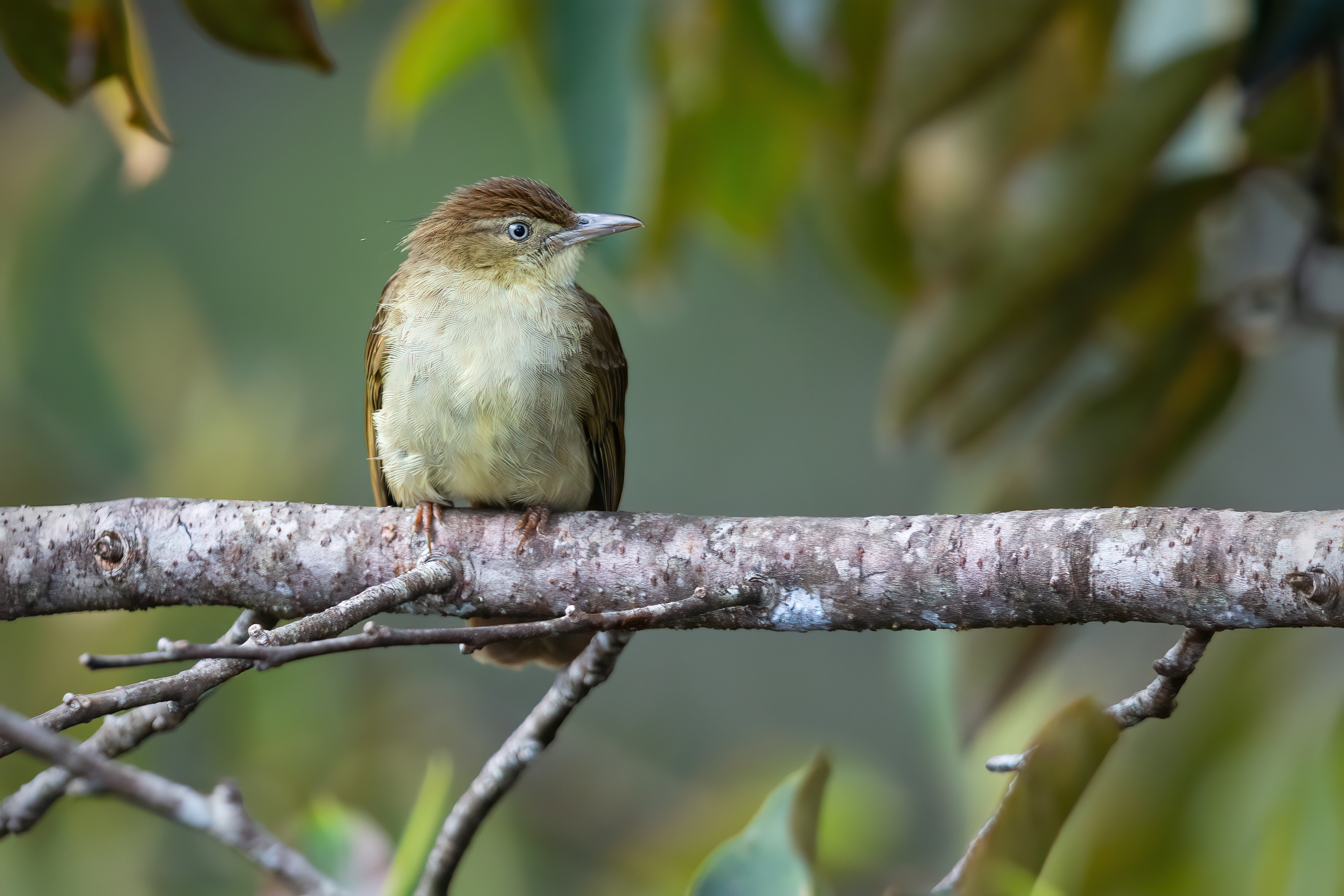

Conservation status
- Near Threatened (IUCN 3.1)

Scientific classification
- Kingdom: Animalia
- Phylum: Chordata
- Class: Aves
- Order: Passeriformes
- Family: Pycnonotidae
- Genus: Iole
- Species: I. charlottae

Binomial name
- Iole charlottae (Finsch, 1867)

Synonyms
- Criniger charlottae; Hypsipetes charlottae perplexa; Hypsipetes charlottae perplexus; Hypsipetes olivacea perplexa; Iole charlottae perplexa; Iole olivacea perplexa; Microscelis charlottae perplexa

= Charlotte's bulbul =

Species of songbird

Charlotte's bulbul (Iole charlottae) is a species of songbird in the bulbul family, Pycnonotidae. It is found on Borneo in its natural habitat of subtropical or tropical moist lowland forests. It is threatened by habitat loss.

== Taxonomy and systematics ==
Charlotte's bulbul was originally described in the genus Criniger. It was split from the buff-vented bulbul by the IOC in 2017.
