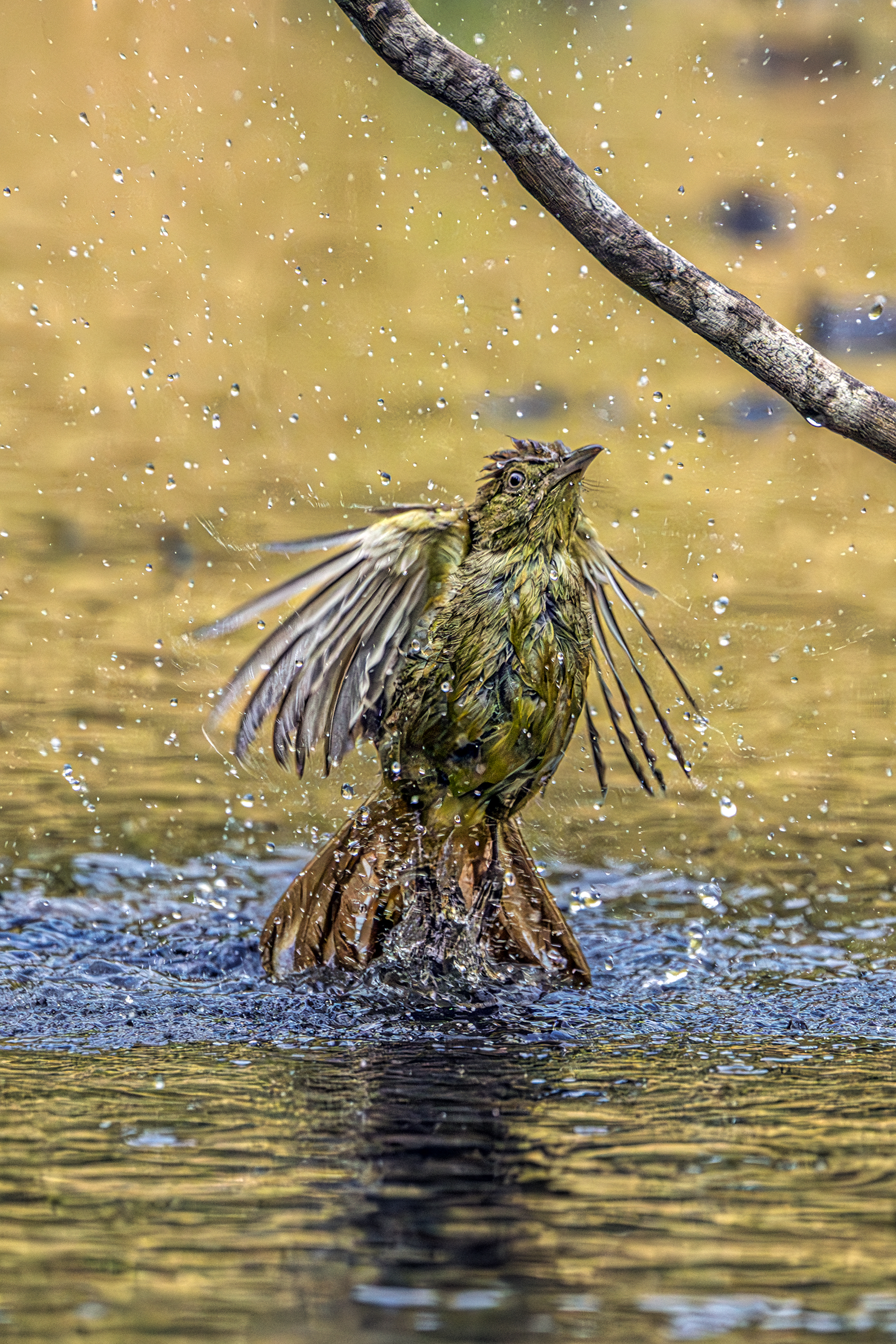

Scientific classification
- Kingdom: Animalia
- Phylum: Chordata
- Class: Aves
- Order: Passeriformes
- Family: Pycnonotidae
- Genus: Iole
- Species: I. cacharensis

Binomial name
- Iole cacharensis (Deignan, 1948)

Synonyms
- Hypsipetes virescens cacherensis; Hypsipetes viridescens cacharensis; Hypsipetes viridescens cacherensis; Iole virescens cacharensis; Iole virescens cacherensis; Iole viridescens cacharensis; Microscelis viridescens cacharensis

= Cachar bulbul =

Species of songbird

The Cachar bulbul (Iole cacharensis) is a species of songbird in the bulbul family, Pycnonotidae. It is found in north-eastern India and south-eastern Bangladesh. Originally described as a subspecies of the olive bulbul due to the similarities in the two species' appearance and vocalisations, the Cachar bulbul was split off as a separate species in 2017 on the basis of genetic data showing that the two bulbuls diverged 1.7 million years ago.

== Taxonomy ==
Originally described as a subspecies in 1948 of the olive bulbul, the Cachar bulbul is extremely similar in both morphology and vocalisations to that species. Despite these similarities, the two species are estimated to have diverged 1.7 million years ago. Consequently, the Cachar bulbul was split off and re-classified as a separate species by the IOC in 2017.

== Description ==
The Cachar bulbul is a small species of bulbul, reaching an average length of 18 cm (7.1 in) and an average mass of 22.7–24.4 g (0.80–0.86 oz). It is a dull, largely uniform bronze-olive in color, slightly paler on the underparts, with yellow throats and bellies.

== Distribution and habitat ==
The Cachar bulbul is a South Asian local endemic, being native to a small portion of northeastern India and southeastern Bangladesh. A lowland species found in the Barak River valley and the Garo Hills, it is known from the Bangladeshi divisions of Sylhet and Chittagong, as well as the Indian states of Assam, Tripura, and Meghalaya. It inhabits evergreen broadleaf forests and secondary forests and is generally seen below 300 m (980 ft).
