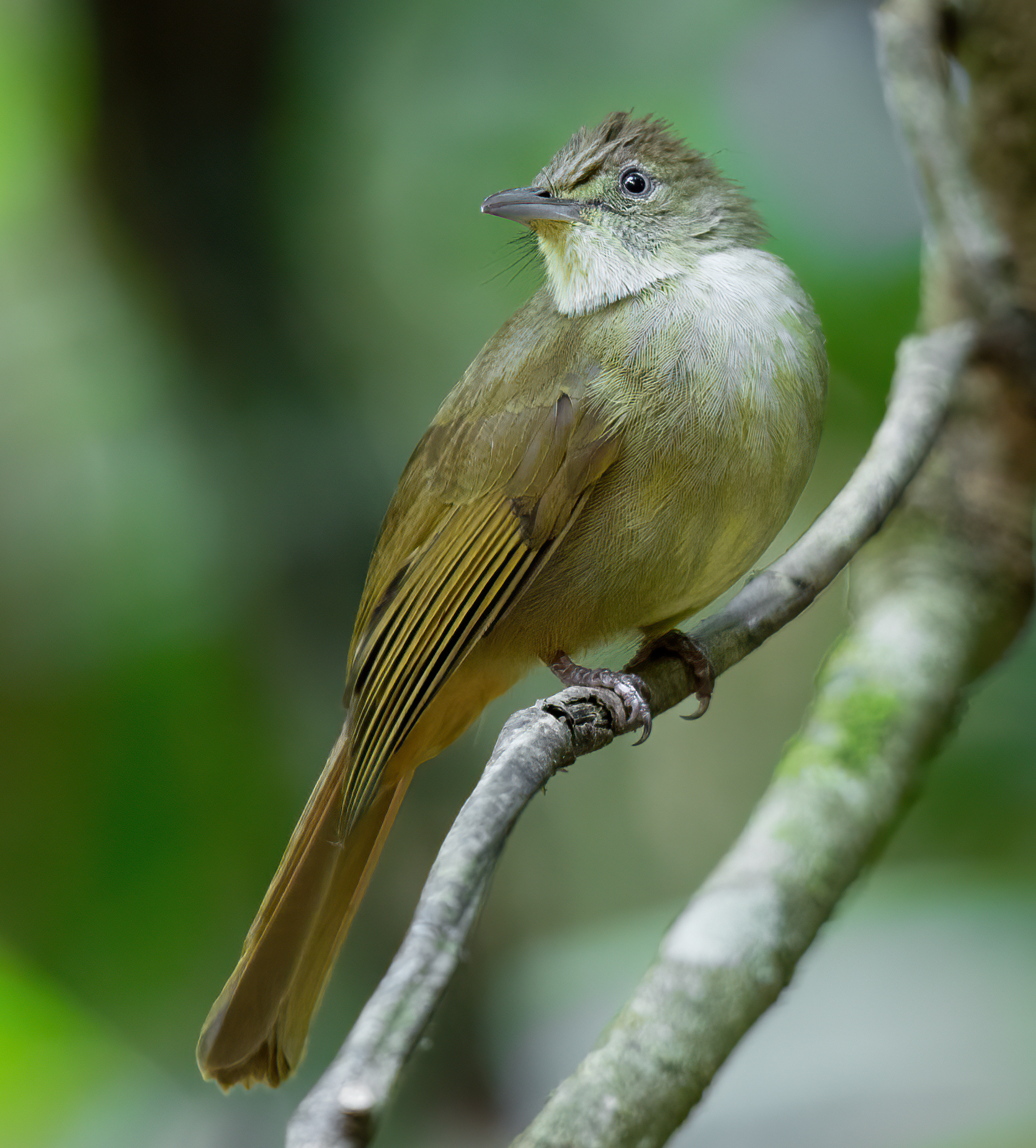

Conservation status
- Least Concern (IUCN 3.1)

Scientific classification
- Kingdom: Animalia
- Phylum: Chordata
- Class: Aves
- Order: Passeriformes
- Family: Pycnonotidae
- Genus: Iole
- Species: I. propinqua

Binomial name
- Iole propinqua (Oustalet, 1903)
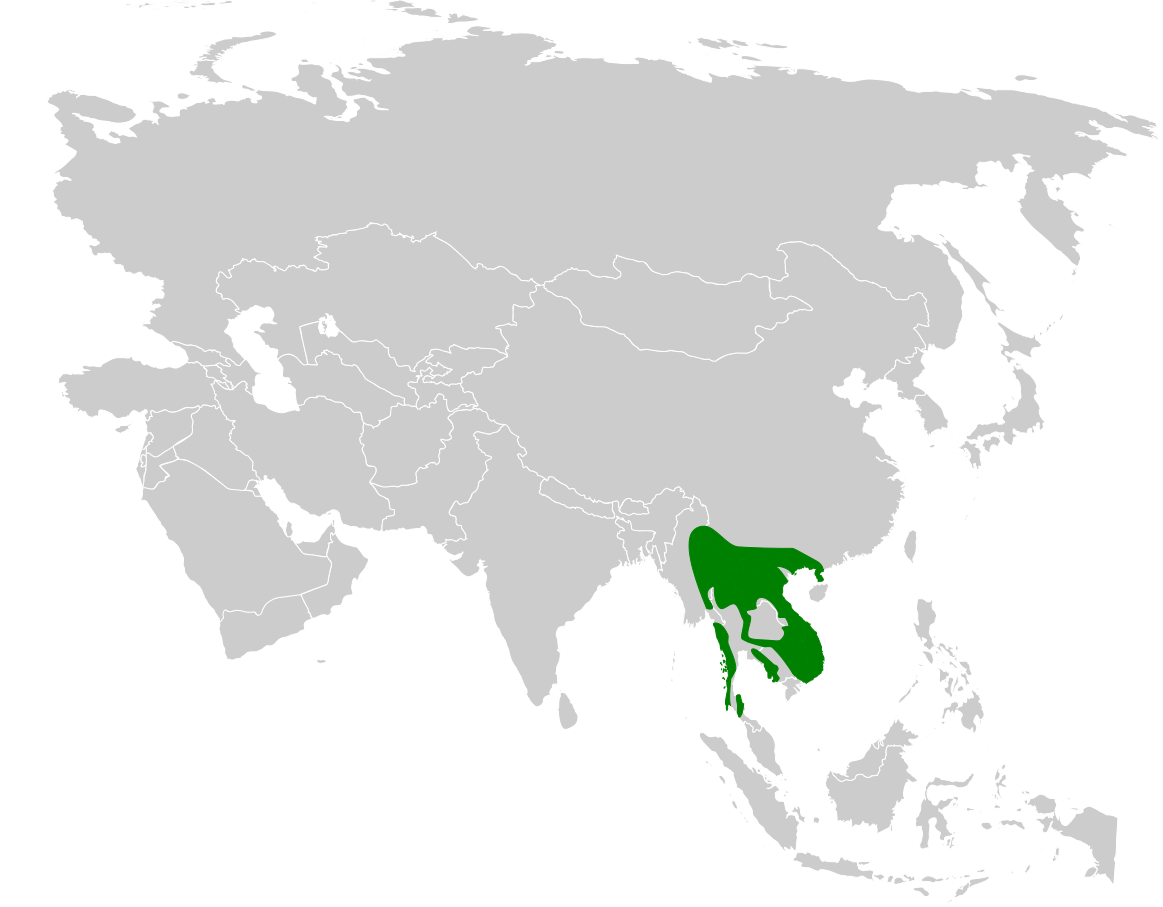

Synonyms
- Criniger propinquus; Hypsipetes propinquus

= Grey-eyed bulbul =

Species of songbird

The grey-eyed bulbul (Iole propinqua) is a species of songbird in the bulbul family, Pycnonotidae. It is found in Southeast Asia in its natural habitat of subtropical or tropical moist lowland forests.

== Taxonomy and systematics ==
The grey-eyed bulbul was originally described in the genus Criniger and classified by some authorities within the genus Hypsipetes.

=== Subspecies ===
Five subspecies are currently recognized:

- I. p. aquilonis - (Deignan, 1948) — southern China and north-eastern Vietnam
- I. p. propinqua - (Oustalet, 1903) — from eastern Myanmar to southern China, northern Thailand and northern Indochina
- I. p. simulator - (Deignan, 1948) — eastern Thailand and southern Indochina
- I. p. innectens - (Deignan, 1948) — far southern Vietnam
- I. p. myitkyinensis - (Deignan, 1948) — north-eastern and eastern Myanmar

== Gallery ==
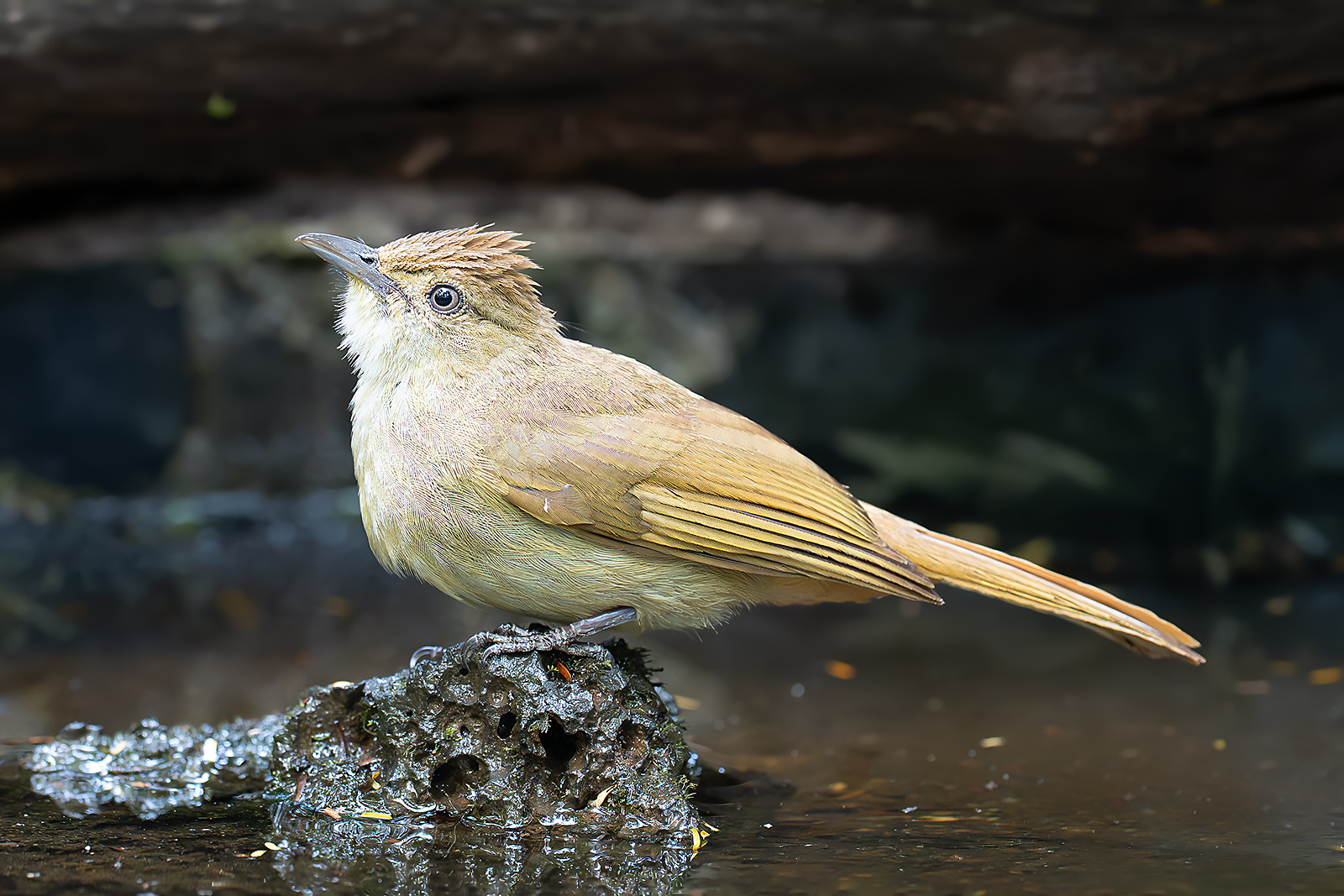
Found in Southeast Asia in its natural habitat of subtropical or tropical moist lowland forests
