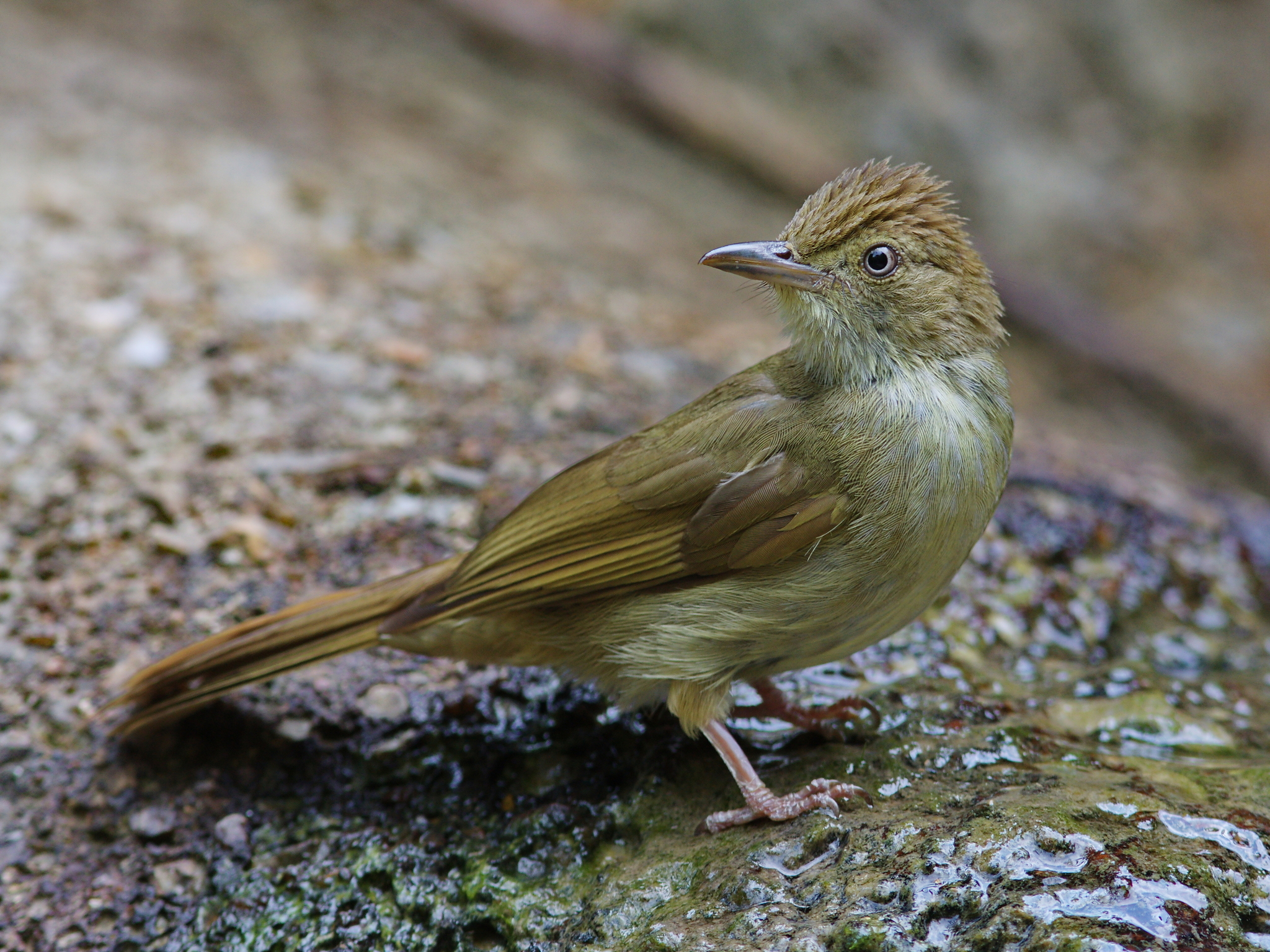

Conservation status
- Least Concern (IUCN 3.1)

Scientific classification
- Kingdom: Animalia
- Phylum: Chordata
- Class: Aves
- Order: Passeriformes
- Family: Pycnonotidae
- Genus: Iole
- Species: I. viridescens

Binomial name
- Iole viridescens Blyth, 1867
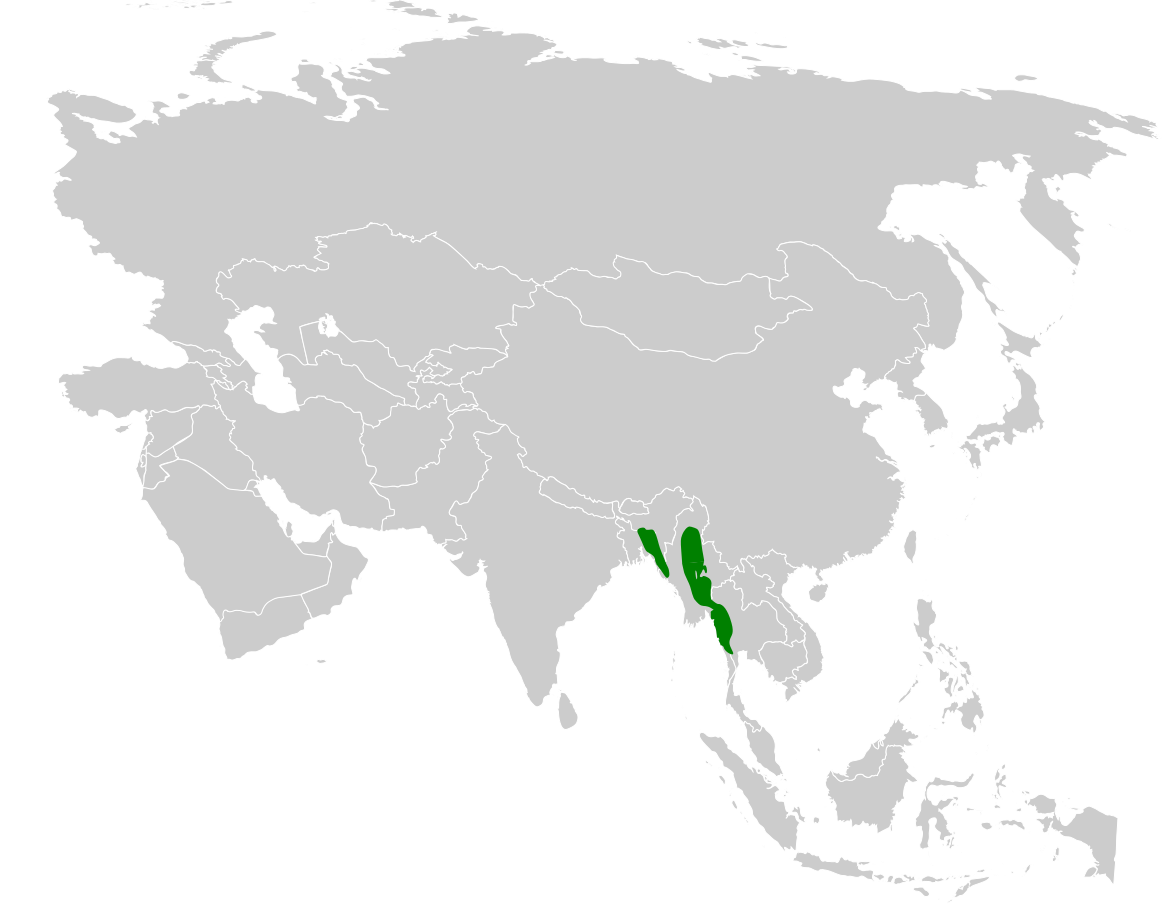

Synonyms
- Hypsipetes virescens; Hypsipetes viridescens; Iole virescens; Microscelis viridescens

= Olive bulbul =

Species of songbird

The olive bulbul (Iole viridescens) is a species of songbird in the bulbul family, Pycnonotidae. It is found from southern Myanmar to south-western Thailand and the Malay Peninsula. Its natural habitats are subtropical or tropical moist lowland forests and subtropical or tropical moist montane forests.

== Taxonomy and systematics ==
Formerly, the olive bulbul was classified in the genera Microscelis and Hypsipetes by some authorities. The synonym Hypsipetes virescens has also been used for the Nicobar bulbul and the Sunda bulbul. Alternative names for the olive bulbul include Blyth's olive bulbul, Sumatran bulbul, and viridescent bulbul. The name 'olive bulbul' is also used as an alternative name by the yellow-bearded greenbul and the sulphur-bellied bulbul.

=== Subspecies ===
Three subspecies are currently recognized. The Cachar bulbul was also considered as a subspecies of the olive bulbul until it was split off and re-classified as a separate species by the IOC in 2017:

- Iole viridescens viridescens - Blyth, 1867: Found in southern Myanmar and south-western Thailand
- Iole viridescens lekhakuni - (Deignan, 1954): Found in southern Myanmar and south-western Thailand
- Iole viridescens cinnamomeoventris - Baker, ECS, 1917: Found on northern and central Malay Peninsula
