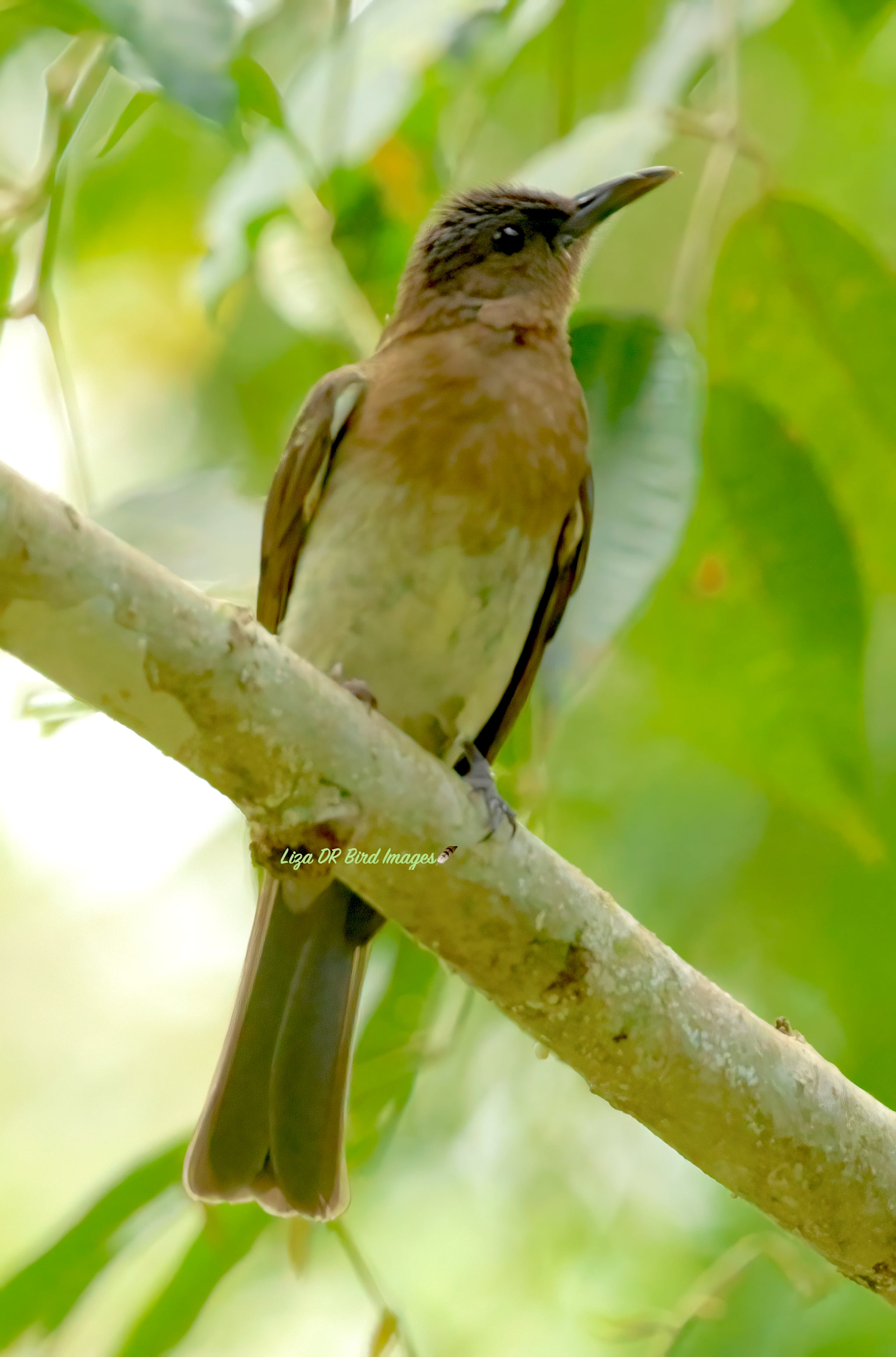

Conservation status
- Near Threatened (IUCN 3.1)

Scientific classification
- Kingdom: Animalia
- Phylum: Chordata
- Class: Aves
- Order: Passeriformes
- Family: Pycnonotidae
- Genus: Hypsipetes
- Species: H. rufigularis

Binomial name
- Hypsipetes rufigularis Sharpe, 1877
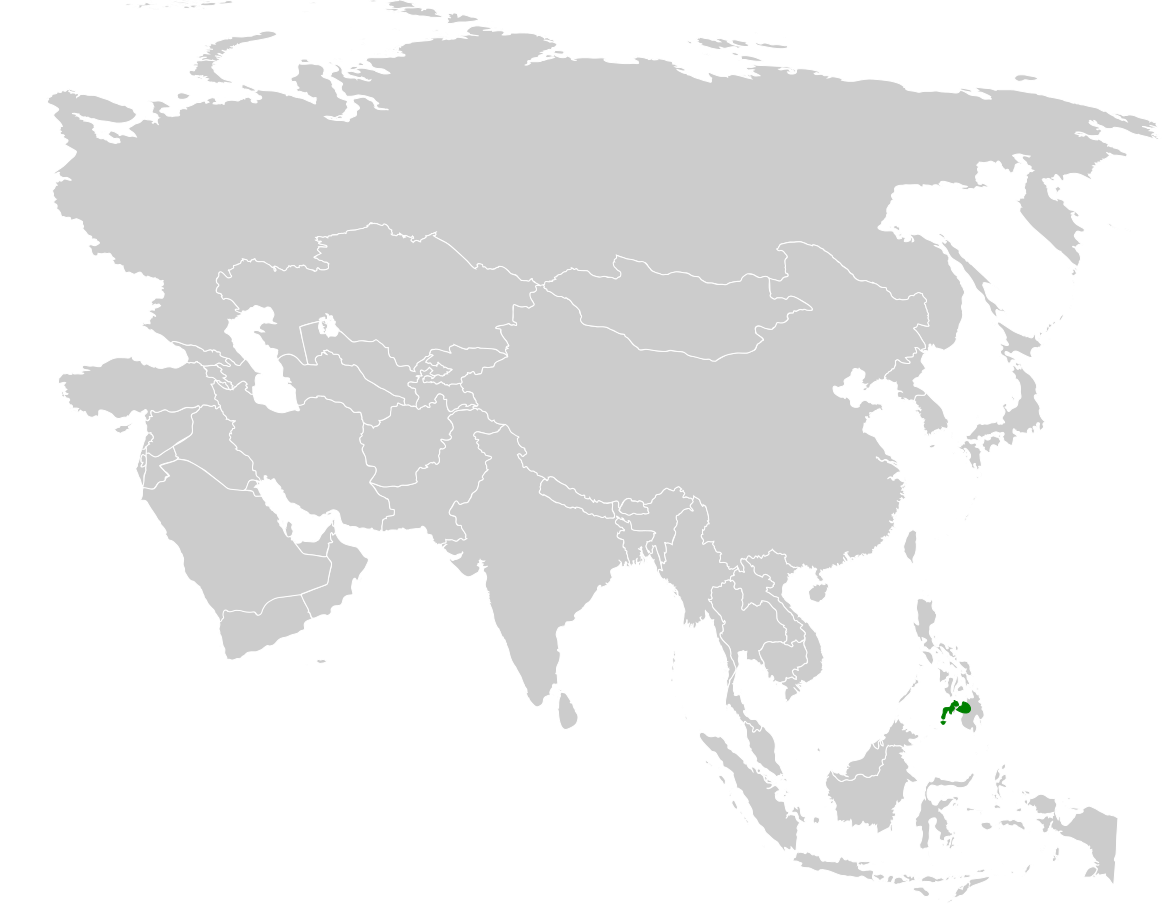

Synonyms
- Hypsipetes philippinus rufigularis; Iole rufigularis; Ixos rufigularis

= Zamboanga bulbul =

Species of bird

The Zamboanga bulbul (Hypsipetes rufigularis) is a songbird species in the bulbul family, Pycnonotidae. It is endemic to the Philippines, where its natural habitat is tropical moist lowland forests of Basilan and the Zamboanga Peninsula. It is becoming rare due to habitat loss.

== Description and taxonomy ==
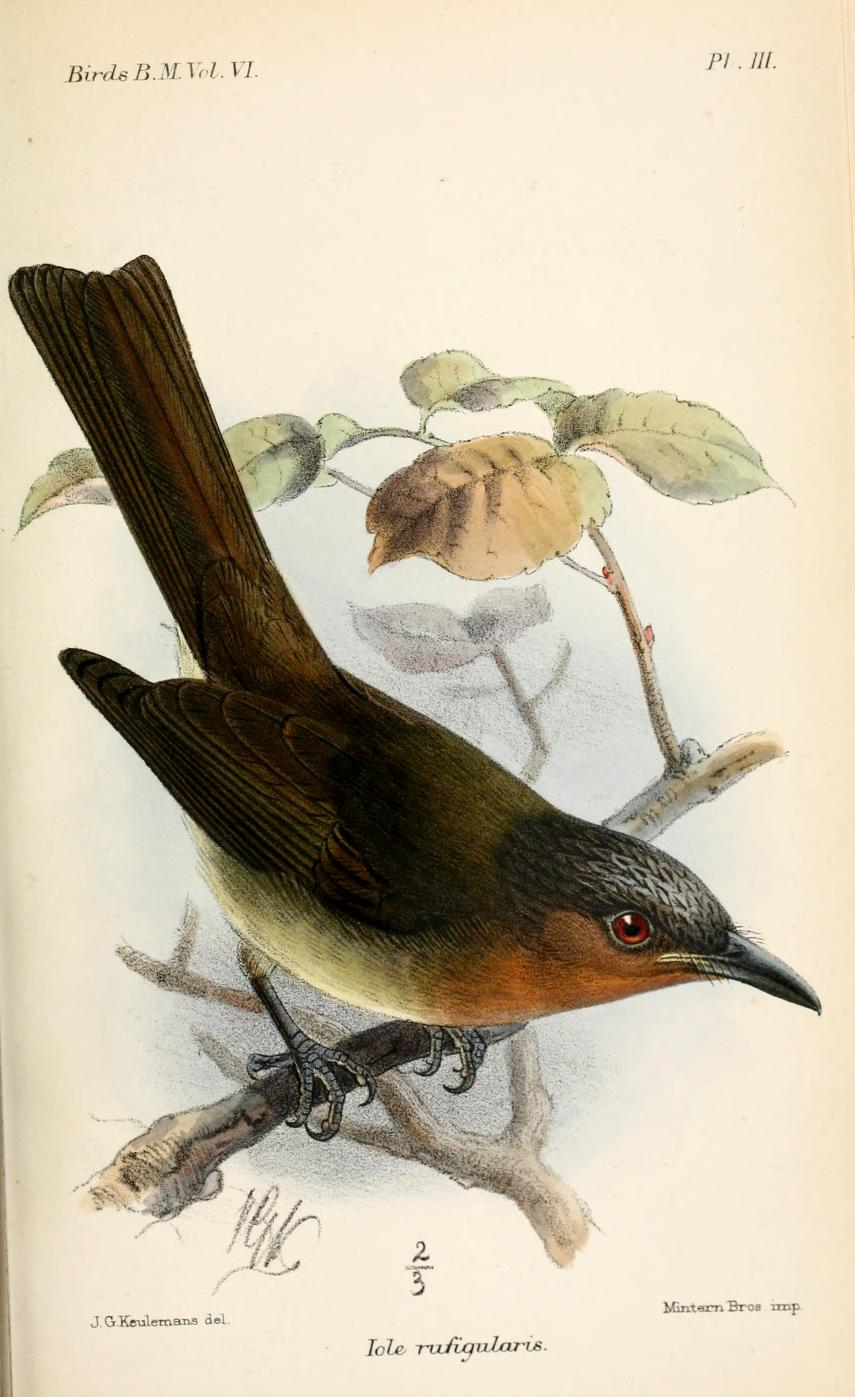
Illustration by Keulemans, 1881

The Zamboanga bulbul was originally described in the genus Hypsipetes and later placed in the genus Ixos. Formerly, some authorities classified the Zamboanga bulbul in the genus Iole and also considered it to be a subspecies of the Philippine bulbul. In 2010, it was returned to the genus Hypsipetes. It is differentiated by its much larger size and lack of streaking on its throat.

== Ecology and behavior ==
Often observed visiting and feeding on fruiting trees. Pressumed to supplement diet with insects.

Nothing is known about its reproductive behaviour.

== Habitat and conservation status ==
Found in primary and mature secondary forest. It is most common in intact forest.

IUCN has assessed this bird as a near-threatened due to its smaller range. It is still relatively conmmon but forests in the Philippines have experienced rapid habitat destruction.

Found in the protected area of Pasonanca Natural Park but still continues to experience encroachment.
