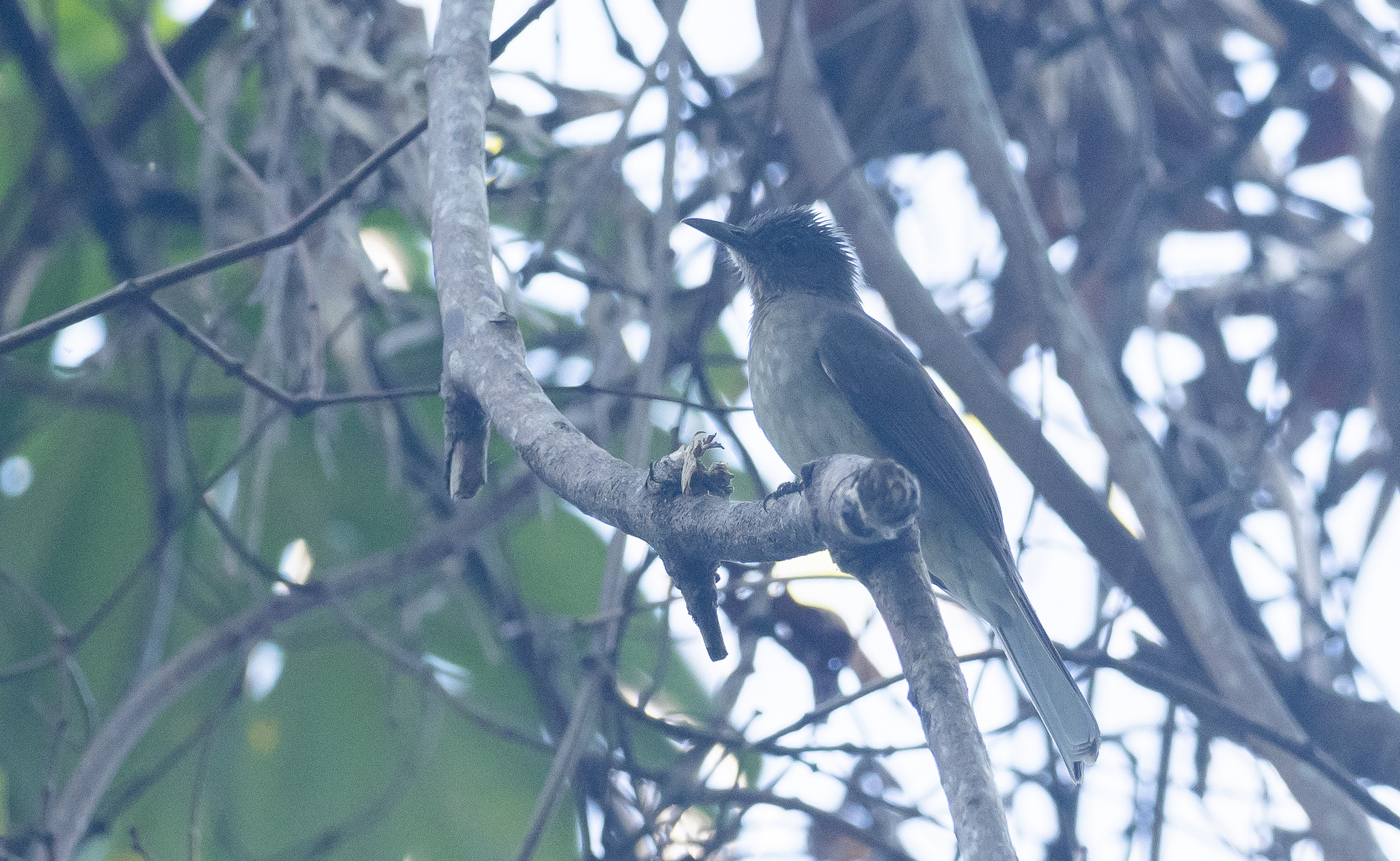

Scientific classification
- Kingdom: Animalia
- Phylum: Chordata
- Class: Aves
- Order: Passeriformes
- Family: Pycnonotidae
- Genus: Hypsipetes
- Species: H. mindorensis

Binomial name
- Hypsipetes mindorensis (Steere, 1890)

Synonyms
- Hypsipetes philippinus mindorensis; Iole Mindorensis; Ixos mindorensis; Ixos philippinus mindorensis

= Mindoro bulbul =

Species of bird

The Mindoro bulbul (Hypsipetes mindorensis) is a songbird species in the bulbul family, Pycnonotidae. It is endemic to Mindoro in the Philippines. Its natural habitats are tropical moist lowland forests and tropical moist montane forests. It was formerly considered a subspecies of Philippine bulbul but was recognized as a distinct species in 2010.

== Description and taxonomy ==
The Mindoro bulbul was originally described in the genus Iole and has also been classified by some authorities as a separate species in the genus Ixos. Until 2010, it was considered to be a subspecies of the Philippine bulbul. It is differentiated by its voice, larger bill and generally darker plumage.

== Ecology and behavior ==
Not much is known about this newly separated species. It is believed to be similar to the Philippine bulbul which is a generalist feeding on fruits, flowers and insects. Usually found singly or in pairs foraging the understorey and the canopy.

The Philippine bulbul has been recorded breeding from January to July. Nest has been described as cup-shaped made of mixed grasses, roots, twigs and leaves all woven together with spider webs and coocoon silk. Clutch size is 2 to 3 eggs.

== Habitat and conservation status ==
It inhabits mainly tropical moist lowland forest but has been known to inhabit moist montane forest up to 2,000 meters above sea level, and has been to known to visit cultivated areas.

The International Union for Conservation of Nature does not yet recognize the Mindoro bulbul as its own species yet. It is generally believed that due to its tolerance for habitat and general commonness that this species is not threatened - making it the only Mindoro endemic bird that isn't threatened.

The forests of Mindoro threatened by habitat loss through legal and illegal logging, mining, road construction, slash-and-burn or kaingin and trapping for both food and the pet trade. By 1988, extensive deforestation on Mindoro had reduced forest cover to a mere 120 km^{2}, of which only a small proportion is below this species's upper altitudinal limit. The lowland forest that does remain is highly fragmented. Slash-and-burn cultivation, occasional selective logging and rattan collection threaten the forest fragments that still support the species. Dynamite blasting for marble is an additional threat to forest at Puerto Galera. While the bulbul might be able to survive this habitat loss better, the other species may continue to suffer.
