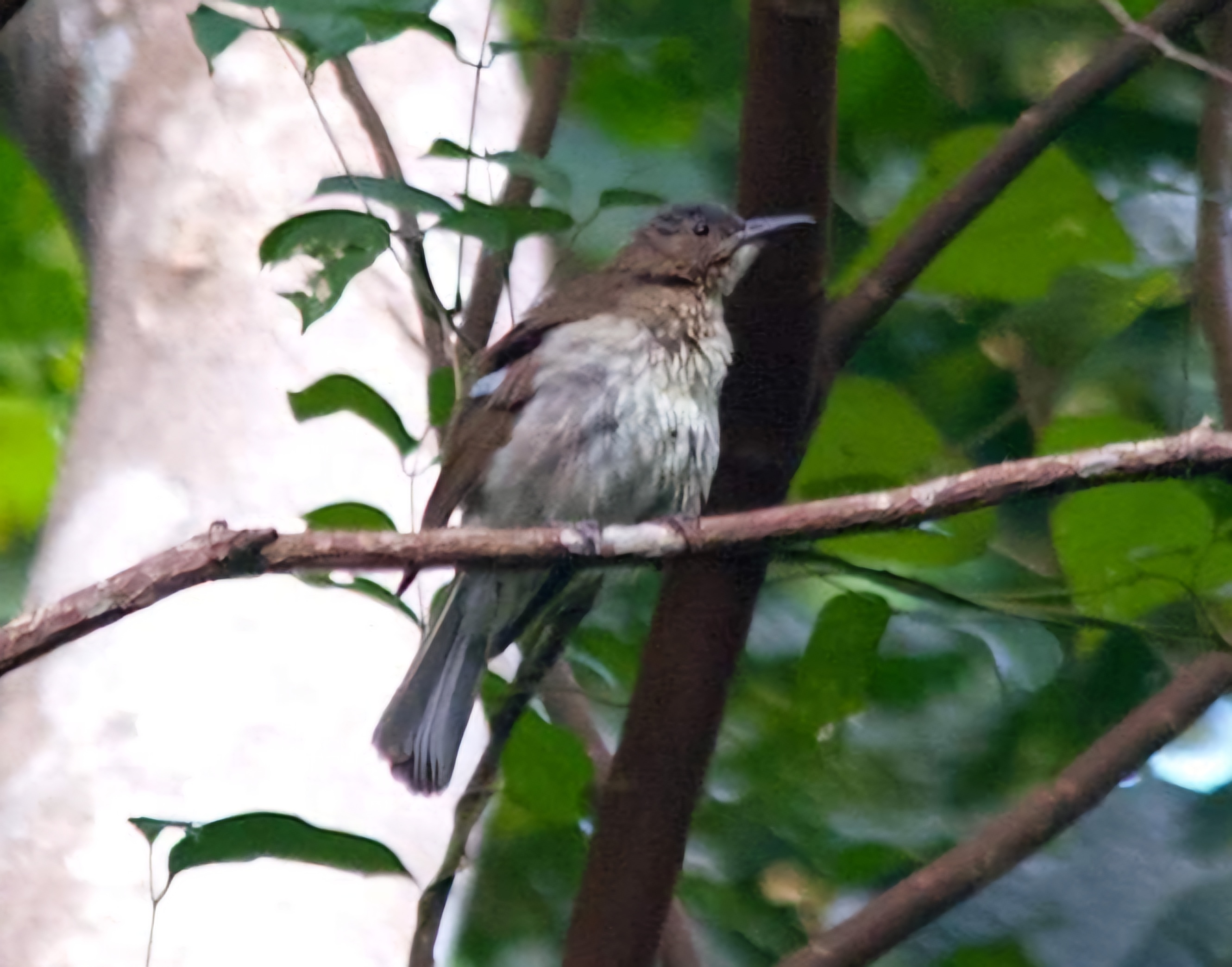

Scientific classification
- Kingdom: Animalia
- Phylum: Chordata
- Class: Aves
- Order: Passeriformes
- Family: Pycnonotidae
- Genus: Hypsipetes
- Species: H. siquijorensis
- Subspecies: H. s. cinereiceps

Trinomial name
- Hypsipetes siquijorensis cinereiceps Bourns & Worcester, 1894

= Tablas bulbul =

Subspecies of bird

The Tablas bulbul (Hypsipetes siquijorensis cinereiceps) also known as the Romblon bulbul or the Tablas streak-breasted bulbul is a subspecies of the streak-breasted bulbul. It is endemic to the Philippines found only on the islands of Romblon and Tablas Island where its natural habitat is tropical moist lowland forest. It is threatened by habitat loss and hunting. It is likely that this will eventually be split into a separate species and assessed as critically endangered.

== Description and taxonomy ==
Relative to the Siquijor streak-breasted bulbul, this bird has a gray crown, white throat, light brown breast and has broader and white streaking.

Its calls are described as "strident whip-like "whit" with grinding notes. It also has a call that has been described to be like a squeaky toy.

== Habitat and conservation status ==
This species' habitat is primary lowland forest and forest edge. It is able to tolerate degraded secondary forest and scrub but in lower densities.

IUCN has assessed the streak-breasted bulbul as a whole as endangered with population estimates being 2,500 to 9,999 mature individuals and continuing to decrease. Most of this estimate is of the nominate subspecies. This species is common wherever there is suitable habitat but Tablas Island and Romblon have mostly been deforested in the past century.

This species' main threat is habitat loss with wholesale clearance of forest habitats as a result of legal and illegal logging, and conversion into farmlands through Slash-and-burn and other methods. Mt Palaupau serves as a watershed for Tablas Island. There are reportedly very few registered forest patches that exceed 100 hectares, and apparently a complete lack of mature forest in the south of the island

There are no species specific conservation programs going on at the moment but conservation actions proposed include more species surveys to better understand habitat and population. initiate education and awareness campaigns to raise the species's profile and instill pride in locals. Lobby for protection of remaining forest and assess feasibility of reforestation projects.
