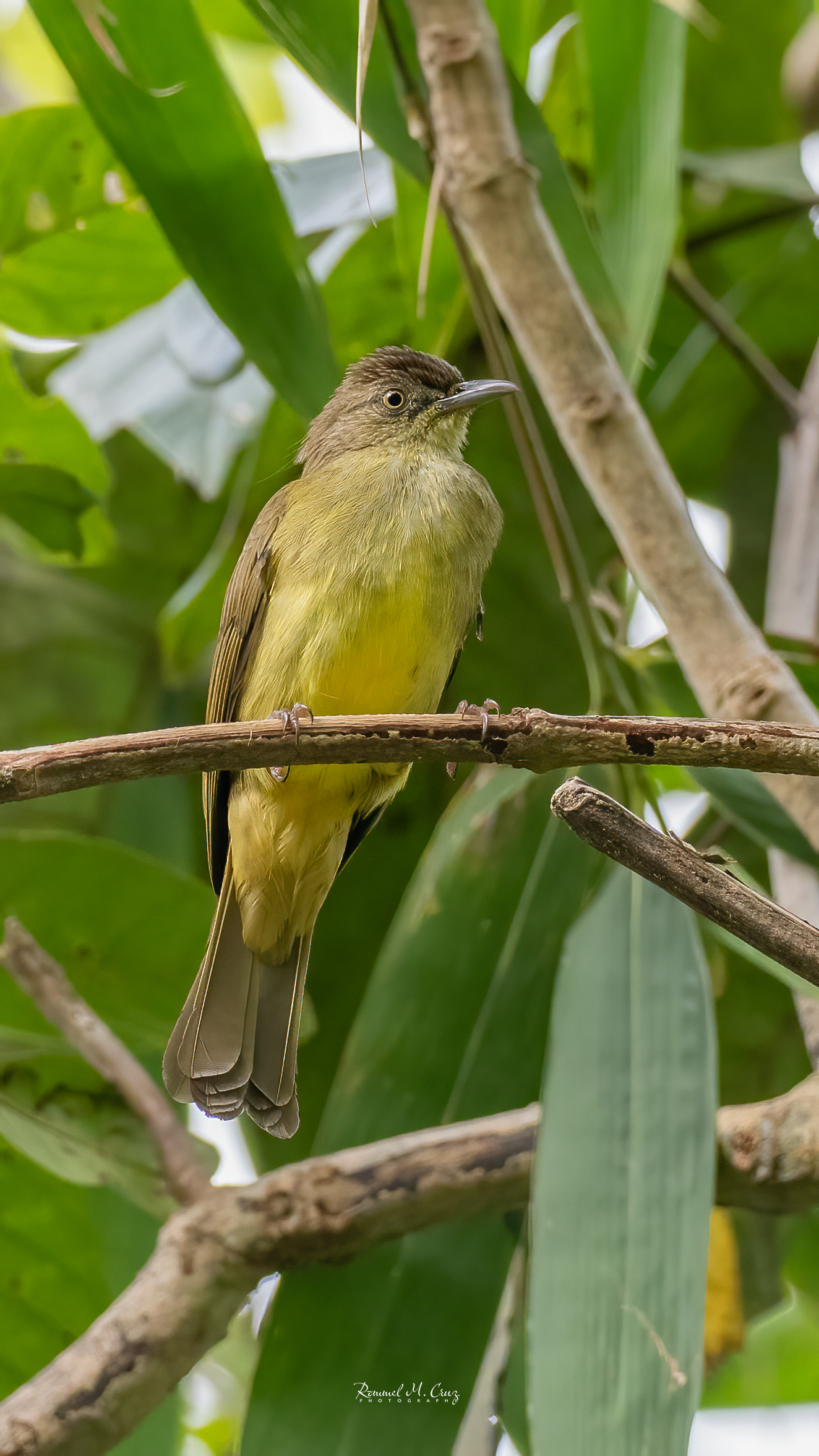

Conservation status
- Least Concern (IUCN 3.1)

Scientific classification
- Kingdom: Animalia
- Phylum: Chordata
- Class: Aves
- Order: Passeriformes
- Family: Pycnonotidae
- Genus: Iole
- Species: I. palawanensis

Binomial name
- Iole palawanensis (Tweeddale, 1878)

Synonyms
- Criniger palawanensis; Hypsipetes palawanensis; Ixos palawanensis

= Sulphur-bellied bulbul =

Species of bird

The sulphur-bellied bulbul (Iole palawanensis) is a songbird species in the bulbul family, Pycnonotidae. It is endemic to Palawan (Philippines). Its natural habitat is tropical moist lowland forests.

== Description and taxonomy ==
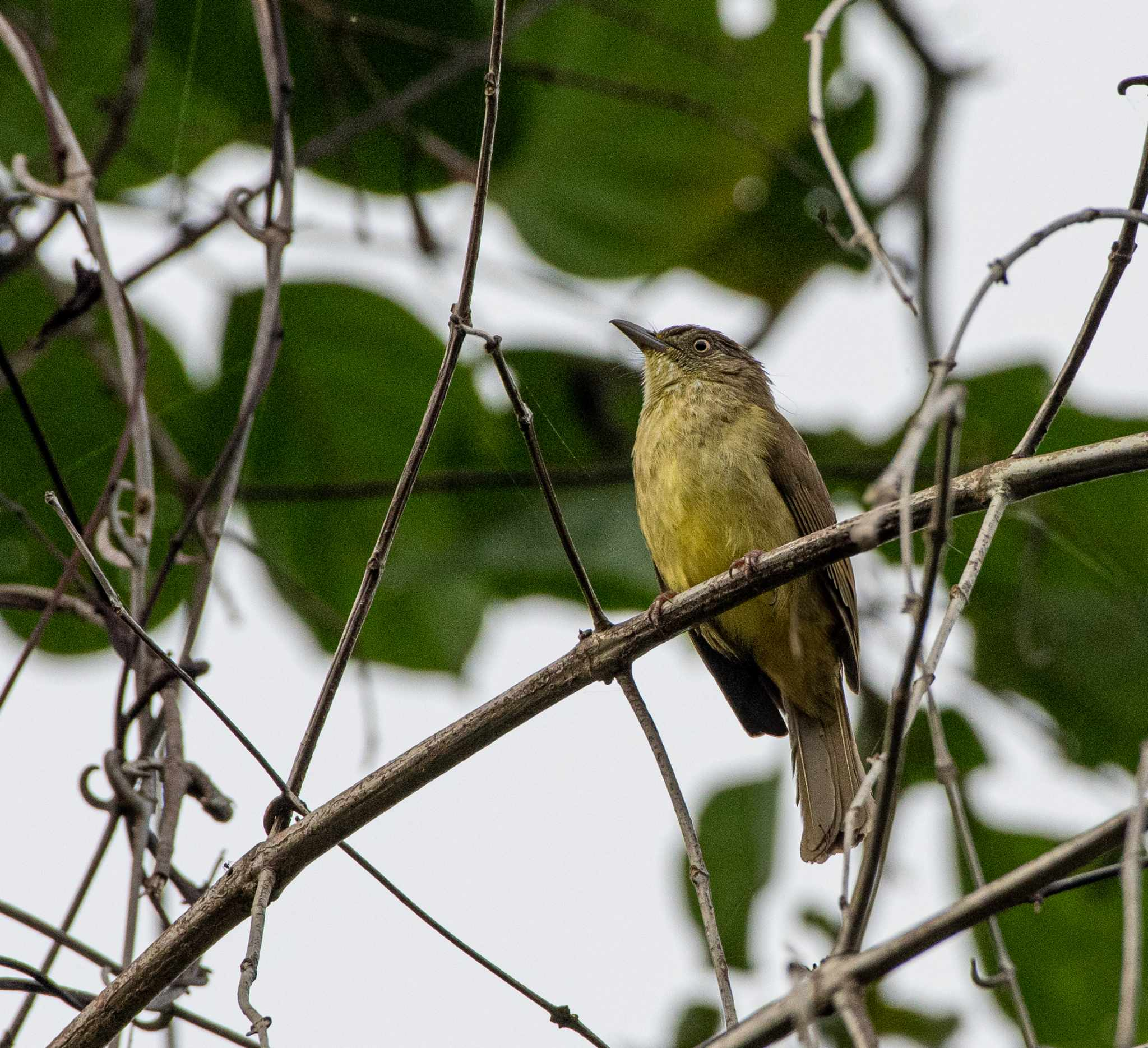
A sulphur-bellied bulbul in Port Barton

The sulphur-bellied bulbul was originally described in the genus Criniger. Some authorities have classified the sulphur-bellied bulbul in the genera Hypsipetes and Ixos. Alternate names for the sulphur-bellied bulbul include the golden-eyed bulbul and olive bulbul. The latter name should not be confused with the species bearing the same name, Iole virescens

== Ecology and behavior ==
Not much is known about its diet but it is presumed to be the typical bulbul diet of fruit and insects. Found single, in pairs or small flocks.

Birds collected in breeding condition with enlarged gonads in April. Nest and eggs are undescribed.

== Habitat and conservation status ==
Its habitat is primary lowland forest, secondary growth and forest edge.

It is assessed as least-concern species under the International Union for Conservation of Nature with the population decreasing. Palawan's forests are under threat due to illegal logging, deforestation, land conversion and mining. The whole of Palawan was designated as a Biosphere Reserve; however, protection and enforcement of laws has been difficult and these threats still continue. It occurs in just one protected area in the Iwahig Prison and Penal Farm.
