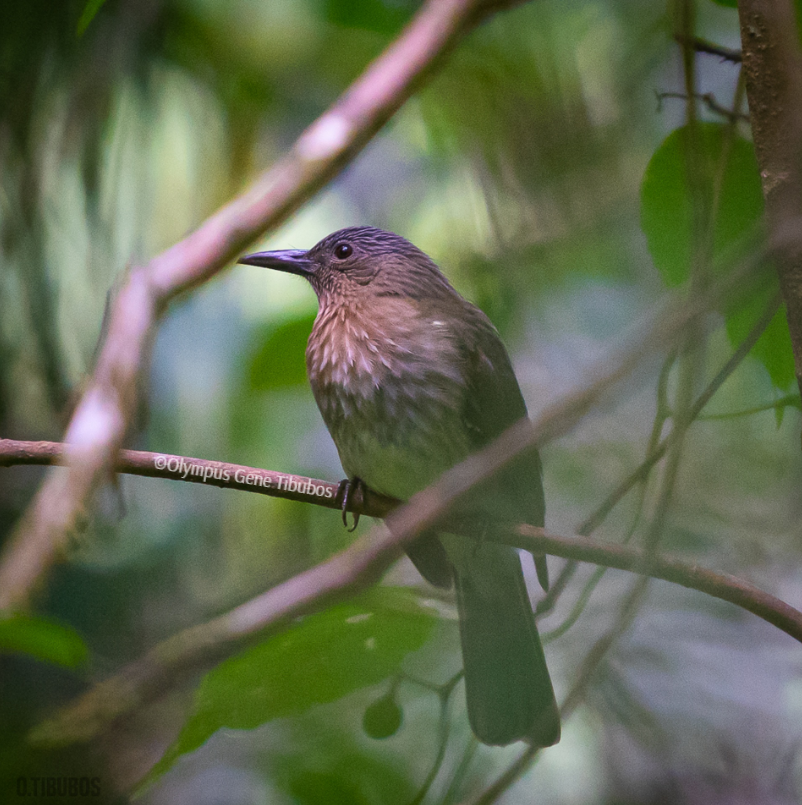

Scientific classification
- Kingdom: Animalia
- Phylum: Chordata
- Class: Aves
- Order: Passeriformes
- Family: Pycnonotidae
- Genus: Hypsipetes
- Species: H. guimarasensis

Binomial name
- Hypsipetes guimarasensis (Steere, 1890)

Synonyms
- Hypsipetes philippinus guimarasensis; Iole Guimarasensis; Ixos guimarasensis; Ixos philippinus guimarasensis

= Visayan bulbul =

Species of bird

The Visayan bulbul (Hypsipetes guimarasensis) or Steere's bulbul, is a songbird species in the bulbul family, Pycnonotidae.

It is endemic to the western Visayas in the Philippines. Its natural habitats are subtropical or tropical moist lowland forests and subtropical or tropical moist montane forests. Until 2010, it was considered to be a subspecies of the Philippine bulbul.

== Description and taxonomy ==
The Visayan bulbul was originally described in the genus Iole and has also been classified by some authorities as a separate species in the genus Ixos. Until 2010, it was considered to be a subspecies of the Philippine bulbul but others still maintain that this is just a sub-species.

== Ecology and behavior ==
Not much is known about this newly separated species. It is believed to be similar to the Philippine bulbul which is a generalist feeding on fruits, flowers and insects. Usually found singly or in pairs foraging the understorey and the canopy.

The Philippine bulbul has been recorded breeding from January to July. Nest has been described as cup-shaped made of mixed grasses, roots, twigs and leaves all woven together with spider webs and coocoon silk. Clutch size is 2 to 3 eggs.

== Habitat and conservation status ==
It is adaptable to a wide range of habitats including primary and secondary forest, shrubby clearings and even cultivated areas (provided there's still some tree cover). It is found in both lowland and montane areas up to 2,000 m ASL.

The IUCN Red List views this as a subspecies. While there is no formal evaluation for the Visayan bulbul, its adaptability to multiple habitats make it an abundant bird.
