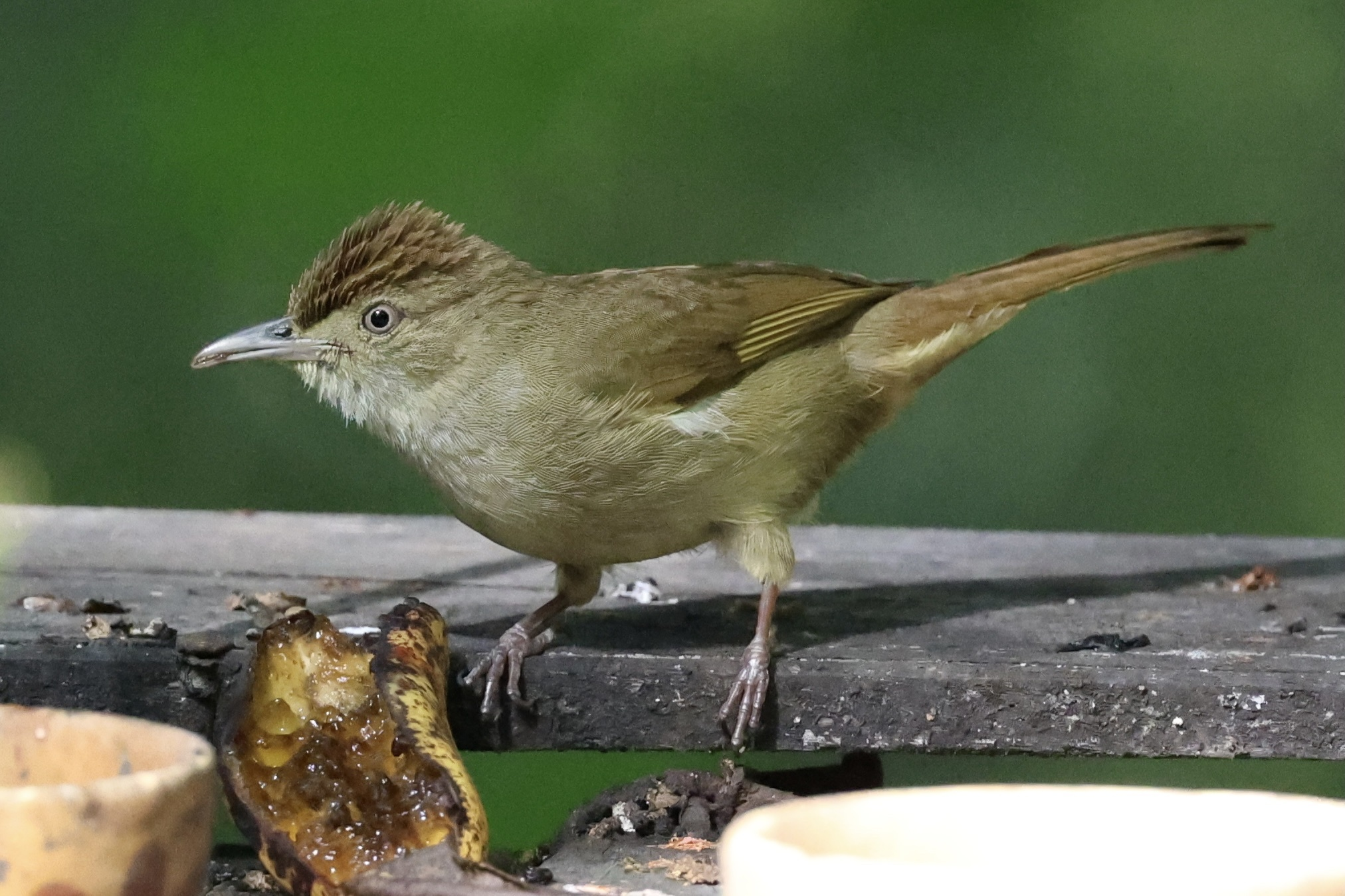
- Nopphitam district, Nakhon Si Thammarat, Thailand

Conservation status
- Near Threatened (IUCN 3.1)

Scientific classification
- Kingdom: Animalia
- Phylum: Chordata
- Class: Aves
- Order: Passeriformes
- Family: Pycnonotidae
- Genus: Iole
- Species: I. crypta

Binomial name
- Iole crypta Oberholser, 1918

Synonyms
- Hypsipetes charlottae; Hypsipetes olivacea; Iole charlottae; Iole olivacea; Microscelis charlottae

= Buff-vented bulbul =

Species of songbird

The buff-vented bulbul (Iole crypta) is a species of songbird in the bulbul family, Pycnonotidae. It is found in south-eastern Myanmar, south-western Thailand, on the Malay Peninsula, Sumatra and nearby islands. Its natural habitat is subtropical or tropical moist lowland forests. It is threatened by habitat loss.

== Taxonomy and systematics ==
The former scientific name, Iole olivacea Blyth, 1844, has now been ruled as permanently invalid by the IOC. Some authorities have classified the buff-vented bulbul in the genera Hypsipetes and Microscelis. Formerly, Charlotte's bulbul was considered as conspecific with the buff-vented bulbul until split by the IOC in 2017. Alternate names for the buff-vented bulbul include the crested olive bulbul, dull-brown bulbul and Finsch's olive bulbul.

== Description ==
The buff-vented bulbul is a medium-sized and fairly long-billed bulbul, growing to an average length of 20–20.5 cm (7.9–8.1 in) and an average weight of 20–28 g (0.71–0.99 oz). Rather drab in its appearance, it is largely dull olive brown in colour, with a darker, more reddish crown, smoky grey to ash-brown face, and ashy sides. Its crown can look like a spiky crest when it raises its feathers. The underparts are lighter in color than the rest of the body and the undertail coverts are yellow-buff with dark brown centres.

The buff-vented bulbul is extremely similar to the smaller and shorter-billed olive bulbul, which is best told apart by its cinnamon-washed undertail-coverts, which have no dark centres. Other brownish bulbuls that share the buff-vented's range largely lack its spiky crown.
