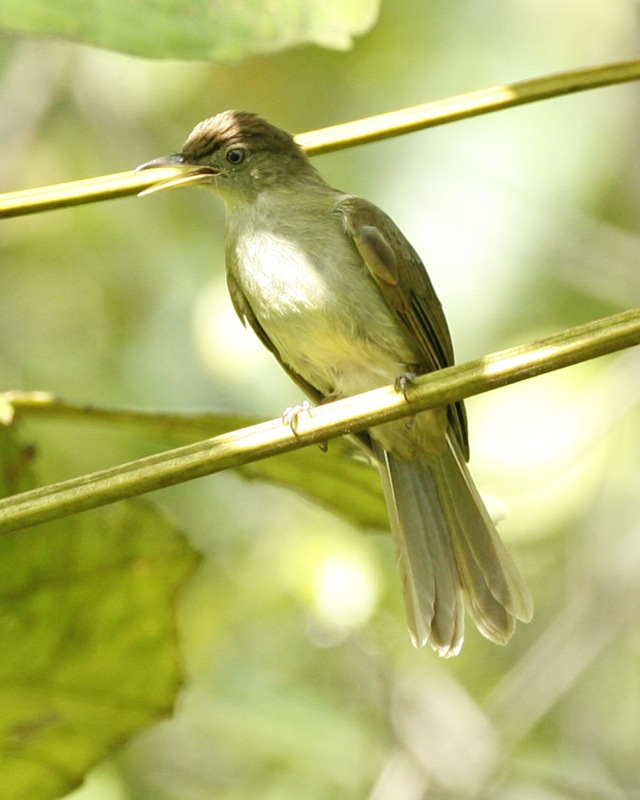
- Buff-vented bulbul (Iole crypta)

Scientific classification
- Kingdom: Animalia
- Phylum: Chordata
- Class: Aves
- Order: Passeriformes
- Family: Pycnonotidae
- Genus: Iole; Blyth, 1844

Type species
- Iole olivacea Blyth, 1844

= Iole (bird) =

Genus of birds

Iole is a genus of songbirds in the bulbul family, Pycnonotidae. They are native to tropical eastern Asia, from India to China and south through Southeast Asia to northern Indonesia.

== Taxonomy ==
The genus Iole was introduced in 1844 by the English zoologist Edward Blyth to accommodate a single species, Iole olivacea Blyth, 1844. This is the type species of the genus. This species was moved to the genus Hypsipetes, together with Hypsipetes olivaceus that had been introduced in 1837 by the English naturalists William Jardine and Prideaux John Selby. Under the rules of the International Commission on Zoological Nomenclature (ICZN), Iole olivacea Blyth, 1844 became a junior secondary homonym and is therefore permanently invalid, even now that the taxa are no longer considered congenic. The name Iole olivacea Blyth, 1844 has been replaced by Iole olivacea crypta Oberholser, 1918, which is now treated as a full species, the buff-vented bulbul.

Although this genus was formerly merged into Hypsipetes, molecular phylogenetic analyses indicate that these two lineages are not each other's closest relative.

=== Species ===
The genus contains the following seven species:

Image	Common name	Scientific name	Distribution
	Finsch's bulbul	Iole finschii	Malaysia
	Sulphur-bellied bulbul	Iole palawanensis	Palawan
	Olive bulbul	Iole viridescens	Northeast India and western Indochina
	Buff-vented bulbul	Iole crypta	Thailand, Malay peninsula and Sumatra
	Charlotte's bulbul	Iole charlottae	Borneo
	Cachar bulbul	Iole cacharensis	Northeast India and Bangladesh
	Grey-eyed bulbul	Iole propinqua	Indochina and adjacent southern China

=== Former species ===
Formerly, some authorities also considered the following species (or subspecies) as species within the genus Iole:

- Yellow-browed bulbul (as Iole indica)
- Yellow-browed bulbul (icterica) (as Iole icterica)
- Cinereous bulbul (as Iole cinerea)
- Mindoro bulbul (as Iole Mindorensis)
- Visayan bulbul (as Iole Guimarasensis)
- Zamboanga bulbul (as Iole rufigularis)
- Streak-breasted bulbul (as Iole siquijorensis)
- Romblon bulbul (as Iole cinereiceps)
- Cebu bulbul (as Iole monticola)
