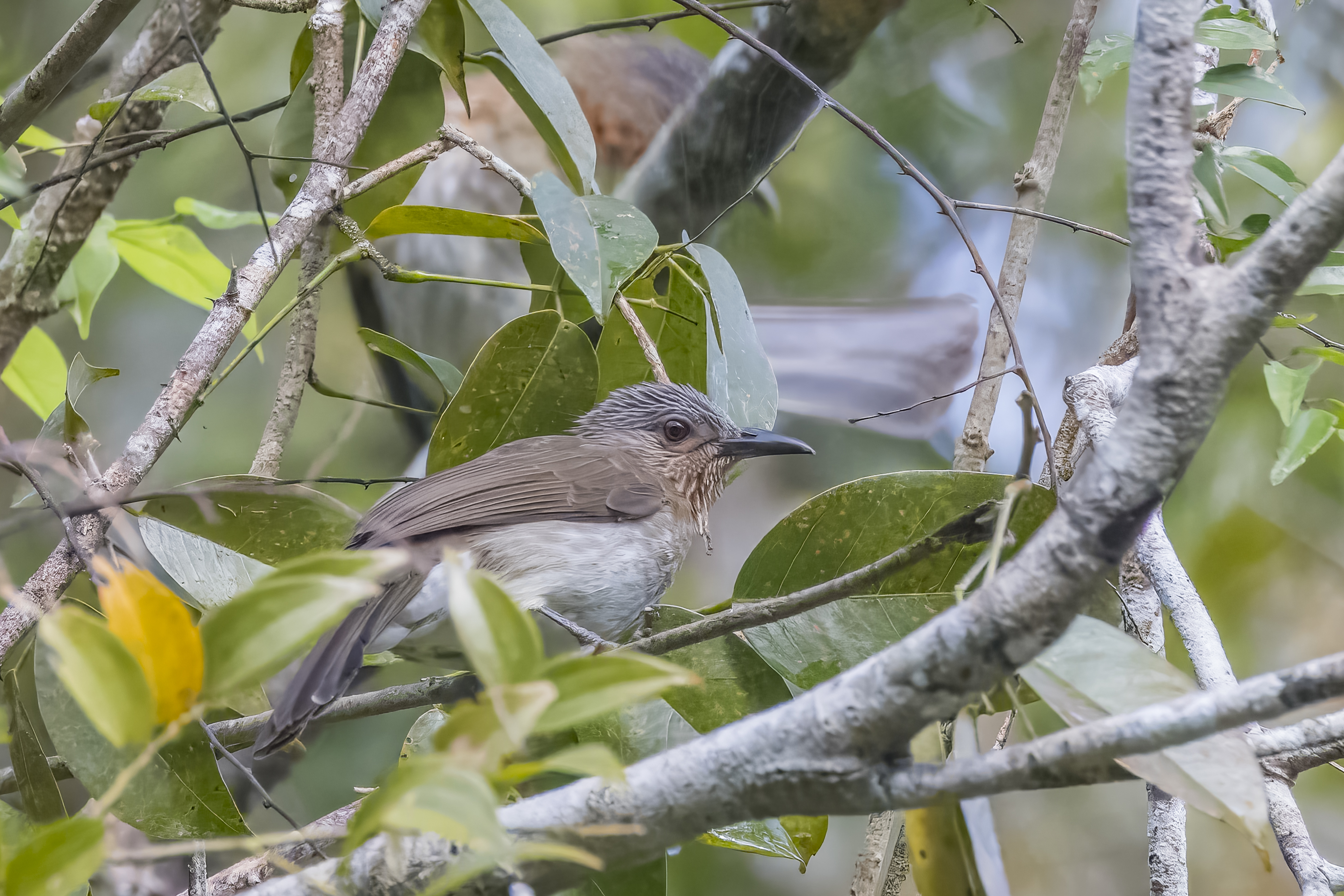
- Hypsipetes philippinus saturatior, Bohol

Conservation status
- Least Concern (IUCN 3.1)

Scientific classification
- Kingdom: Animalia
- Phylum: Chordata
- Class: Aves
- Order: Passeriformes
- Family: Pycnonotidae
- Genus: Hypsipetes
- Species: H. philippinus

Binomial name
- Hypsipetes philippinus (Forster, 1795)
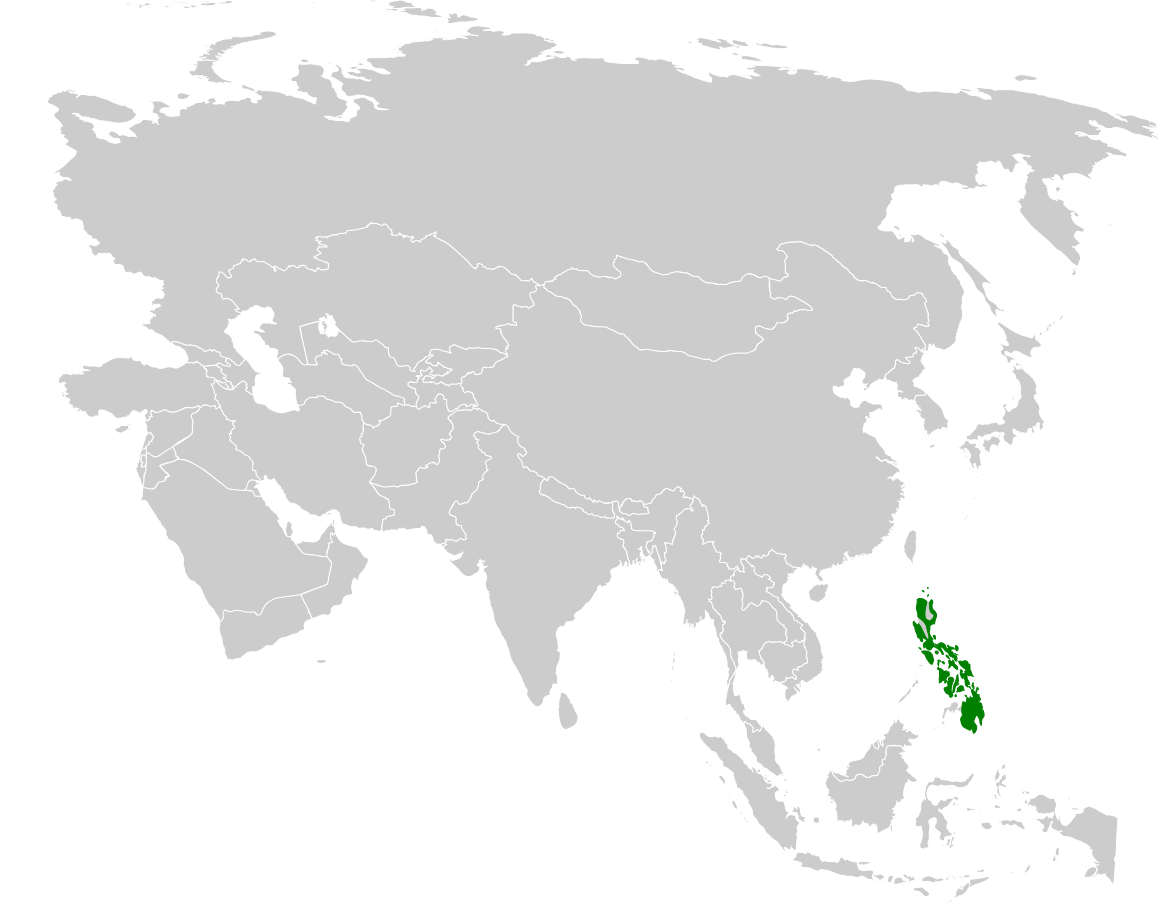

Synonyms
- Turdus philippinus Forster, 1795; Ixos philippinus (Forster, 1795)

= Philippine bulbul =

Species of bird

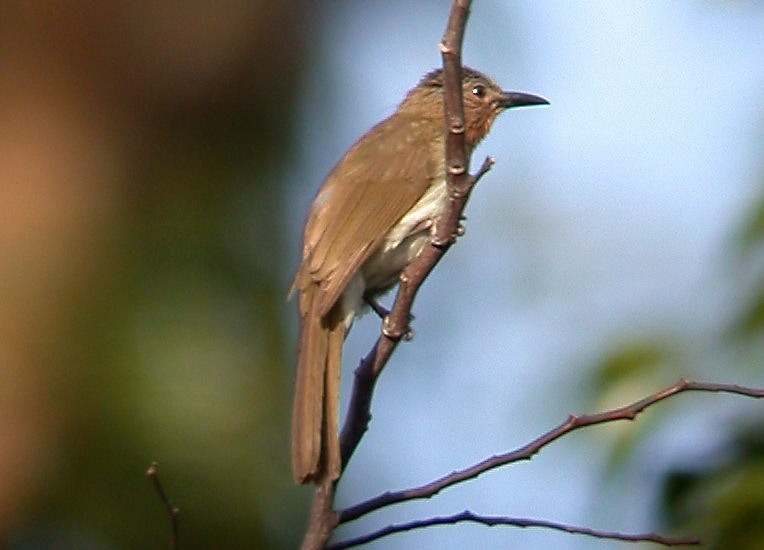
nominate subspecies

The Philippine bulbul (Hypsipetes philippinus) is a songbird species in the bulbul family, Pycnonotidae.

It is endemic to the Philippines. Its natural habitats are tropical moist lowland forest and tropical moist montane forest.

== Description and taxonomy ==
The Philippine bulbul was originally described in the genus Turdus and later placed in the genus Ixos. In 2010, it was re-classified to the genus Hypsipetes as it is very closely related to the type species of that genus, the black bulbul. Until 2010, the Mindoro bulbul, Visayan bulbul and Zamboanga bulbul were all considered as subspecies of the Philippine bulbul.

The Philippine bulbul differs from the rest with its lighter plummage, smaller bill and different call.

=== Subspecies ===
Three subspecies are currently recognized:

- Hypsipetes philippinus parkesi - (du Pont, 1980): Found on Burias
- Hypsipetes philippinus philippinus - (Forster, 1795): Found in northern Philippines
- Hypsipetes philippinus saturatior - (Hartert, 1916): Found in eastern-central and southern Philippines

== Behaviour and ecology ==
It is a generalist that feeds on fruit and insects.

Fledglings of the Philippine bulbul were recorded on Mindanao in late April, but the breeding season seems to be prolonged as females with ripe ovarian follicles were still found in April and May. Territorial songs are heard at lower altitudes as late as May, while further upslope the birds are silent at that time of year and presumably engaged in breeding activity. The besra has been recorded as a predator of young Philippine bulbuls, and this or other goshawks might also catch adult birds.

== Habitat and conservation status ==
Its natural habitat is tropical moist lowland forest, forest edge, clearings, and coconut groves up to 2,000 meters above sea level.

A common and adaptable bird as long as sufficient forest remains, it is not considered a threatened species by the IUCN.
