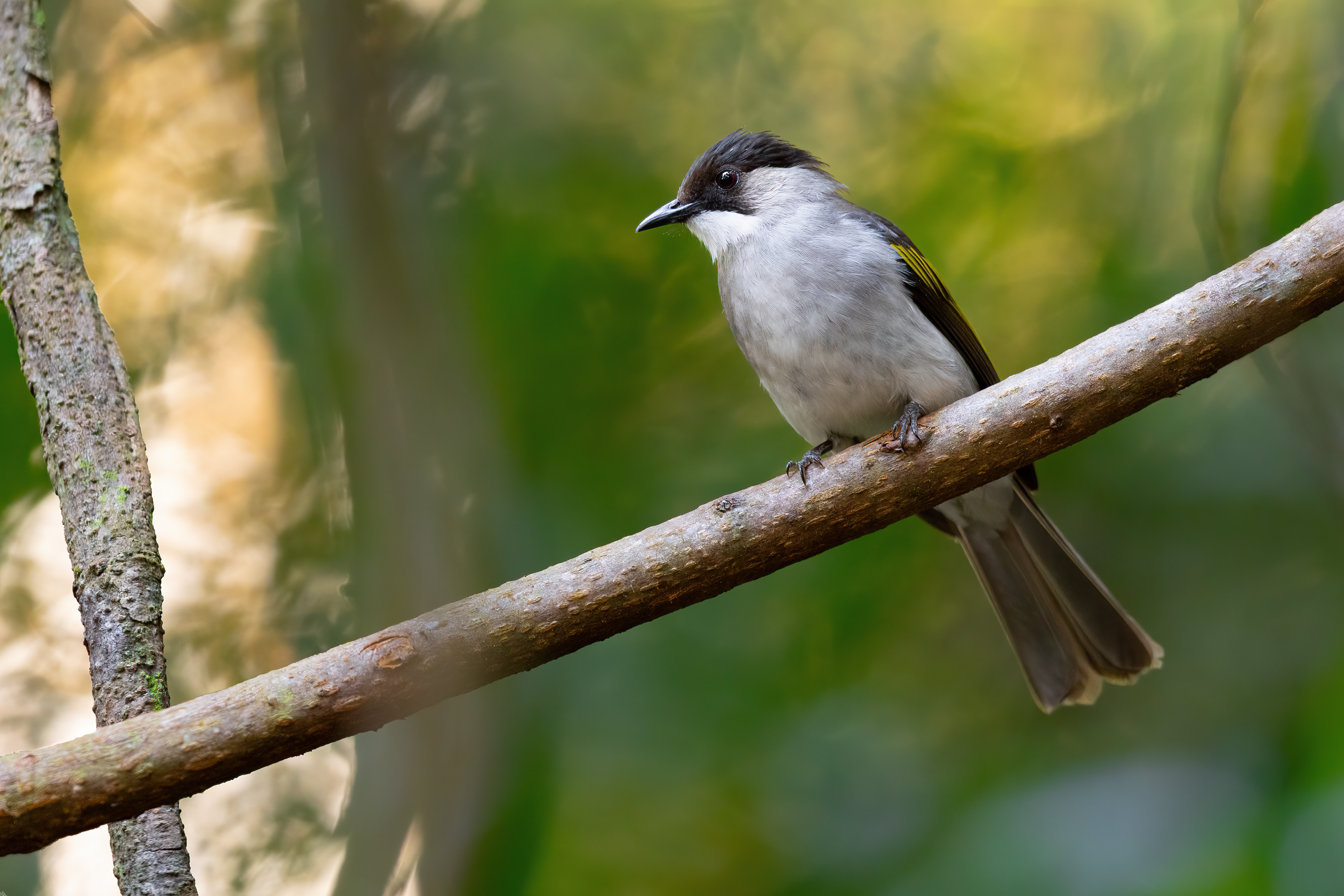

Conservation status
- Least Concern (IUCN 3.1)

Scientific classification
- Kingdom: Animalia
- Phylum: Chordata
- Class: Aves
- Order: Passeriformes
- Family: Pycnonotidae
- Genus: Hemixos
- Species: H. flavala

Binomial name
- Hemixos flavala Blyth, 1845

Synonyms
- Hypsipetes flavala; Hypsipetes flavalus; Microscelis flavala

= Ashy bulbul =

Species of songbird

The ashy bulbul (Hemixos flavala) is a species of songbird in the bulbul family, Pycnonotidae. It is found on the Indian subcontinent and in Southeast Asia. Its natural habitats are subtropical or tropical moist lowland forest and subtropical or tropical moist montane forest.

== Taxonomy and systematics ==
Formerly, some authorities classified the ashy bulbul in the genera Hypsipetes and Microscelis.

=== Subspecies ===
Five subspecies are currently recognized:

- H. f. flavala - Blyth, 1845: Found in the eastern Himalayas, north-eastern Bangladesh, north-western Myanmar and southern China
- H. f. hildebrandi - Hume, 1874: Found in eastern Myanmar and north-western Thailand
- H. f. davisoni - Hume, 1877: Found in south-eastern Myanmar and south-western Thailand
- H. f. bourdellei - Delacour, 1926: Found in southern China, eastern Thailand, northern and central Laos
- H. f. remotus - (Deignan, 1957): Found in southern Indochina

== Description ==
The ashy bulbul is a medium-sized to large species of bulbul, reaching an average length of 20–21 cm (7.9–8.3 in) and an average mass of 27.2–35.2 g (0.96–1.24 oz). It has a generally dark, greyish appearance. the upperparts are grey, as is the breast, while the remainder of the underparts are white. The top of the head is dark grey, while the lores are blackish and the ear coverts are light brown. The wings are brown with a golden-yellow patch made by the edges of the flight feathers, while the tail is dark brown. The feathers of the crown can be extended to make a crest, while the throat feathers can also be puffed up.

== Distribution and habitat ==
The ashy bulbul is a native of South and Southeast Asia. In South Asia, it is found across the Himalayas from Himachal Pradesh in India and Nepal into Myanmar and northeastern Bangladesh. In Southeast Asia, it is found from Myanmar east through southern China, Thailand, Laos, and Cambodia into Vietnam. It inhabits evergreen broadleaf forests, pine forests, and plantations in montane habitats. It is most abundant at elevations of 700–1,600 m (2,300–5,200 ft), but can be seen as high as 2,100 m (6,900 ft). It often descends to the lowlands during the winter, but rarely goes as low as sea level.

== Gallery ==
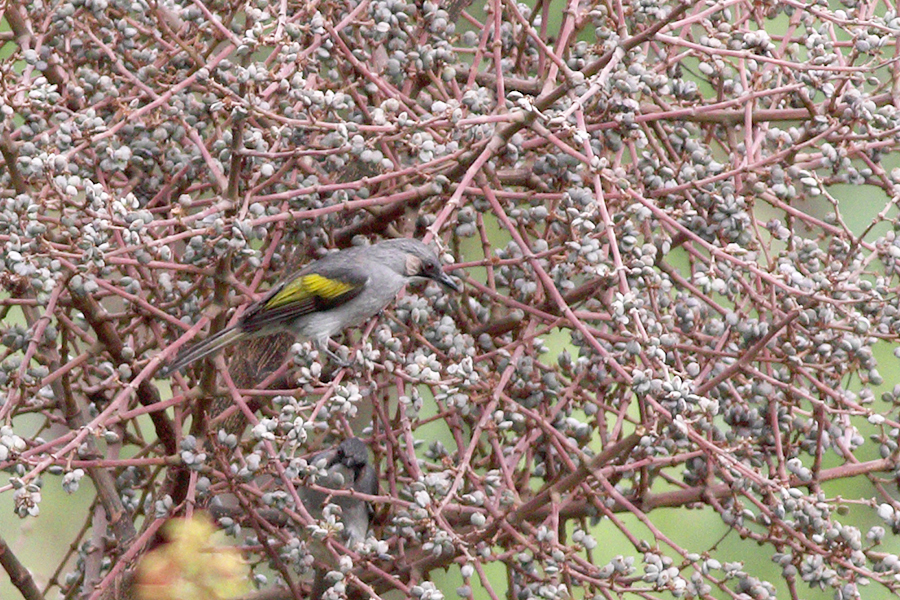
H. f. flavala from Eaglenest Wildlife Sanctuary in Arunachal Pradesh, India

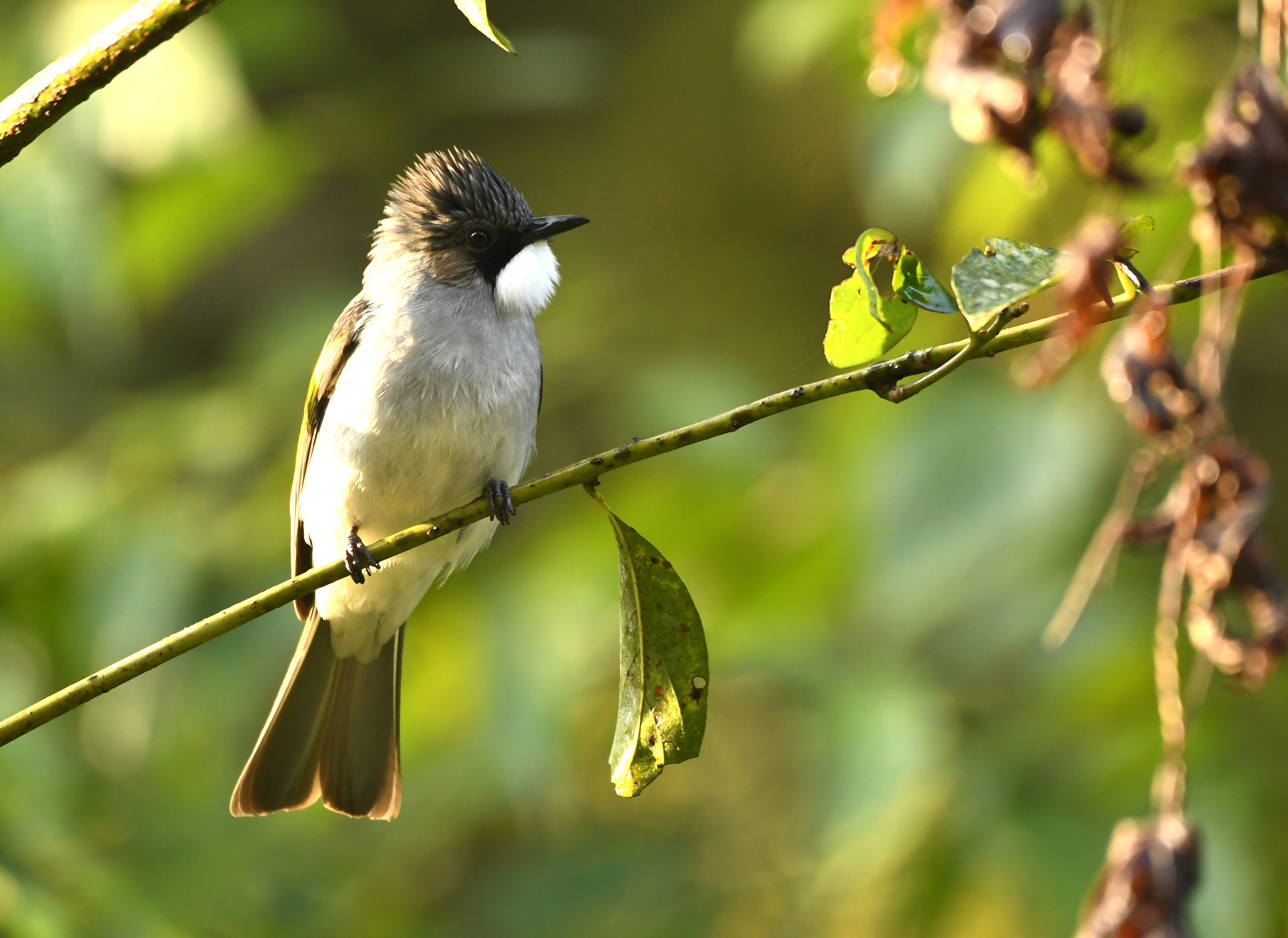
Ashy bulbul from Uttarakhand, India

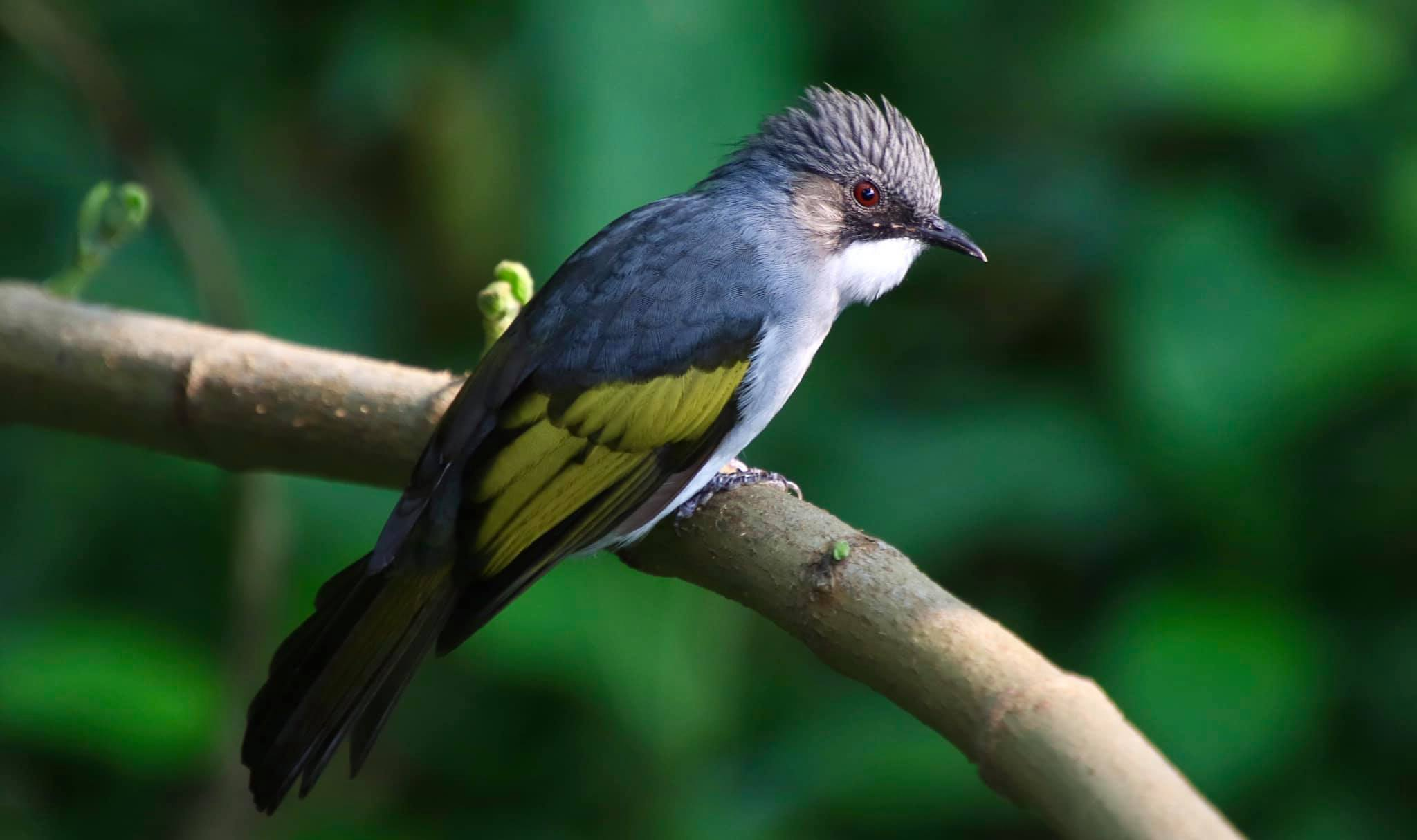
From Lamjung, Nepal

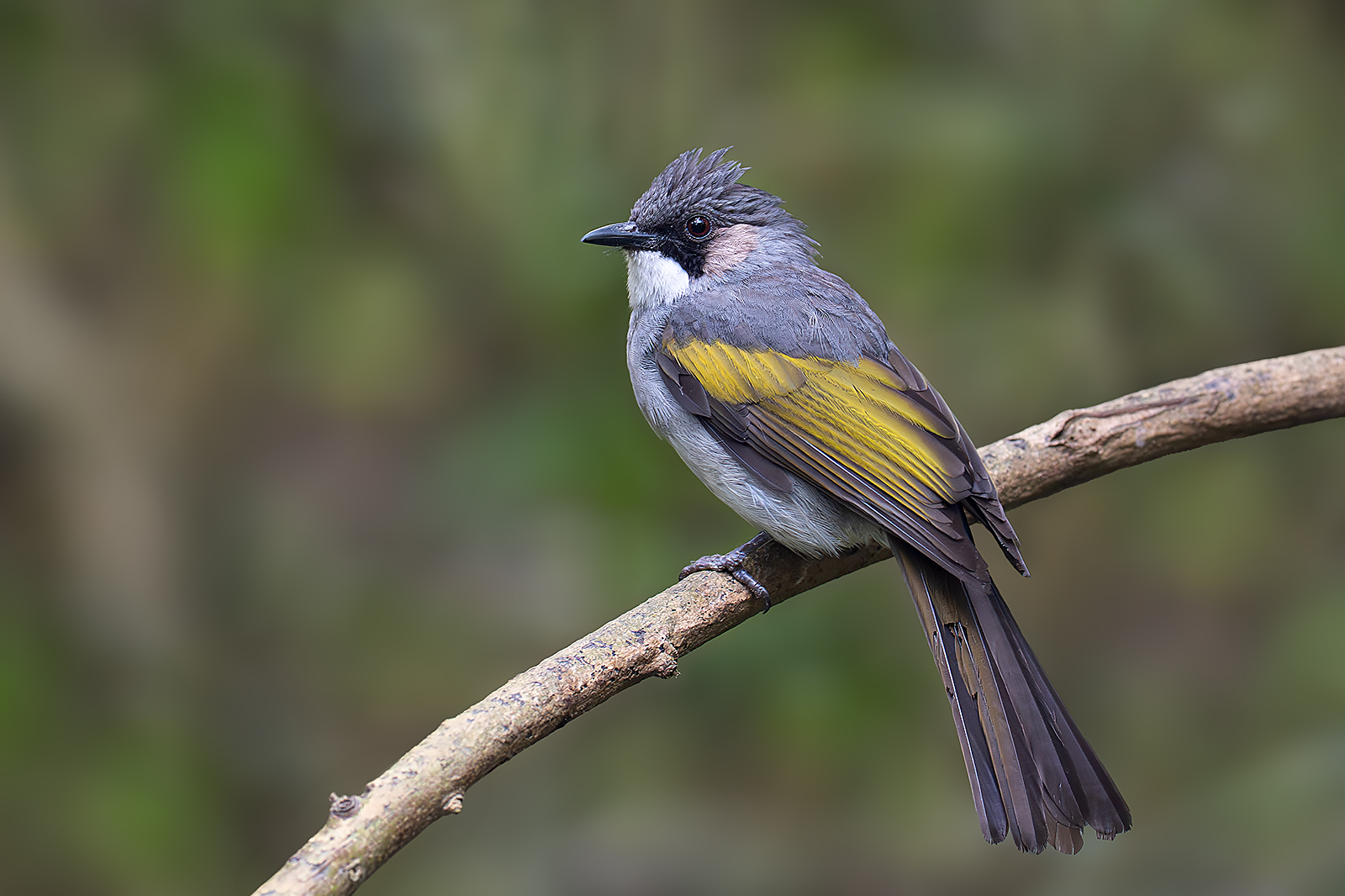
from West Bengal, India.
