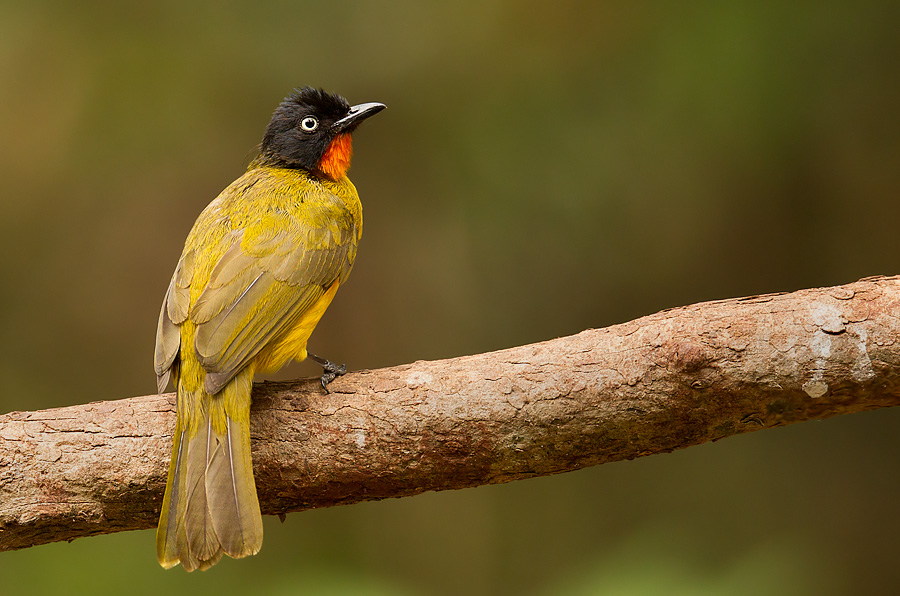
- Flame-throated bulbul at Dandeli, India

Conservation status
- Least Concern (IUCN 3.1)

Scientific classification
- Kingdom: Animalia
- Phylum: Chordata
- Class: Aves
- Order: Passeriformes
- Family: Pycnonotidae
- Genus: Rubigula
- Species: R. gularis

Binomial name
- Rubigula gularis (Gould, 1836)

Synonyms
- Brachypus gularis protonym; Pycnonotus melanicterus gularis; Brachypus rubineus Jerdon, 1839; Pycnonotus gularis

= Flame-throated bulbul =

Species of bird

The flame-throated bulbul (Rubigula gularis) is a member of the bulbul family of passerine birds and the state bird of Goa. It is found only in the forests of the Western Ghats in southern India. Formerly included as a subspecies of Pycnonotus flaviventris, it has since been elevated to the status of a full species. They are olive-backed with yellow undersides, a triangular orange-red throat and a white iris that stands out against the contrasting black head. They are usually seen foraging in groups in the forest canopy for berries and small insects. They have a call often with two or three tinkling notes that can sound similar to those produced by the red-whiskered bulbul. The species has been referred to in the past by names such as ruby-throated bulbul and black-headed bulbul, but these are ambiguous and could apply to other species such as Rubigula flaviventris and R. dispar.

== Taxonomy and systematics ==
- - - Pycnonotus erythropthalmos
    - - Pycnonotus squamatus
      - Pycnonotus cyaniventris
  - - Pycnonotus flaviventris
    - - - Pycnonotus gularis
        - Pycnonotus melanicterus
      - - Pycnonotus dispar
        - Pycnonotus montis

Near relatives of the flame-throated bulbul

The species was described by John Gould in December 1835 (but published in 1836) based on a specimen in the Zoological Society of London that had been obtained from Travancore State. Gould noted that it was very similar to Brachypus dispar (now Rubigula dispar) that had been described by Thomas Horsfield and placed the new species likewise in the genus Brachypus as B. gularis. Viscount Walden suggested that this had already been described by Jerdon as Brachypus rubineus and called the "ruby-throated bulbul" (although this name was published later). This was subsequently included as a subspecies of a larger number of similar bulbuls in the Asian region under a broadly circumscribed Pycnonotus melanicterus. With a resurgence in the application of the phylogenetic species concept, the isolated population in the Western Ghats of India was separated as the flame-throated bulbul. The crested populations in the Eastern Ghats and Himalayas that lack the red throat which were treated as subspecies flaviventris were also elevated into full species as Pycnonotus flaviventris. Pycnonotus melanicterus in this newer and narrower circumscription followed by Pamela Rasmussen in Birds of South Asia (2005) and the Handbook of the Birds of the World (2005) only included the Sri Lankan population which was referred to as the black-capped bulbul. A 2017 study noted that the Western Ghats P. gularis and Sri Lankan P. melanicterus were closely related within a clade (the age of divergence from the common ancestor of its sister clades, however, has not been estimated in the study) that includes P. montis, P. dispar, and P. flaviventris leading to a placement of these species in a new genus Rubigula.

== Description ==
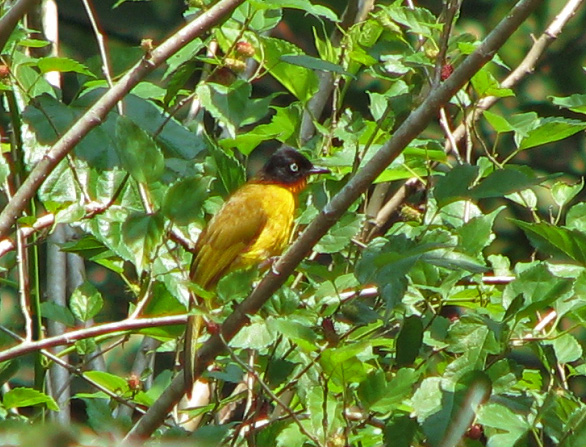
The white iris is distinctive

The flame-throated bulbul is about 18 cm long with an olive-green back and yellow underparts, a squarish black head without a crest, an orange-red throat. The iris is white and contrasts with the dark head. The legs are brown and the gape is yellowish-pink. The bill is dark brown to black. The plumage of young birds has not been described.

== Distribution and habitat ==
The flame-throated bulbul is found in the Western Ghats from southern Maharashtra and Goa southwards. It is a bird of forest that is only rarely seen at the edges of forests or inside coffee plantations.

== Behaviour and ecology ==
The flame-throated bulbul keeps in small flocks and feeds on berries, including those of Lantana sp. It inhabits evergreen forests often along streams and valleys. The flame-throated bulbul feeds on fruit and insects, sometimes in mixed species foraging flocks.

Populations appear to move seasonally within the Western Ghats.

The breeding season is mostly from February to April. The nest is a small cup, placed in undergrowth from 1 to 3 metres from the ground level and is usually made of yellowing leaves bound with cobwebs and can easily be mistaken for a wind-blown accumulation of dry leaves.
