= Rufous-bellied bulbul =

Rufous-bellied bulbul may refer to:

- Mountain bulbul, a species of bird found in Southeast Asia
- Sunda bulbul, a species of bird found on Sumatra and Java
