= Hypsipetes virescens =

Hypsipetes virescens may refer to:

- Nicobar bulbul, a species of bird found on the Nicobar Islands
- Olive bulbul, a species of bird found in Southeast Asia
- Sunda bulbul, a species of bird found on Sumatra and Java
