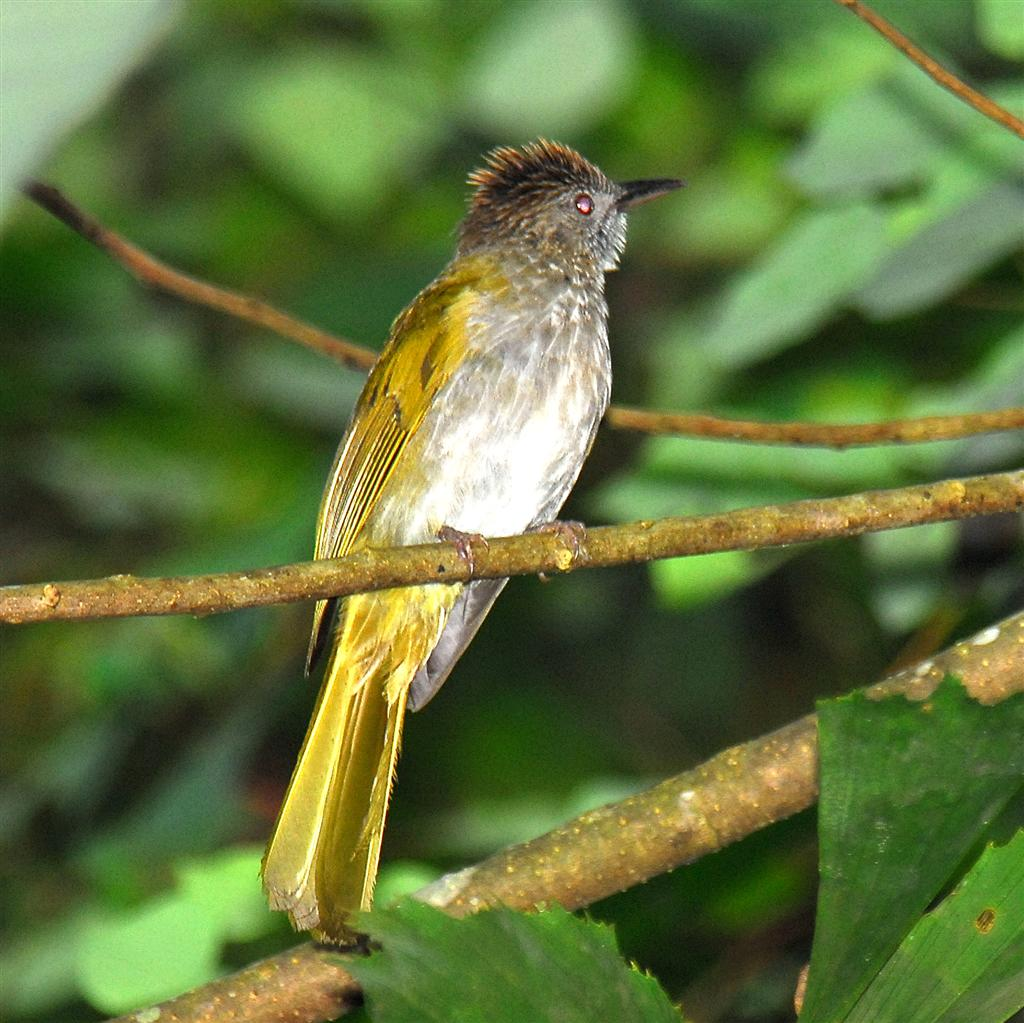
- Mountain bulbul (Ixos mcclellandii)

Scientific classification
- Kingdom: Animalia
- Phylum: Chordata
- Class: Aves
- Order: Passeriformes
- Family: Pycnonotidae
- Genus: Ixos; Temminck, 1825

Type species
- Ixos virescens (Javan bulbul) Temminck, 1825

Synonyms
- Ixus

= Ixos =

Genus of birds

Ixos is a genus of passerine birds in the bulbul family, Pycnonotidae.

== Taxonomy and systematics ==
The genus Ixos was introduced in 1825 by the Dutch zoologist Coenraad Jacob Temminck to accommodate the Javan bulbul. The genus name is the Ancient Greek for "mistletoe".

Some authorities have advocated a complete merger of the genus Ixos with Hypsipetes – and even the entire "Hypsipetes group" of bulbuls, which also includes Hemixos, Iole and Tricholestes. Being the oldest genus name, Ixos would apply to all of them, rather than Hypsipetes as is often believed. This re-classification seems hardly appropriate however, since Alophoixus and Setornis cannot be excluded from the "Hypsipetes group", and an all-out merge would turn the resultant "genus" Ixos into an ill-defined "wastebin taxon". The erroneous inclusion of I. virescens in Hypsipetes has caused the Nicobar bulbul to be listed under its invalid junior synonym H. nicobariensis rather than the valid names H. virescens or I. nicobariensis.

=== Extant species ===
There are five extant species in the genus Ixos:

Image	Scientific name	Common name	Distribution
	Cream-striped bulbul	Ixos leucogrammicus	Bukit Barisan
	Mountain bulbul	Ixos mcclellandii	Himalayas, Patkai, southern China, Hainan and northern Indochina
	Streaked bulbul	Ixos malaccensis	Malay peninsula, Sumatra and Borneo
	Javan bulbul	Ixos virescens	Java
	Sumatran bulbul	Ixos sumatranus	Sumatra

=== Former species ===
Formerly, some authorities also considered the following species (or subspecies) as species within the genus Ixos:

- Nicobar bulbul (as Ixos nicobariensis)
- Cream-striped bulbul (as Ixos leucogrammicus)
- Spot-necked bulbul (as Ixos tympanistrigus)
- Grey-headed bulbul (as Ixos Fisquetti)
- Scaly-breasted bulbul (as Ixos squamatus)
- Red-whiskered bulbul (pyrrhotis) (as Ixos pyrrhotis)
- Red-whiskered bulbul (emeria) (as Ixos emeria)
- Chinese red-whiskered bulbul (as Ixos monticola)
- Brown-breasted bulbul (andersoni) (as Ixus Andersoni)
- Light-vented bulbul (hainanus) (as Ixus hainanus)
- White-eared bulbul (as Ixos leucotis)
- Sooty-headed bulbul (germani) (as Ixus Germani)
- White-spectacled bulbul (as Ixus xanthopygos)
- Common bulbul (as Ixos inornatus)
- Dark-capped bulbul (as Ixos tricolor)
- Pale-eyed bulbul (as Ixus Davisoni)
- Yellow-throated bulbul (as Ixos xantholaemus)
- Yellow-vented bulbul (gourdini) (as Ixos gourdini)
- Spectacled bulbul (as Ixos erythropthalmos)
- Yellow-throated leaflove (as Ixus flavicollis)
- Yellow-bellied bulbul (as Ixos phaeocephalus)
- Sulphur-bellied bulbul (as Ixos palawanensis)
- Seram golden bulbul (as Ixos affinis)
- Philippine bulbul (as Ixos philippinus)
- Mindoro bulbul (as Ixos mindorensis)
- Visayan bulbul (as Ixos guimarasensis)
- Zamboanga bulbul (as Ixos rufigularis)
- Streak-breasted bulbul (as Ixos siquijorensis)
- Yellowish bulbul (as Ixos everetti)
- Brown-eared bulbul (as Ixos amaurotis)
