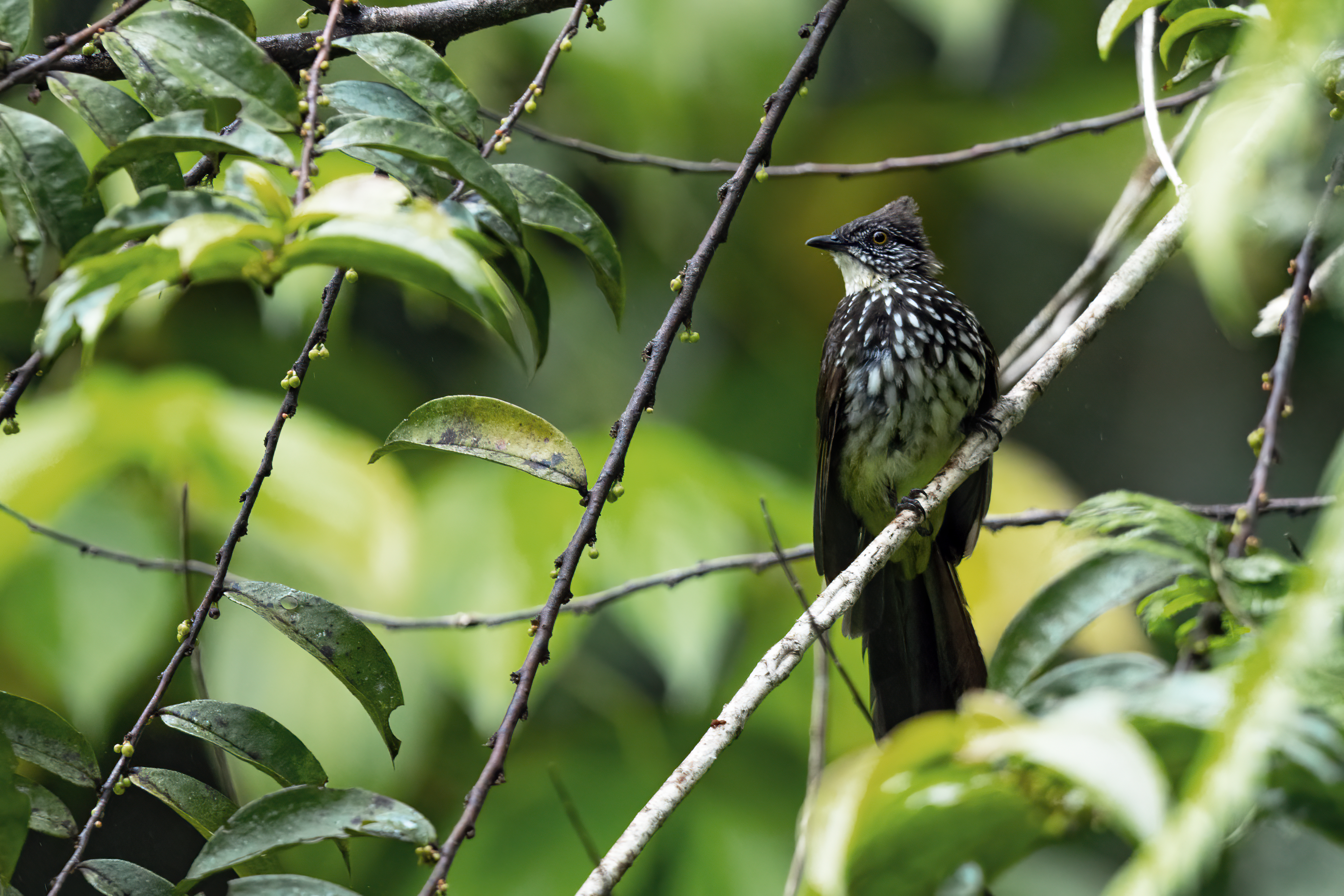

Conservation status
- Least Concern (IUCN 3.1)

Scientific classification
- Kingdom: Animalia
- Phylum: Chordata
- Class: Aves
- Order: Passeriformes
- Family: Pycnonotidae
- Genus: Ixos
- Species: I. leucogrammicus

Binomial name
- Ixos leucogrammicus Müller, S, 1836
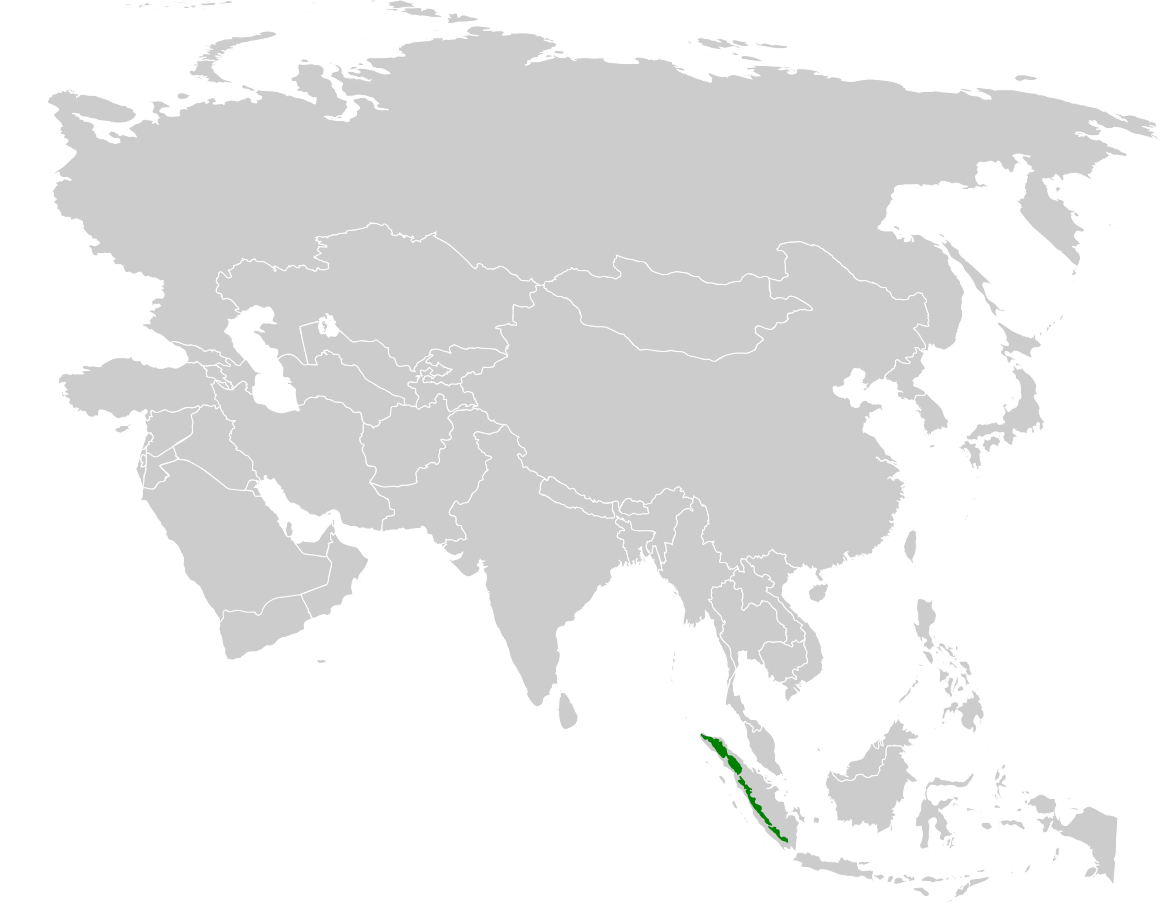

Synonyms
- Pycnonotus leucogrammicus; Hemixos leucogrammicus

= Cream-striped bulbul =

Species of songbird

The cream-striped bulbul (Ixos leucogrammicus) is a species of songbird in the bulbul family, Pycnonotidae. It is endemic to western Sumatra (Indonesia).

The cream-striped bulbul was originally described in the genus Ixos and later moved to Pycnonotus, but recent phylogenetic analysis found it as sister to the three Hemixos species, leading to a genus reassignment. Alternate names for the cream-striped bulbul include the streaked bulbul (not to be confused with Ixos malaccensis), striated bulbul or striated green bulbul (each not to be confused with Pycnonotus striatus) and Sumatran bulbul.

Its natural habitats are subtropical or tropical moist lowland forests and subtropical or tropical moist montane forests.
