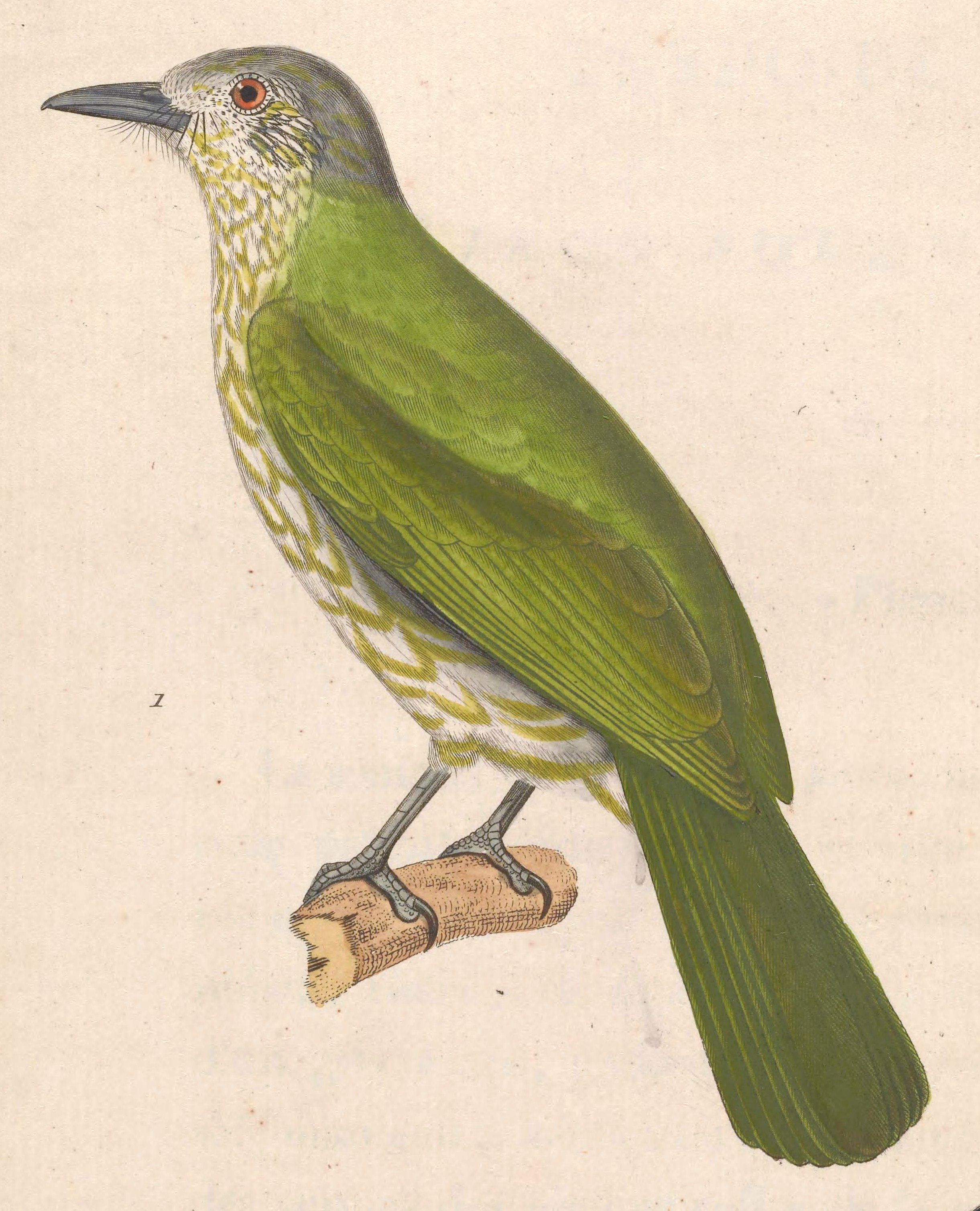
- Illustration by Nicholas Huet and Jean-Gabriel Prêtre
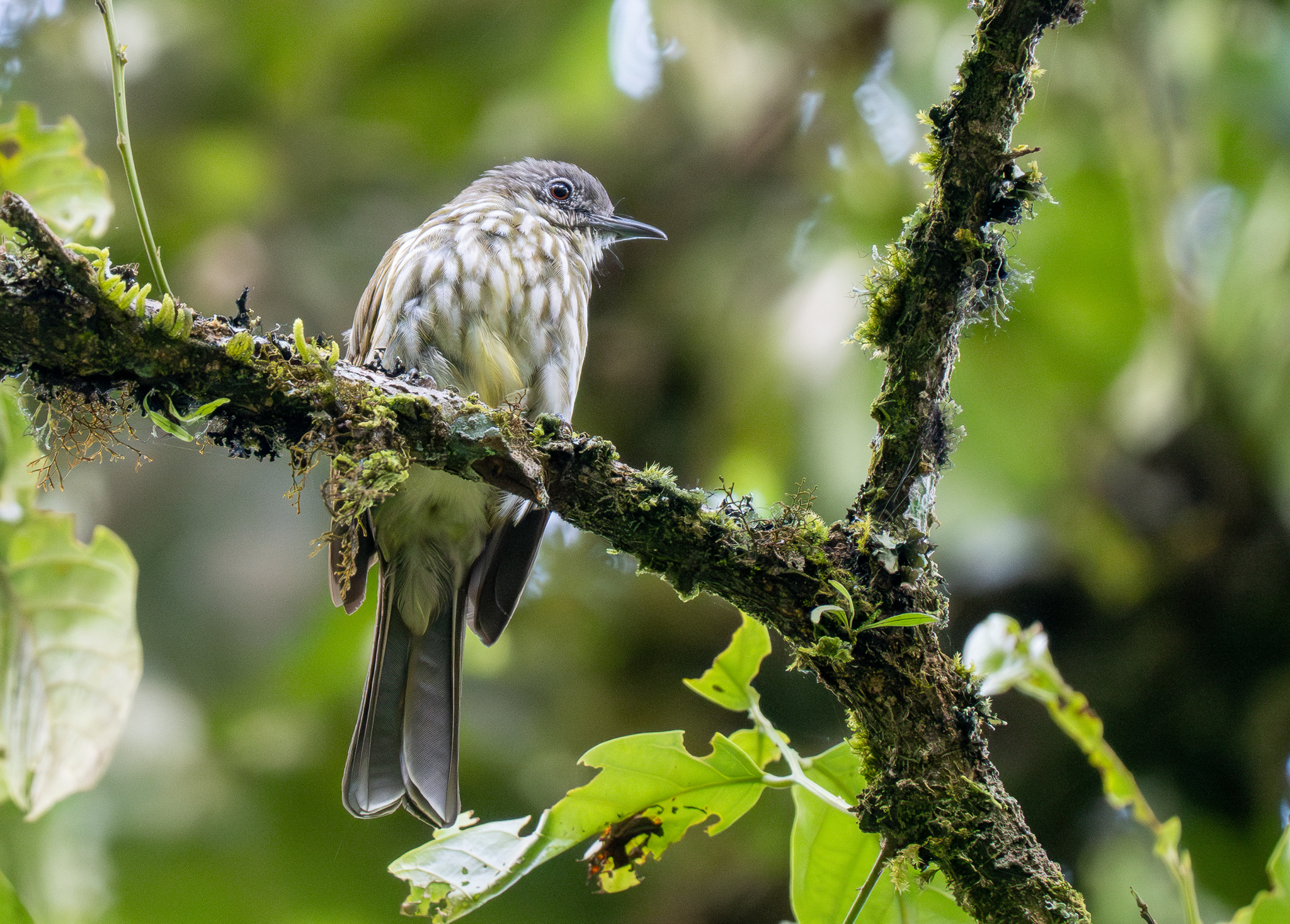

Conservation status
- Least Concern (IUCN 3.1)

Scientific classification
- Kingdom: Animalia
- Phylum: Chordata
- Class: Aves
- Order: Passeriformes
- Family: Pycnonotidae
- Genus: Ixos
- Species: I. virescens

Binomial name
- Ixos virescens Temminck, 1825

Synonyms
- Hypsipetes virescens (Temminck, 1825) (but see text)

= Javan bulbul =

Species of bird

The Javan bulbul (Ixos virescens) is a songbird species in the bulbul family. It is the type species of the genus Ixos. It is endemic to the island of Java in Indonesia in its natural habitat of subtropical or tropical moist montane forests. It is not considered a threatened species by the IUCN.

== Taxonomy and systematics ==
The Javan bulbul is sometimes classified in the genus Hypsipetes, presumably based on an earlier error in the Sibley taxonomy. The specific epithet virescens was given to the present species by Coenraad Jacob Temminck in 1825 and pre-dates the same name as given to the Nicobar bulbul by Edward Blyth in 1845. The olive bulbul has also been given the same scientific binomial, Hypsipetes virescens. Alternate names for the Javan bulbul include the green mountain bulbul, green-backed bulbul, green-winged bulbul, rufous-bellied bulbul, streaked bulbul and streaked mountain bulbul. The name 'streaked bulbul' should not be confused with the species of the same name, Ixos malaccensis.

=== Subspecies ===
One subspecies is currently recognized:

- Javan bulbul (I. v. virescens) - Temminck, 1825: Also named the Javan streaked bulbul. Found on Java

The Sumatran bulbul (I. sumatranus) of Sumatra was formerly considered a subspecies (with both species being grouped as the Sunda bulbul), but more recent studies have found it to be a distinct species.
