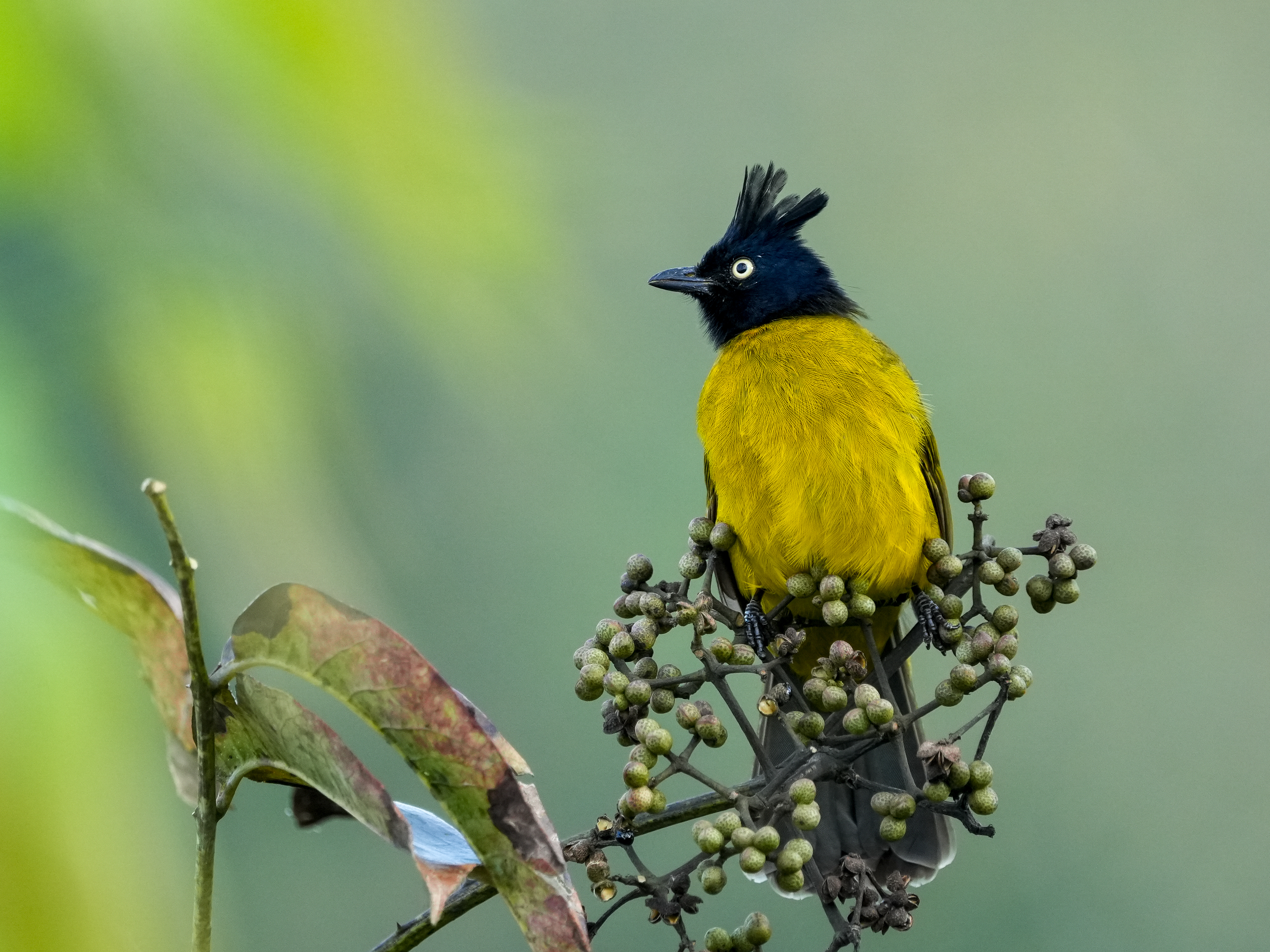
- Nominate Rubigula flaviventris flaviventris, at Meghalaya, India

Conservation status
- Least Concern (IUCN 3.1)

Scientific classification
- Kingdom: Animalia
- Phylum: Chordata
- Class: Aves
- Order: Passeriformes
- Family: Pycnonotidae
- Genus: Rubigula
- Species: R. flaviventris

Binomial name
- Rubigula flaviventris (Tickell, 1833)

Synonyms
- Vanga flaviventris; Pycnonotus flaviventris

= Black-crested bulbul =

Species of bird

The black-crested bulbul (Rubigula flaviventris) is a member of the bulbul family of passerine birds. It is found from the Indian subcontinent to southeast Asia.

== Taxonomy and systematics ==
The black-crested bulbul was originally described in the genus Vanga and later moved to the genus Pycnonotus. Pycnonotus was found to be polyphyletic in recent molecular phylogenetic studies and five bulbuls, including the black-crested bulbul, were moved to Rubigula.

Until 2008, the black-crested bulbul was considered as conspecific with the black-capped, ruby-throated, flame-throated and Bornean bulbuls, but these are all now treated as distinct.

=== Subspecies ===
Eight subspecies are accepted:

- R. f. flaviventris – (Tickell, 1833): Found from Nepal, northern and eastern India (including Pachmarhi in central India) to southern China and central Myanmar
- R. f. vantynei – Deignan, 1948: Found from eastern and southern Myanmar to southern China and northern Indochina
- R. f. xanthops – Deignan, 1948: Found in south-eastern Myanmar and western Thailand
- R. f. auratus – Deignan, 1948: Found in north-eastern Thailand and western Laos
- R. f. johnsoni – (Gyldenstolpe, 1913): Originally described as a separate species. Found in central and eastern Thailand, southern Indochina
- R. f. elbeli – Deignan, 1954: Found on islands off eastern coast of Thailand
- R. f. negata – Deignan, 1954: Found in southern Myanmar and south-western Thailand
- R. f. caecilii – Deignan, 1948: Found on the northern Malay Peninsula
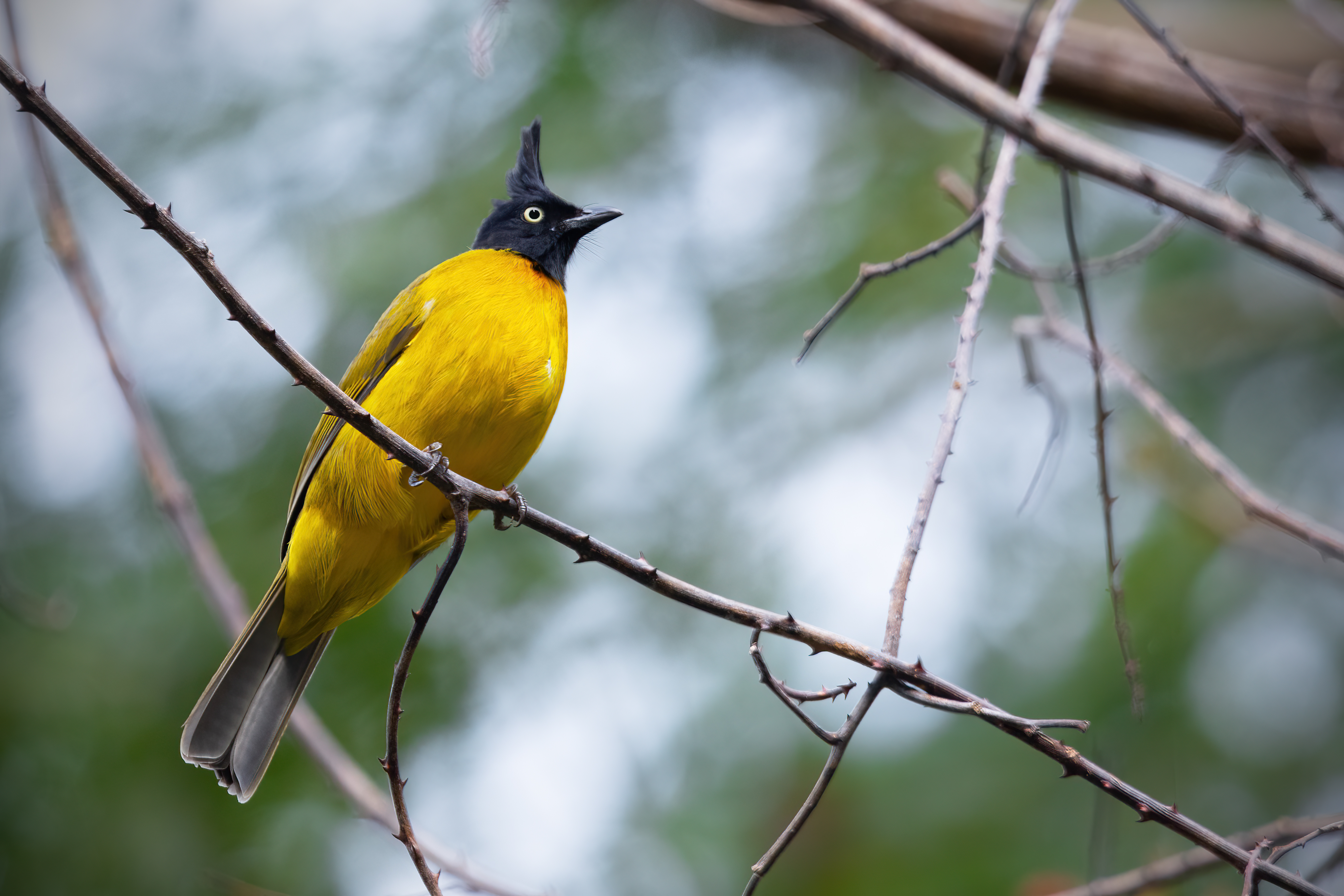
R. f. vantynei, Deo Nui San, Vietnam

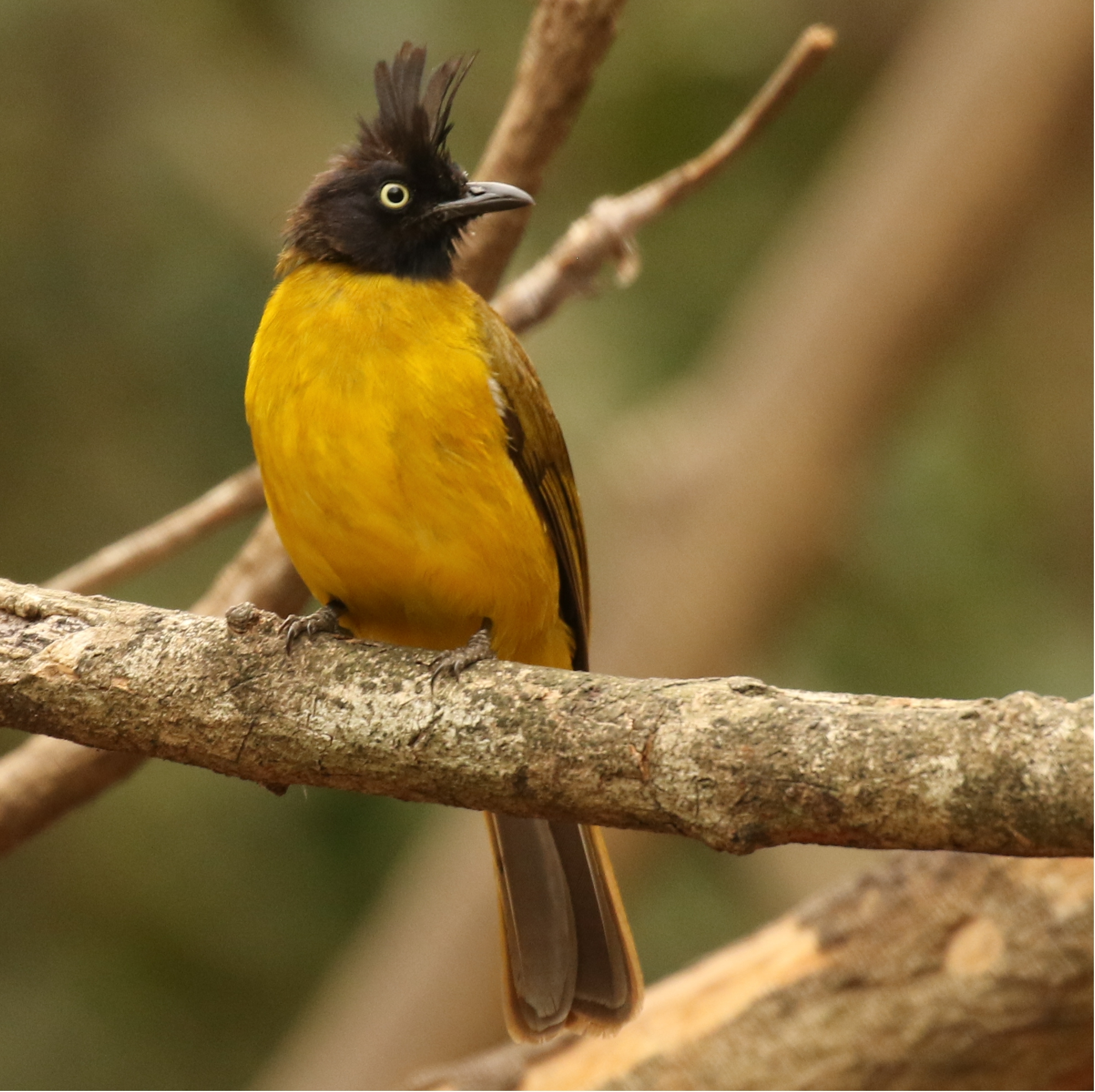
R. f. negata, Kaeng Krachan National Park, peninsular Thailand

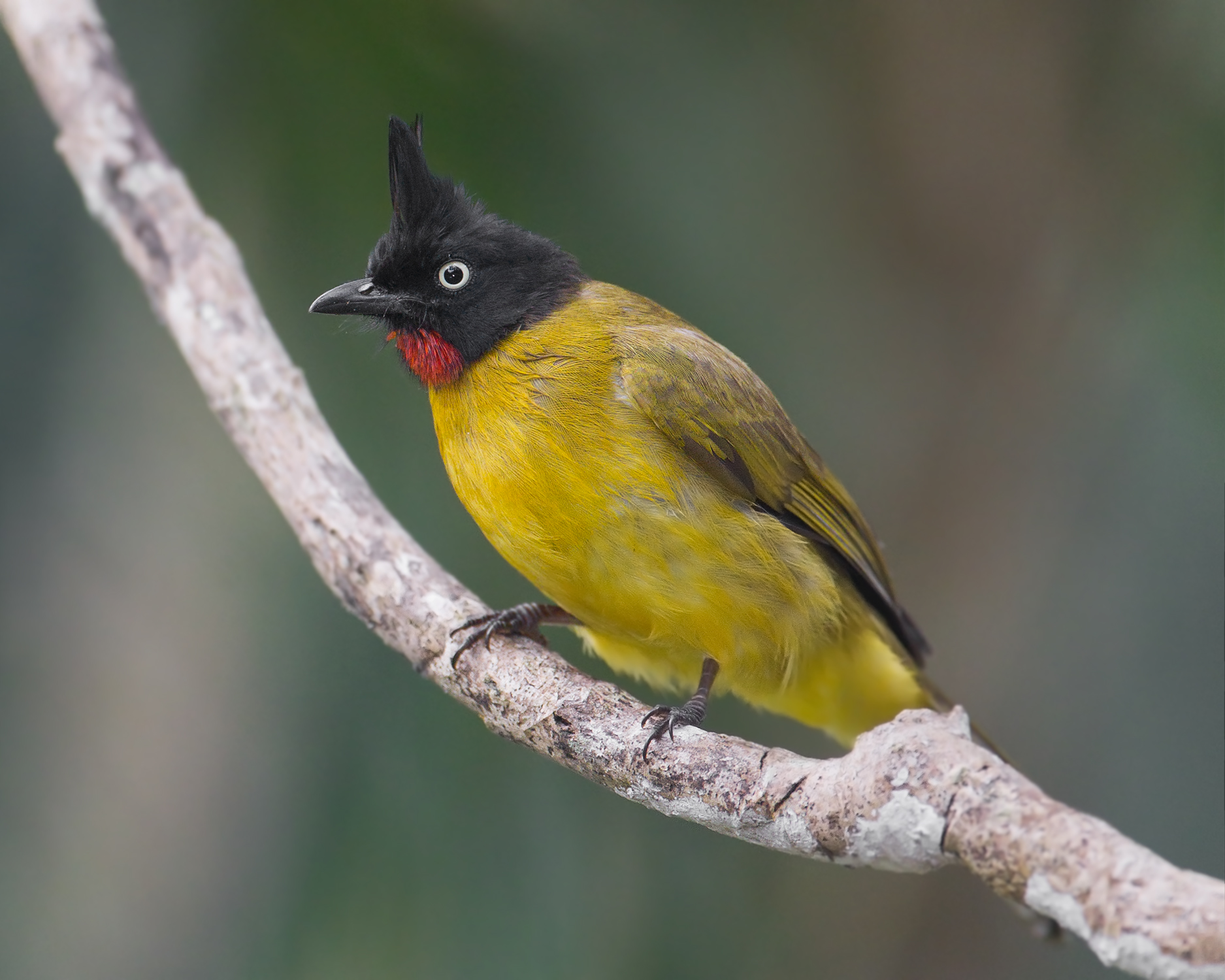
R. f. johnsoni, Khao Yai, east-central Thailand. Note the red throat in this subspecies.

== Description ==
The black-crested bulbul is 18.5–19.5 cm in length. The head is black with a distinct crest and a yellow iris, while the rest of its body is greenish yellow above and yellow below, and a greenish-black tail. The bill and the feet are black. In the subspecies R. f. johnsoni, the throat is red. Both the male and female are similar in plumage; young birds are slightly duller.

== Distribution and habitat ==
This is a bird of forest and dense scrub.

== Behaviour and ecology ==
It builds its nest in a bush; two to four eggs are a typical clutch. The black-crested bulbul feeds on fruit and insects.
