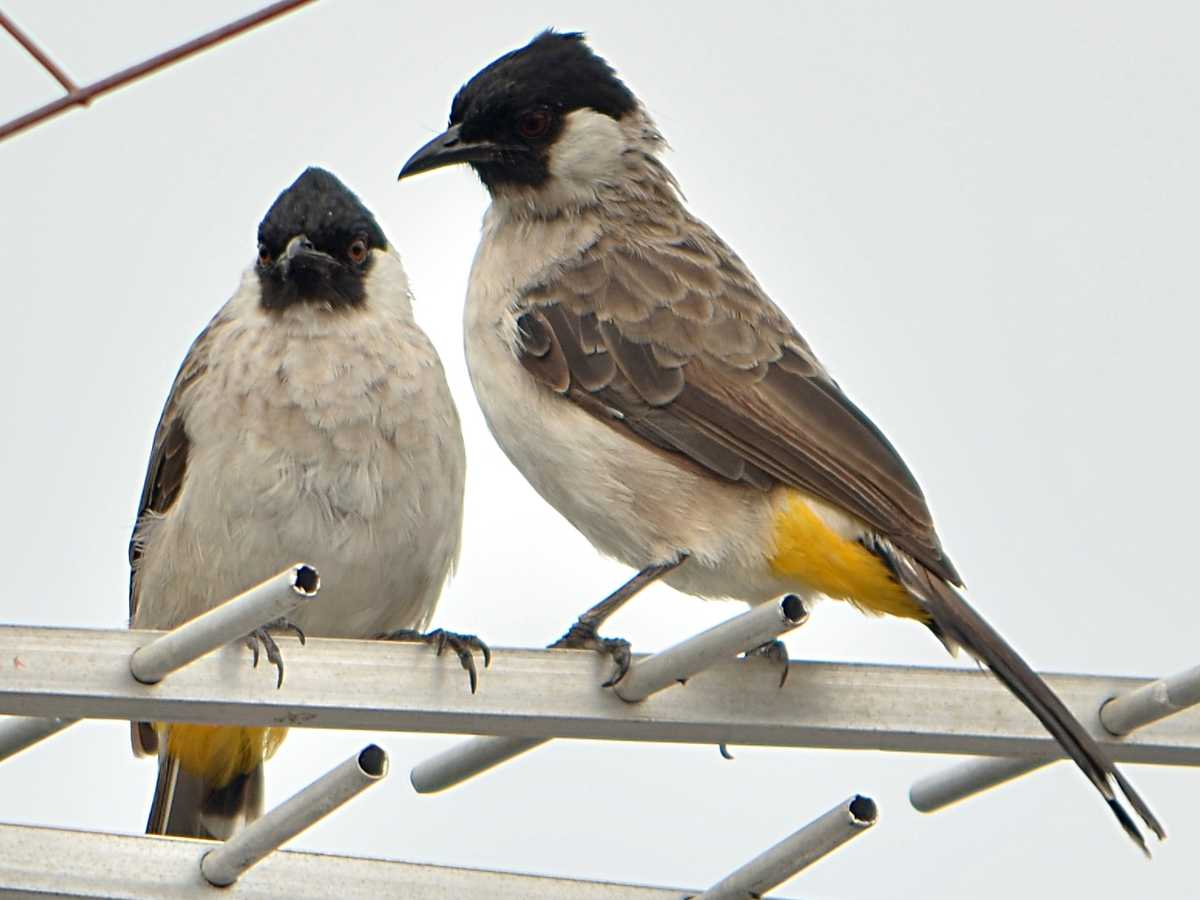

Conservation status
- Least Concern (IUCN 3.1)

Scientific classification
- Kingdom: Animalia
- Phylum: Chordata
- Class: Aves
- Order: Passeriformes
- Family: Pycnonotidae
- Genus: Pycnonotus
- Species: P. aurigaster

Binomial name
- Pycnonotus aurigaster (Vieillot, 1818)

Synonyms
- Turdus aurigaster

= Sooty-headed bulbul =

Species of songbird

The sooty-headed bulbul (Pycnonotus aurigaster) is a species of songbird in the Bulbul family, Pycnonotidae. It is found in south-eastern Asia. Its natural habitat is subtropical or tropical moist lowland forests.

== Description ==
A medium-sized songbird measuring between 18 and 21 centimetres in length with a short crest, the sooty-headed bulbul can be distinguished from the similar red-vented bulbul by its tan front, less extensive area of black on its head and gold-colored vent in certain subspecies. Its call is a series of whistled notes similar in tone to that of the red-whiskered bulbul, but delivered in a more hurried manner.

== Taxonomy and systematics ==
The sooty-headed bulbul was originally described in the genus Turdus. Alternate names for the sooty-headed bulbul include the golden-vented bulbul and several names used for other species (black-capped, red-vented, white-eared and yellow-vented bulbul).

=== Subspecies ===
Nine subspecies are recognized:

- P. a. chrysorrhoides - (Lafresnaye, 1845): Originally described as a separate species. Found in south-eastern China
- P. a. resurrectus - Deignan, 1952: Found in southern China and north-eastern Vietnam
- P. a. dolichurus - Deignan, 1949: Found in central Vietnam
- P. a. latouchei - Deignan, 1949: Found from eastern Myanmar to southern China and northern Indochina
- P. a. klossi - (Gyldenstolpe, 1920): Found in south-eastern Myanmar and northern Thailand
- P. a. schauenseei - Delacour, 1943: Found in south-eastern Myanmar and northern Thailand
- P. a. thais - (Kloss, 1924): Found in central and southern Thailand, central Laos
- P. a. germani - (Oustalet, 1878): Originally described as a separate species in the genus Ixos. Found in eastern Thailand and southern Indochina
- P. a. aurigaster - (Vieillot, 1818): Found in Java and Bali

== Behavior and ecology ==
In Hong Kong, the sooty-headed bulbul, whilst not a rarity, is markedly less common than the red-whiskered and light-vented bulbuls. Unlike these two species, it appears to prefer dryland agricultural areas above other habitats, but can also be found in fire-damaged and degraded hill shrubland.

== Distribution and habitat ==
The sooty-headed bulbul can be found in Vietnam, Cambodia, Thailand, Burma, southern China, Hong Kong, Macao, Malaysia, Singapore and Indonesia. In China, the species is mainly limited to the south of the country, corresponding to the extent of the palaeotropical ecoregion, but the species has been recorded as far north as Shanghai in the east and Chengdu in the west. The bird has a disjunct distribution broken into two subpopulations by the Malay Peninsula, where it does not seem to occur between Prachuap Khiri Khan province in Thailand in the north, and Kuala Lumpur in Malaysia in the south.

== Gallery ==
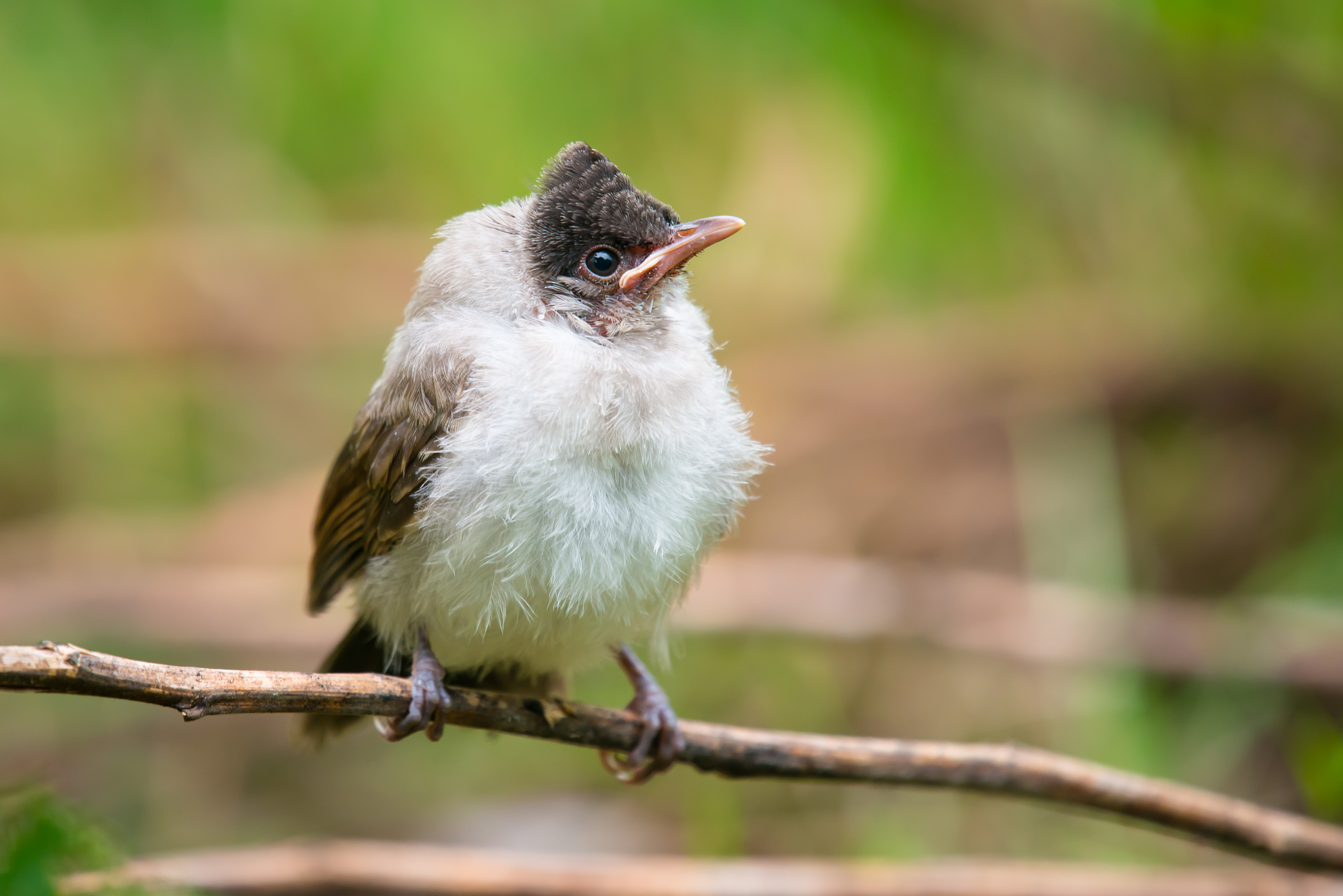
Juvenile of Sooty-headed Bulbul

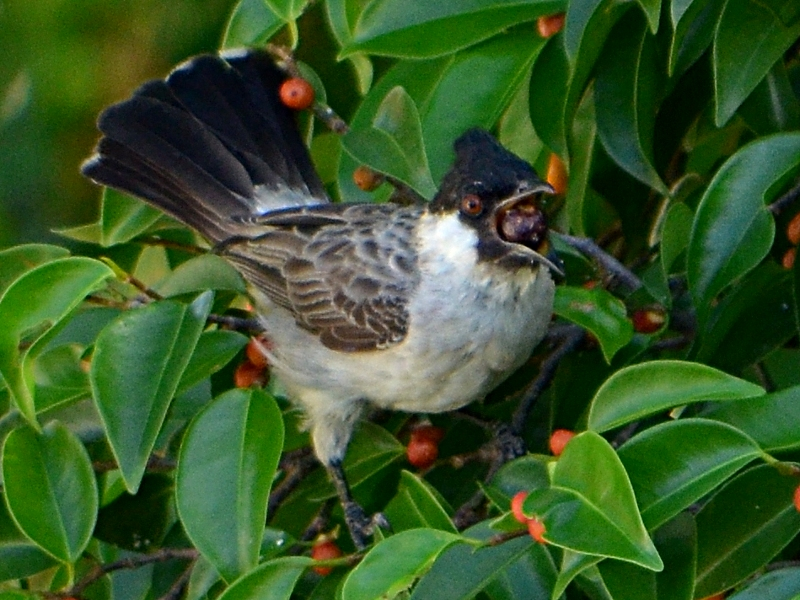
Feeding

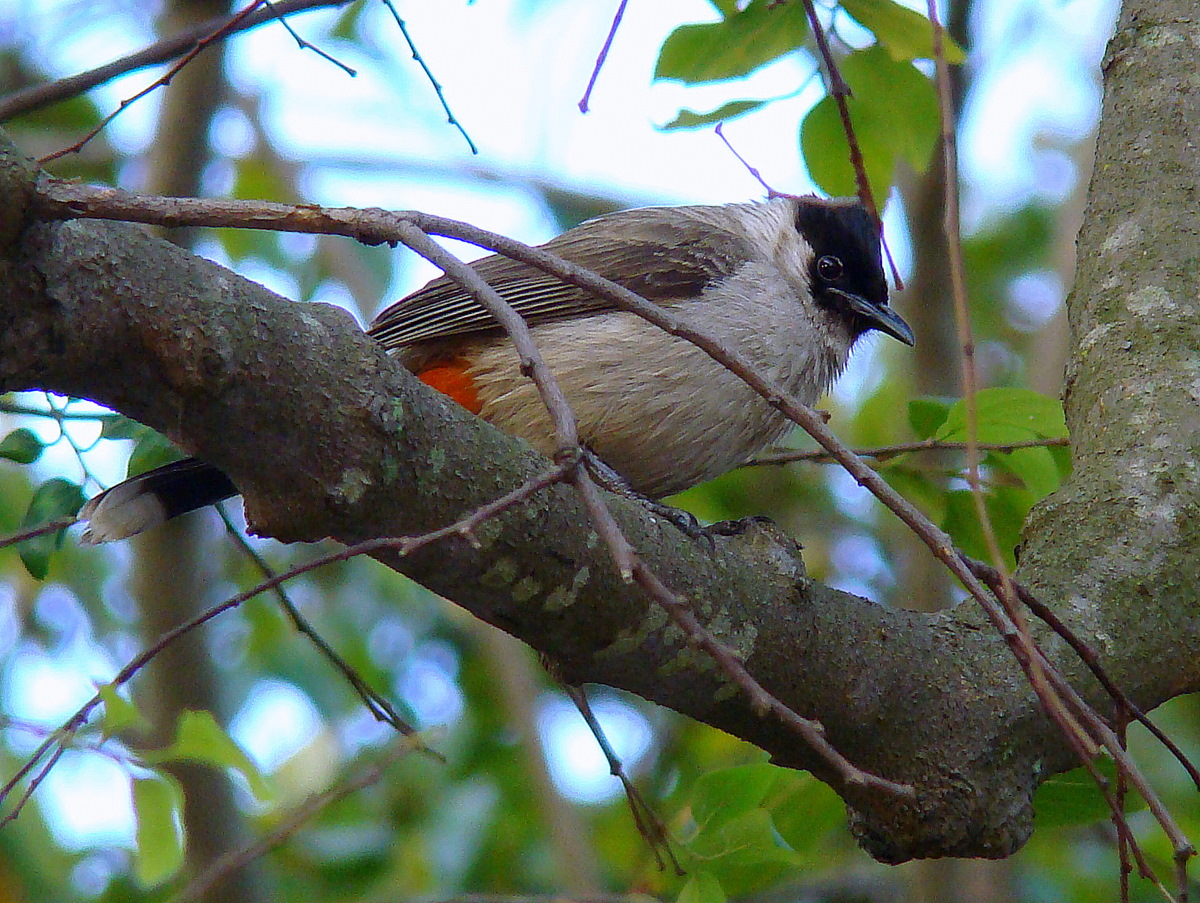
Pycnonotus aurigaster chrysorrhoides

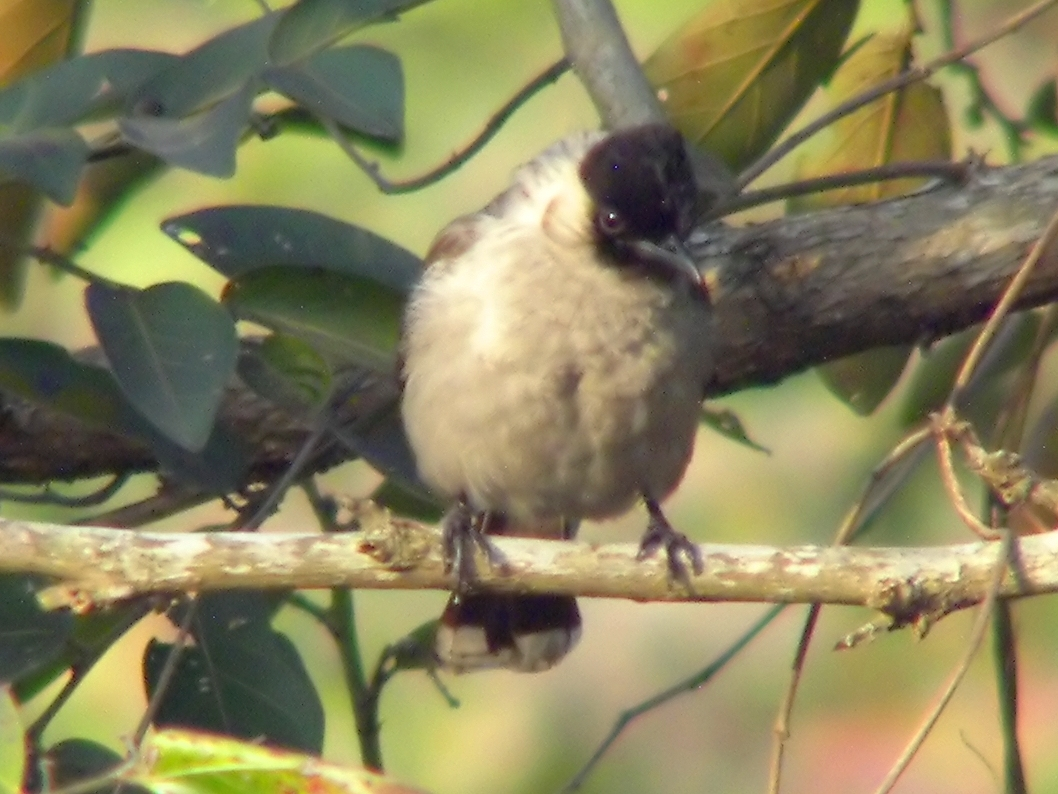
Pycnonotus aurigaster
