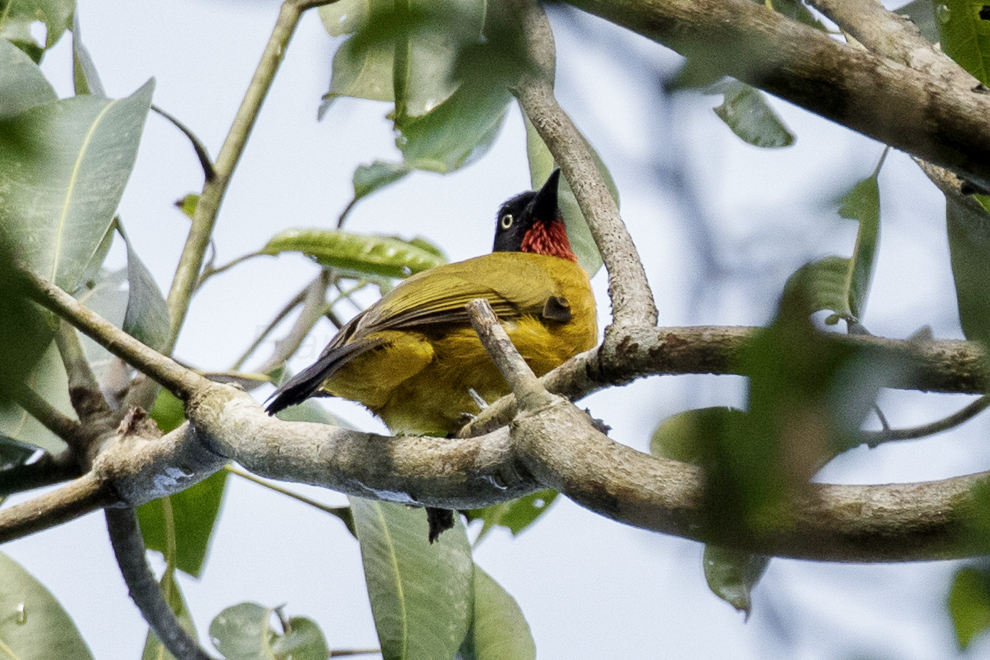
- East Java, Indonesia

Conservation status
- Vulnerable (IUCN 3.1)

Scientific classification
- Kingdom: Animalia
- Phylum: Chordata
- Class: Aves
- Order: Passeriformes
- Family: Pycnonotidae
- Genus: Rubigula
- Species: R. dispar

Binomial name
- Rubigula dispar (Horsfield, 1821)

Synonyms
- Pycnonotus melanicterus dispar; Turdus dispar; Pycnonotus dispar

= Ruby-throated bulbul =

Species of bird

The ruby-throated bulbul (Rubigula dispar), or yellow bulbul, is a member of the bulbul family of passerine birds. It was formerly considered conspecific with other Rubigula bulbuls, such as the flame-throated bulbul. It is found on Sumatra, Java, and Bali.

== Taxonomy and systematics ==
The ruby-throated bulbul was originally described in the genus Turdus and later moved to genus Pycnonotus. Pycnonotus was found to be polyphyletic in recent molecular phylogenetic studies and five bulbul species, including the ruby-throated bulbul, moved to Rubigula. Until 2008, the ruby-throated bulbul was considered as conspecific with the black-capped, black-crested, flame-throated and Bornean bulbuls, but these are all now treated as distinct.

There are two subspecies:

- Rubigula dispar dispar. Iris yellow. Java, Bali.
- Rubigula dispar matamerah. Iris red. Sumatra.

== Description ==
It is 17–20 cm long, virtually crestless, has a black head with a deep red throat, greenish-yellow back and wings, yellow underparts, and a greenish-black tail. The bill and legs are black.

== Distribution and habitat ==
This is a bird of forest and dense scrub.

== Behaviour and ecology ==
It builds its nest in a bush, with a typical clutch size of two to four eggs. The ruby-throated bulbul feeds on fruit and insects.
