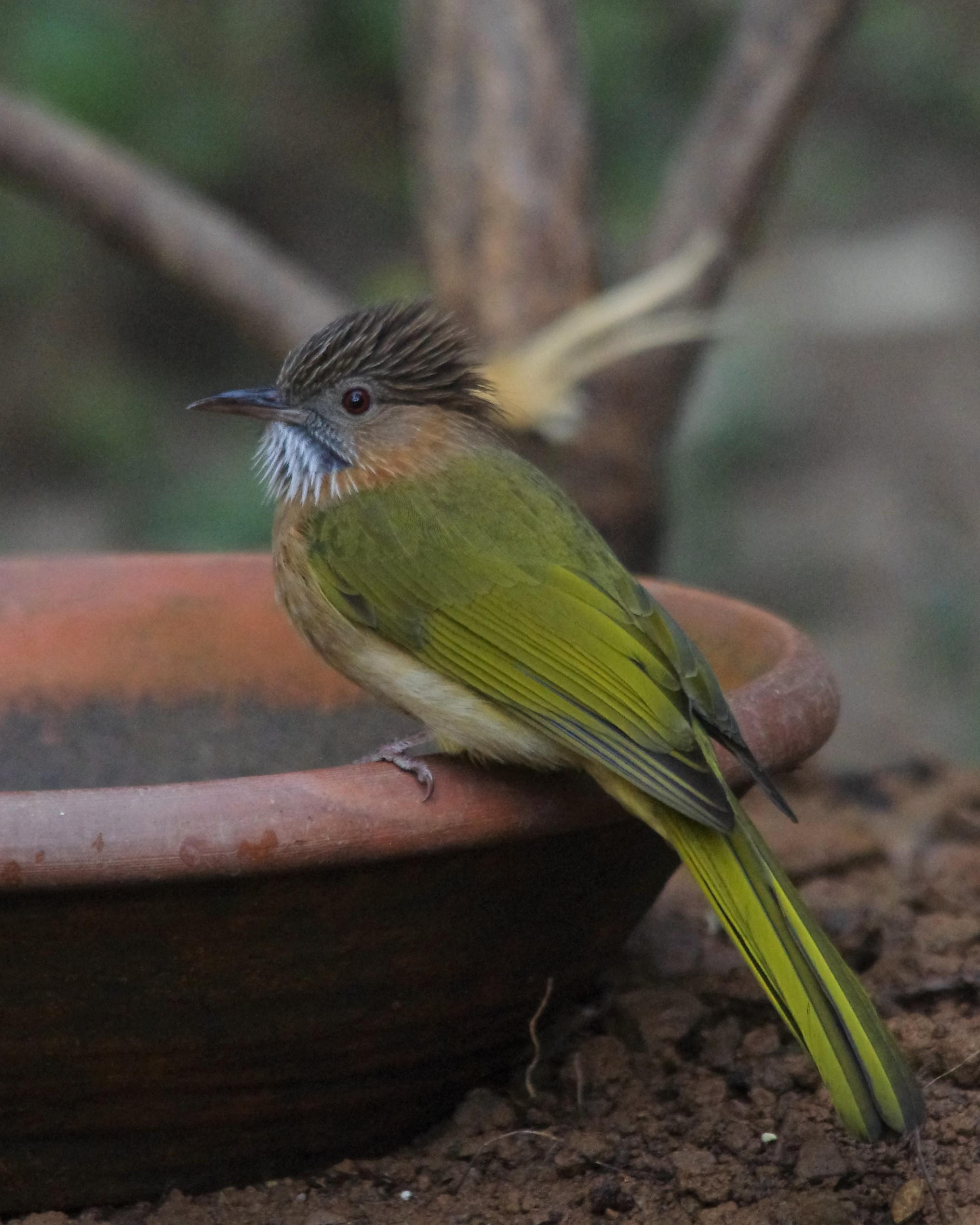
- At Sattal, Uttarakhand, India

Conservation status
- Least Concern (IUCN 3.1)

Scientific classification
- Kingdom: Animalia
- Phylum: Chordata
- Class: Aves
- Order: Passeriformes
- Family: Pycnonotidae
- Genus: Ixos
- Species: I. mcclellandii

Binomial name
- Ixos mcclellandii (Horsfield, 1840)

Synonyms
- Hypsipetes mcclellandi; Hypsipetes mcclellandii (Horsfield, 1840)

= Mountain bulbul =

Species of bird

The mountain bulbul (Ixos mcclellandii) is a songbird species in the bulbul family, Pycnonotidae. It is often placed in Hypsipetes, but seems to be closer to the type species of the genus Ixos, the Sunda bulbul. It is found in Southeast Asia and is not considered a threatened species by the IUCN. It is named after British East India Company Surgeon John McClelland.

== Taxonomy and systematics ==
The mountain bulbul was originally described in the genus Hypsipetes in 1840 by Thomas Horsfield. Alternate names for the mountain bulbul include the green-winged bulbul, McClelland's bulbul, McClelland's rufous-bellied bulbul, mountain streaked bulbul, and rufous-bellied bulbul. The common name, 'mountain bulbul', is also used as an alternate name for the Cameroon greenbul.

=== Subspecies ===
Nine subspecies are currently recognized:

- I. m. mcclellandii – (Horsfield, 1840): Found from the eastern Himalayas to north-western Myanmar
- I. m. ventralis – Stresemann & Heinrich, 1940: Found in south-western Myanmar
- I. m. tickelli – (Blyth, 1855): Originally described as a separate species in the genus Hypsipetes. Found in eastern Myanmar and north-western Thailand
- I. m. similis – (Rothschild, 1921): Found from north-eastern Myanmar to southern China and northern Indochina
- I. m. holtii – (R. Swinhoe, 1861): Originally described as a separate species in the genus Hypsipetes. Found in south-eastern China
- I. m. loquax – Deignan, 1940: Found in north-central and north-eastern Thailand, southern Laos
- I. m. griseiventer – (Robinson & Kloss, 1919): Found in southern Vietnam
- I. m. canescens – Riley, 1933: Originally described as a separate species. Found in eastern Thailand and south-western Cambodia
- I. m. peracensis – (Hartert & Butler, AL, 1898): Found on the Malay Peninsula

== Distribution and habitat ==
It is found from the Indian subcontinent and southern China through Indochina to the Malay Peninsula. Its natural habitat is broadleaved evergreen forests between 800m and 2590m ASL.

== Gallery ==
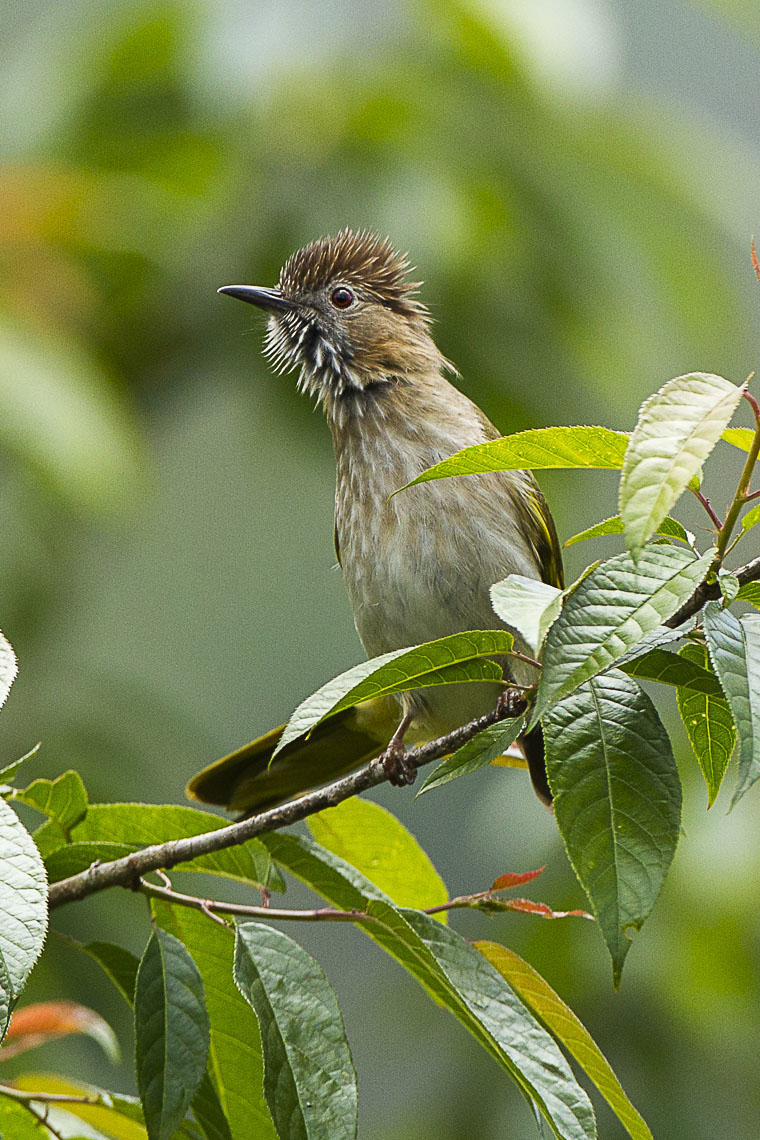
Mountain bulbul in Thailand

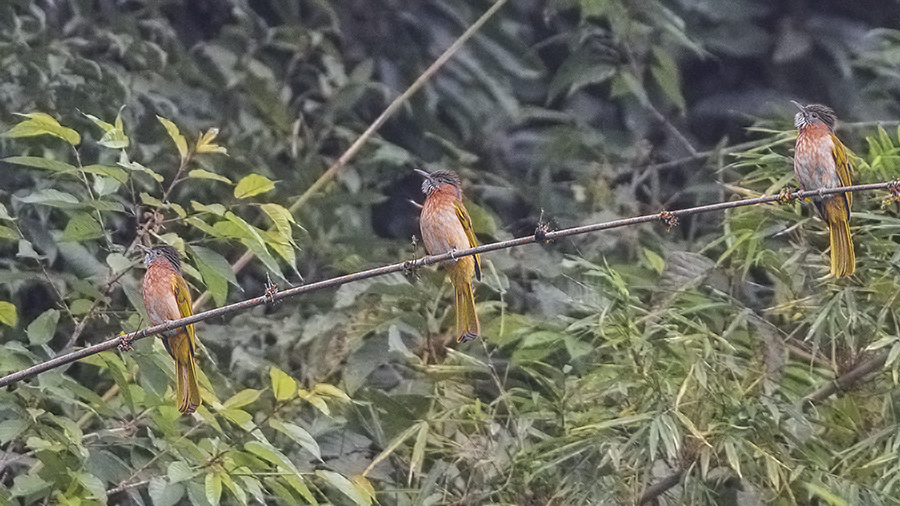
A flock from Pangolakha Wildlife Sanctuary, East Sikkim, India
