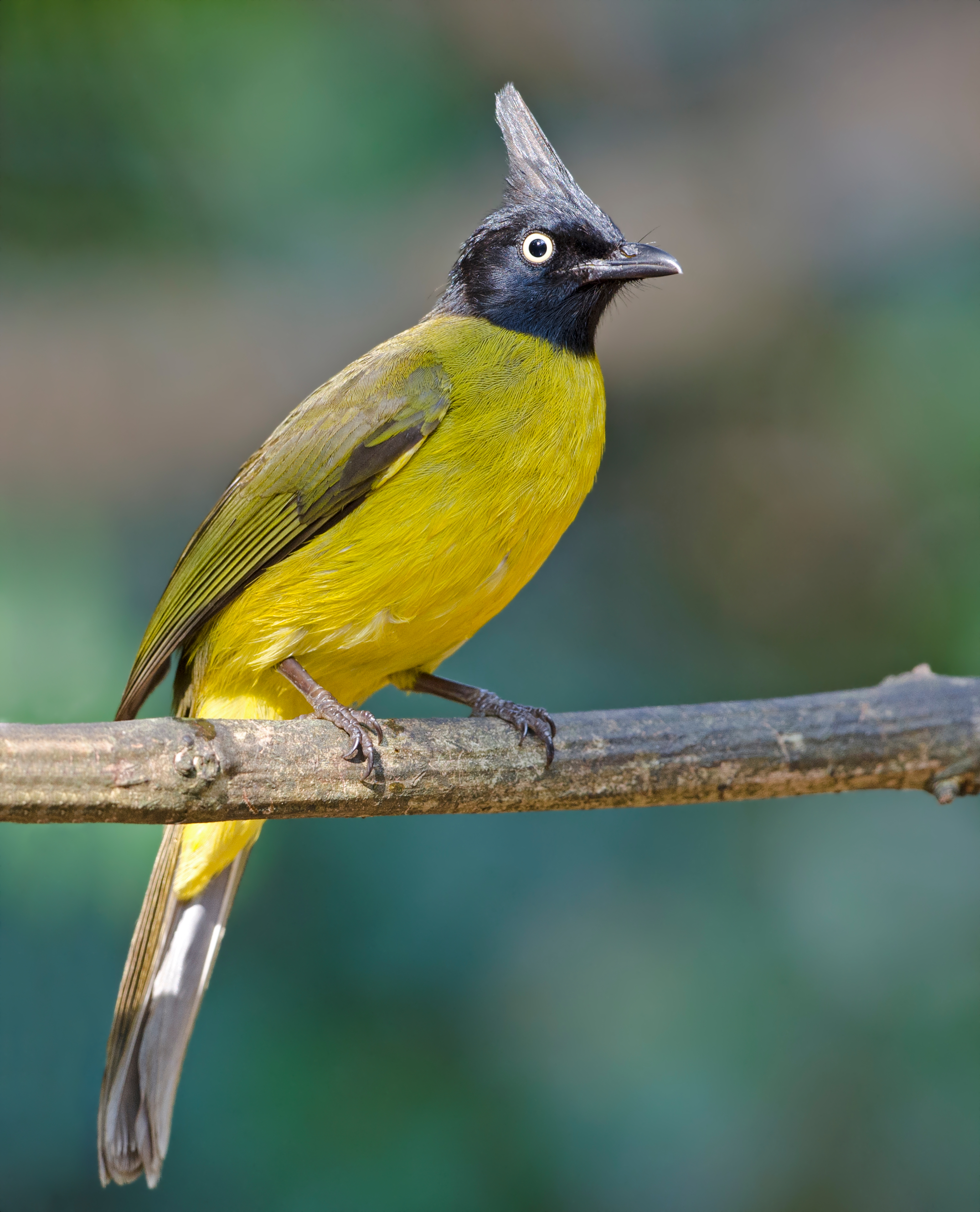
- Black-crested bulbul (Rubigula flaviventris)

Scientific classification
- Kingdom: Animalia
- Phylum: Chordata
- Class: Aves
- Order: Passeriformes
- Family: Pycnonotidae
- Genus: Rubigula; Blyth, 1845

Type species
- Turdus dispar (ruby-throated bulbul) Horsfield, 1821

= Rubigula =

Genus of birds

Rubigula is a genus of Asian passerine birds in the bulbul family, Pycnonotidae.

== Taxonomy ==
The genus Rubigula was introduced in 1845 by the English zoologist Edward Blyth. The type species was designated as the ruby-throated bulbul by George Robert Gray in 1855. The name combines the Medieval Latin rubinus meaning "ruby" with Latin gula meaning "throat".

This genus was formerly synonymized with the genus Pycnonotus. A molecular phylogenetic study of the bulbul family published in 2017 found that Pycnonotus was polyphyletic. In the revision to the generic classification five species were moved from Pycnonotus to Rubigula.

=== Species ===
The genus contains the following eight species:

Image	Scientific name	Common name	Distribution
	Rubigula flaviventris	Black-crested bulbul	montane South Asia to Malay peninsula
	Rubigula gularis	Flame-throated bulbul	Western Ghats
	Rubigula melanictera	Black-capped bulbul	Sri Lanka
	Rubigula dispar	Ruby-throated bulbul	Sumatra, Java, and Bali
	Rubigula montis	Bornean bulbul	Borneo montane rain forests
	Rubigula squamata	Scaly-breasted bulbul	montane Malaysia
	Rubigula cyaniventris	Grey-bellied bulbul	Malaysia
	Rubigula erythrophthalmos	Spectacled bulbul	Malaysia
