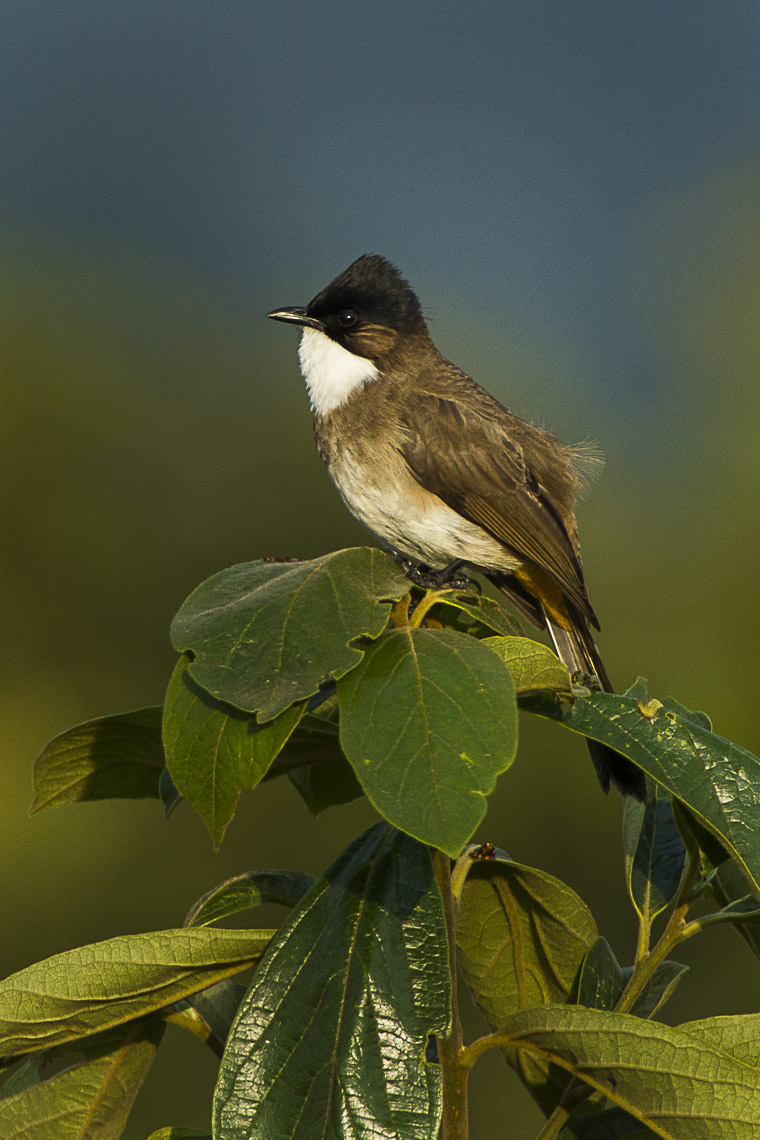
- In Thailand

Conservation status
- Least Concern (IUCN 3.1)

Scientific classification
- Kingdom: Animalia
- Phylum: Chordata
- Class: Aves
- Order: Passeriformes
- Family: Pycnonotidae
- Genus: Pycnonotus
- Species: P. xanthorrhous

Binomial name
- Pycnonotus xanthorrhous Anderson, 1869
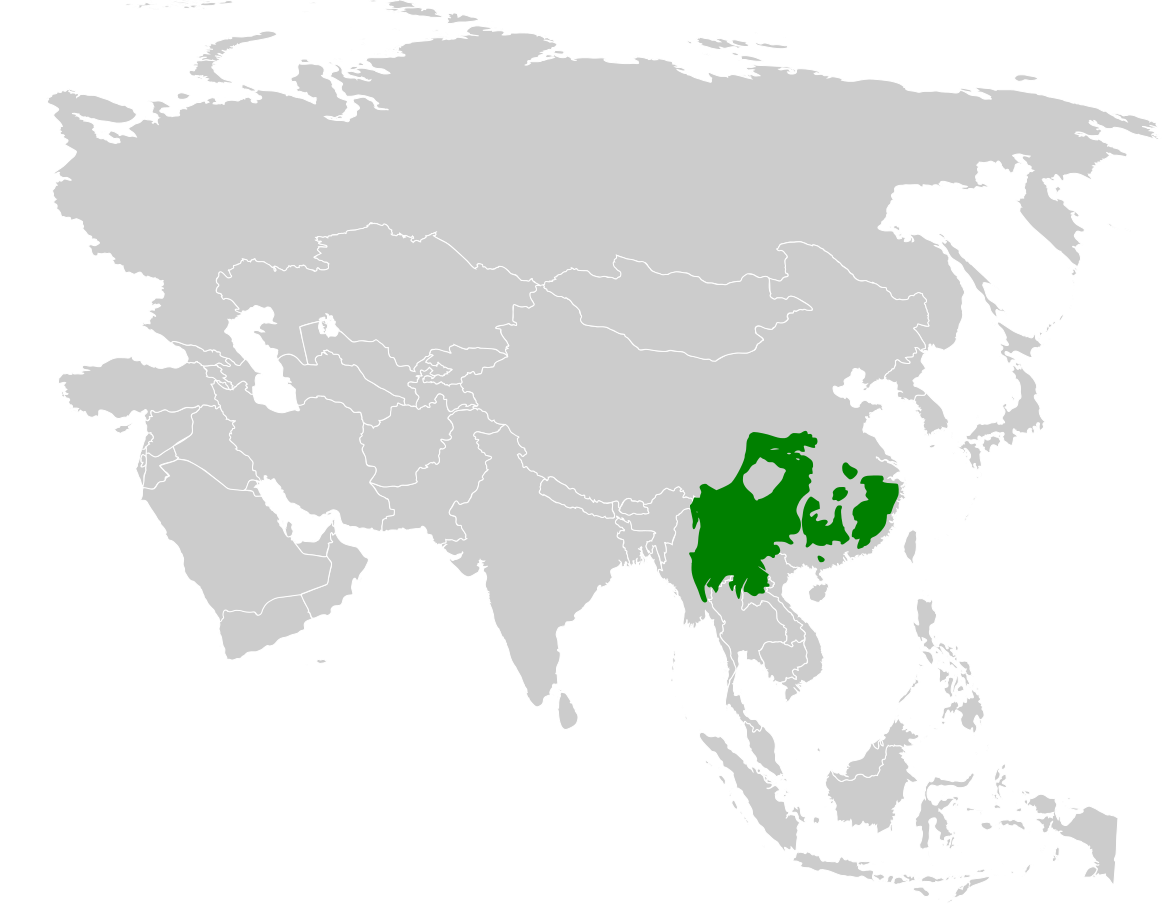

= Brown-breasted bulbul =

Species of bird

The brown-breasted bulbul (Pycnonotus xanthorrhous) is a songbird in the family Pycnonotidae. The species was first described by John Anderson in 1869. It is found in south-eastern Asia from central and southern China to Myanmar and northern Thailand.

== Taxonomy and systematics ==
Alternate names for the brown-breasted bulbul include Anderson's bulbul and yellow-vented bulbul (not to be confused with the species of the same name, Pycnonotus goiavier).

=== Subspecies ===
Two subspecies are recognized:

- P. x. xanthorrhous - Anderson, 1869: Found from south-western China and northern Myanmar to northern Indochina
- P. x. andersoni - (R. Swinhoe, 1870): Originally described as a separate species in the genus Ixos. Found in central and southern China

== Description ==
The brown-breasted bulbul is a medium-sized to large species of bulbul, reaching an average length of 20 cm (7.9 in) and an average mass of 24–31 g (0.85–1.09 oz). The upperparts are largely greyish-brown, with the exception of the head, which is black until the nape and lores. The throat is clean white, with a brown breastband that fades into the whitish belly. The vent is orange-yellow.

== Distribution and habitat ==
The brown-breasted bulbul is a native of East and Southeast Asia, being found across central and southern China, Myanmar, northern Vietnam, northern Laos, and northwestern Thailand. Partial to open wooded habitats, it is generally encountered in scrubland, secondary forests, open hillsides, riparian areas, and gardens. It is most abundant at elevations of 1,000–2,300 m (3,300–7,500 ft), but can be seen as low as 600 m (2,000 ft) and as high as 4,275 m (14,000 ft).

== Diet ==
It eats fruit, including Camellia japonica.
