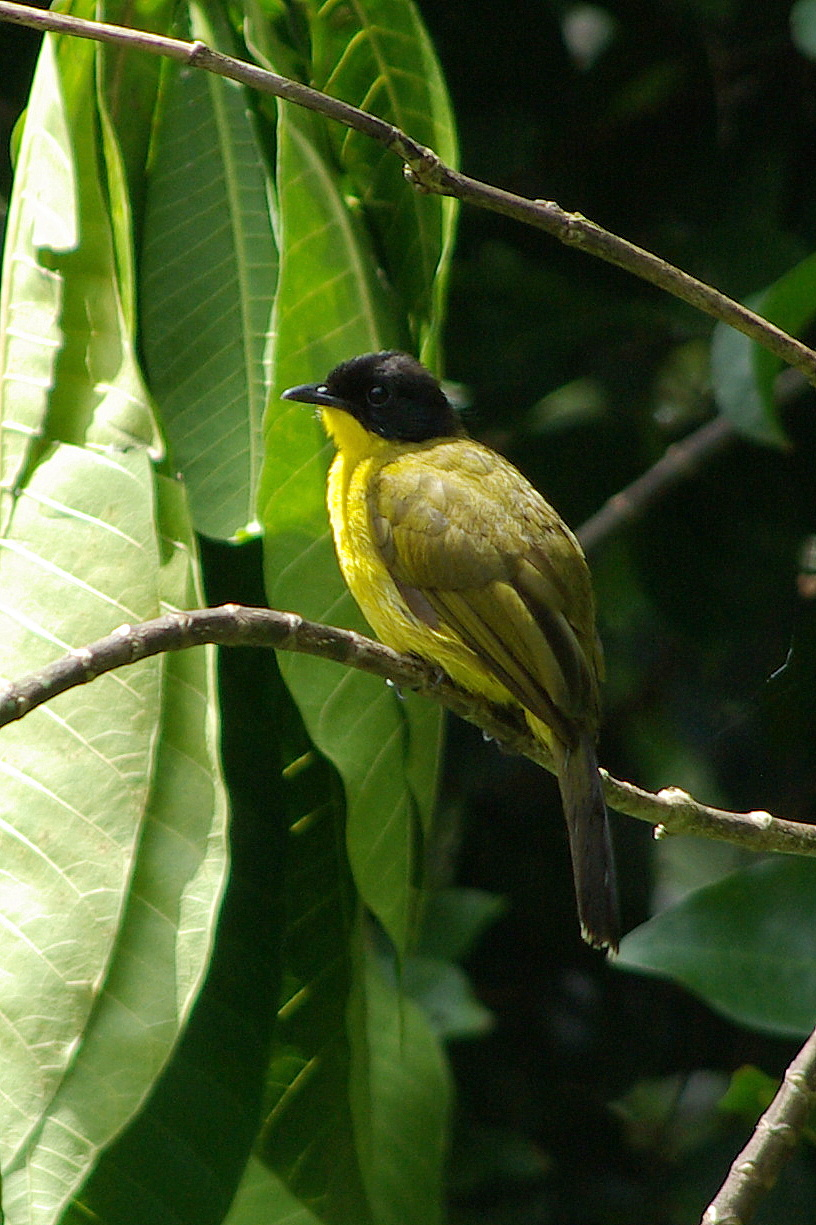

Conservation status
- Least Concern (IUCN 3.1)

Scientific classification
- Kingdom: Animalia
- Phylum: Chordata
- Class: Aves
- Order: Passeriformes
- Family: Pycnonotidae
- Genus: Rubigula
- Species: R. melanictera

Binomial name
- Rubigula melanictera (Gmelin, JF, 1789)

Synonyms
- Muscicapa melanictera J. F. Gmelin, 1789; Pycnonotus melanicterus; Rubigula melanictera

= Black-capped bulbul =

Species of bird

The black-capped bulbul (Rubigula melanictera), or black-headed yellow bulbul, is a member of the bulbul family of passerine birds. It is endemic to Sri Lanka.

== Taxonomy ==
The black-capped bulbul was formally described in 1789 by the German naturalist Johann Friedrich Gmelin in his revised and expanded edition of Carl Linnaeus's Systema Naturae. He placed it with the flycatchers in the genus Muscicapa and coined the binomial name Muscicapa melanictera. The specific epithet combines the Ancient Greek melas meaning "black" with ikteros meaning "jaundice-yellow". Gmelin based his description on the "yellow-breasted fly-catcher" from Sri Lanka that had been described and illustrated in 1776 by the English naturalist Peter Brown.

The black-capped bulbul was formerly placed in the genus Pycnonotus. A molecular phylogenetic study of the bulbul family published in 2017 found that Pycnonotus was polyphyletic. In the revision to the generic classification the black-capped bulbul and four other species were moved from Pycnonotus to Rubigula. Until 2008, the black-capped bulbul was considered as conspecific with the black-crested, ruby-throated, flame-throated and Bornean bulbuls. Some authorities have considered the ruby-throated, flame-throated and Bornean bulbuls to be subspecies of the black-capped bulbul.

== Description ==
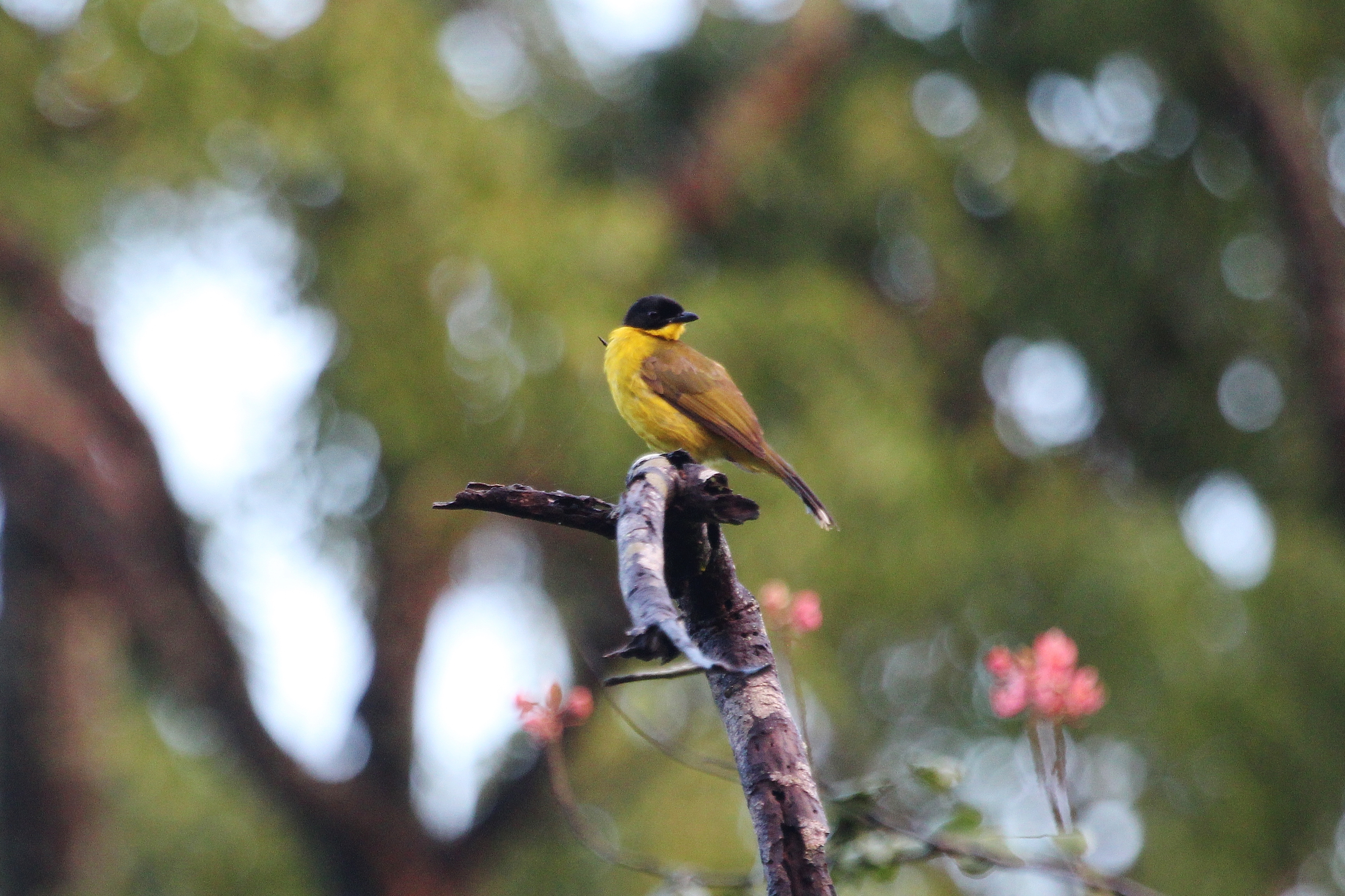
A Black capped Bulbul in Sigiriya, Sri Lanka.

The black-capped bulbul is virtually crestless and has a yellow throat and brownish eyes. It is yellowish green above and yellow below. The tail is brownish and ends in a white tip. The male has red irides and the female has brown irides. Calls include a broad repertoire of sweet, mellow, minor-key piping whistles and sharper calls. Breeding records are from March to September.

== Distribution and habitat ==
This is a bird of forest and dense scrub. It builds its nest in a bush; two to four eggs is a typical clutch. The black-capped bulbul feeds on fruit and insects. Found in forests, wooded areas and in gardens. Usually found in pairs.

== In culture ==
In Sri Lanka, this bird is known as Hisa kalu Kondaya - හිස කලු කොන්ඩයා in Sinhala language.
