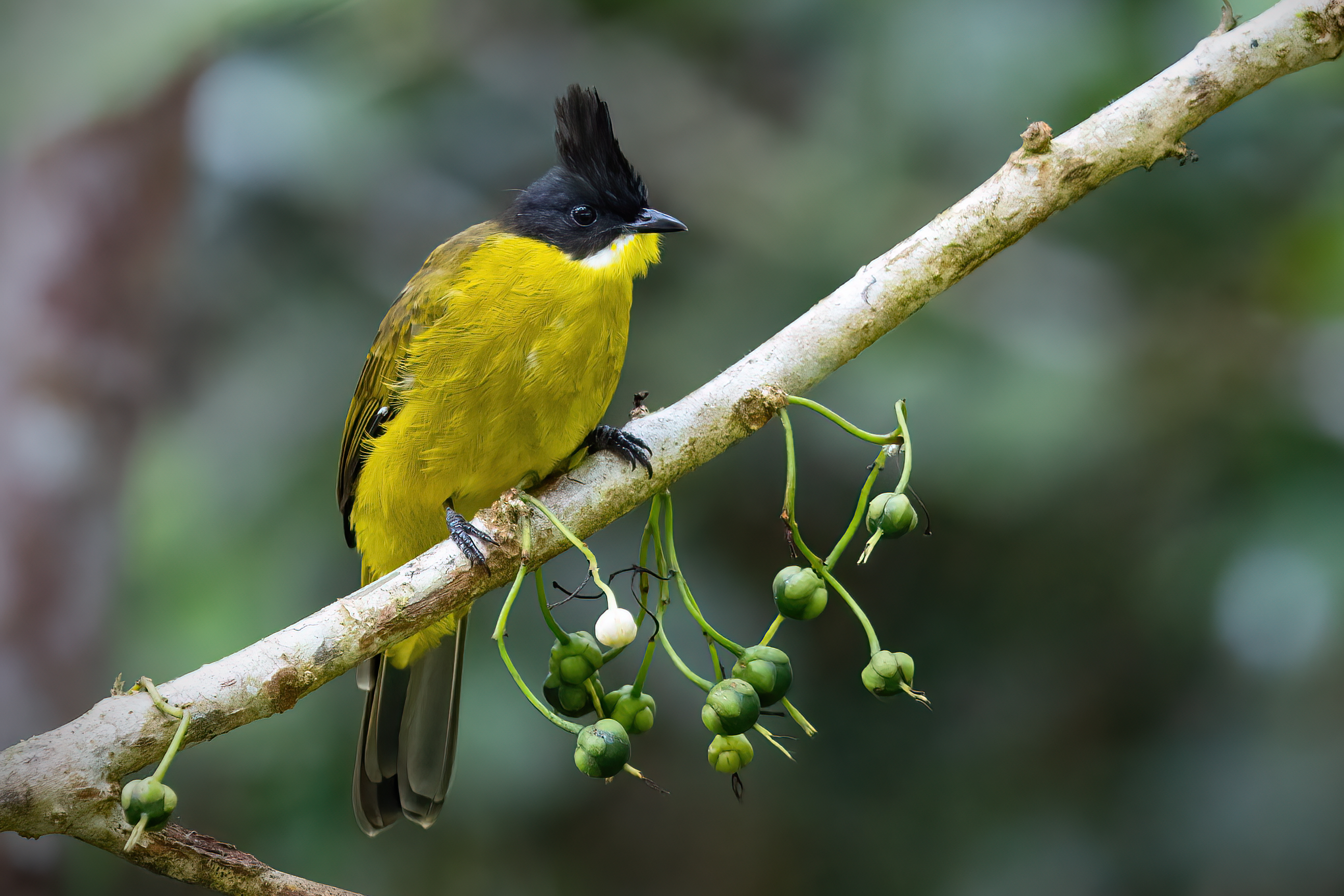

Conservation status
- Least Concern (IUCN 3.1)

Scientific classification
- Kingdom: Animalia
- Phylum: Chordata
- Class: Aves
- Order: Passeriformes
- Family: Pycnonotidae
- Genus: Rubigula
- Species: R. montis

Binomial name
- Rubigula montis Sharpe, 1879

Synonyms
- Pycnonotus montis; Pycnonotus melanicterus montis

= Bornean bulbul =

Species of bird

The Bornean bulbul (Rubigula montis) is a member of the bulbul family of passerine birds. It is endemic to the island of Borneo.

== Taxonomy and systematics ==
The Bornean bulbul was previously placed in genus Pycnonotus. This genus was found to be polyphyletic in recent molecular phylogenetic studies and five bulbul species, including the Bornean bulbul, moved to Rubigula.

Until 2008, the Bornean bulbul was considered as conspecific with the black-capped, black-crested, ruby-throated and flame-throated bulbuls. Some authorities have considered the Bornean bulbul to be a subspecies of the black-capped bulbul.

== Description ==
The Bornean bulbul has a black crest, yellow throat, and brownish eyes.

== Distribution and habitat ==
This is a bird of forest and dense scrub. It builds its nest in a bush; two to four eggs are a typical clutch.

== Behaviour and ecology ==
The Bornean bulbul feeds on fruit and insects.
