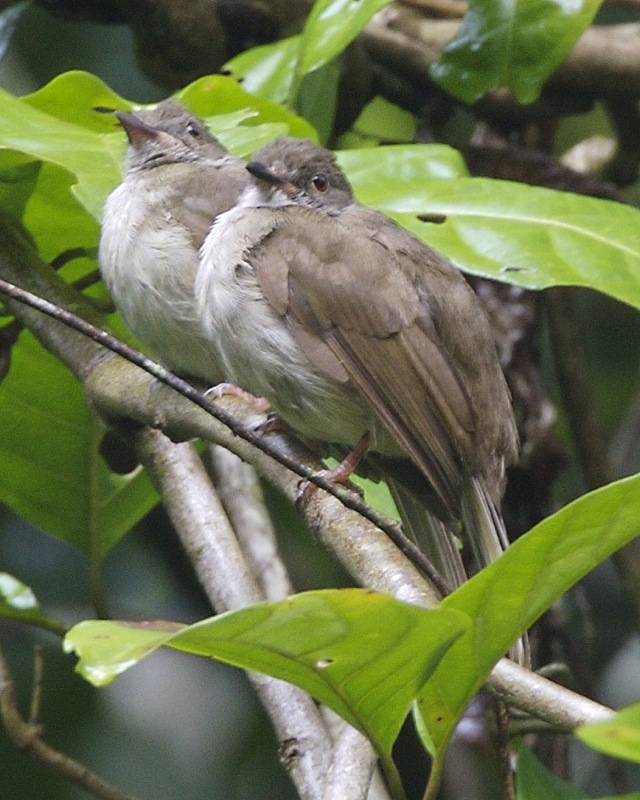
- In Panti forest, Johor, Malaysia

Conservation status
- Least Concern (IUCN 3.1)

Scientific classification
- Kingdom: Animalia
- Phylum: Chordata
- Class: Aves
- Order: Passeriformes
- Family: Pycnonotidae
- Genus: Rubigula
- Species: R. erythropthalmos

Binomial name
- Rubigula erythropthalmos (Hume, 1878)
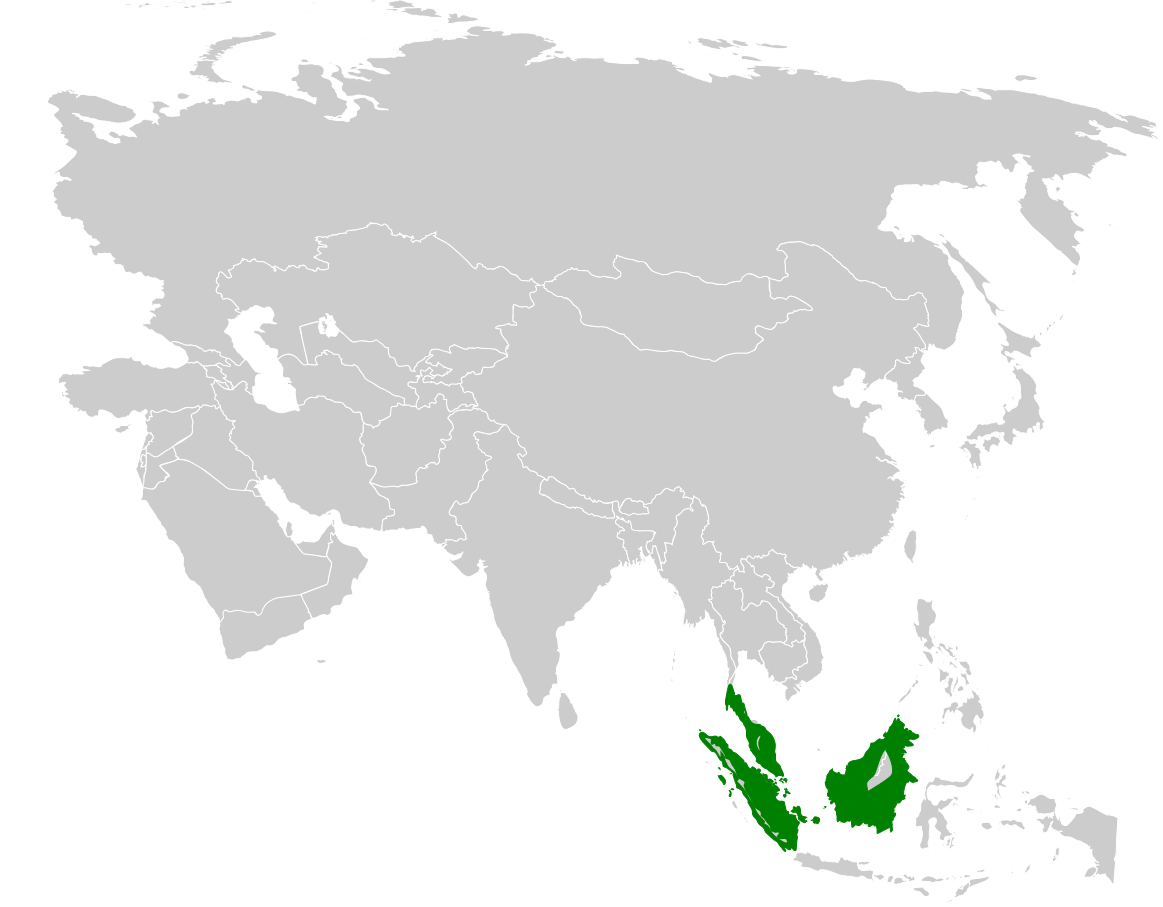

Synonyms
- Pycnonotus erythropthalmos; Ixidia erythropthalmos; Ixos erythropthalmos; Pycnonotus pusillus; Pycnonotus salvadorii; Rubigula erythropthalmos; Ixodia erythropthalmos

= Spectacled bulbul =

Species of bird

The spectacled bulbul (Rubigula erythropthalmos), also known as the lesser brown bulbul, is a member of the bulbul family of passerine birds. It is found on the Malay Peninsula, Sumatra, and Borneo. The spectacled bulbul was originally described in the genus Ixos.

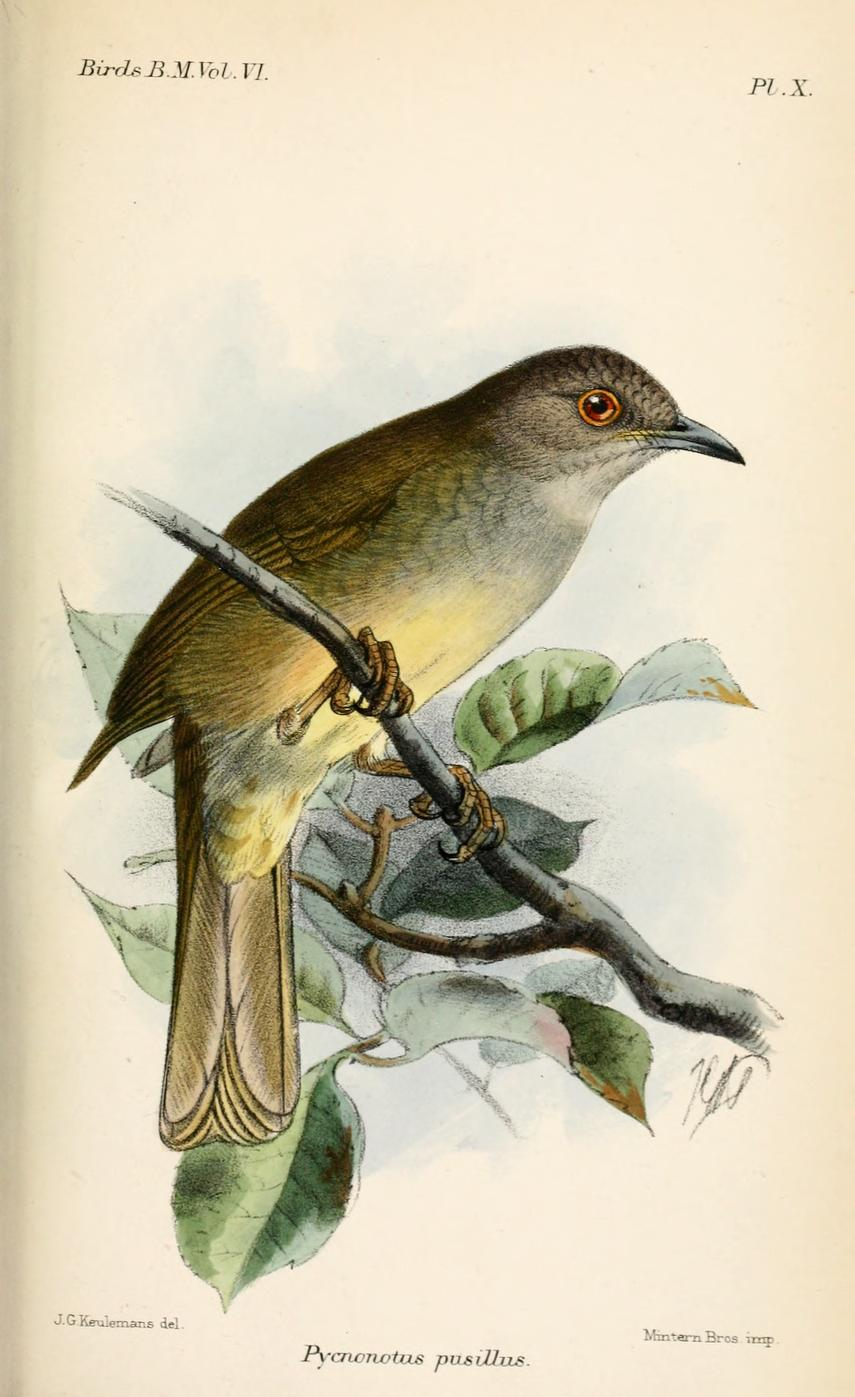
Illustration by Keulemans, 1881
