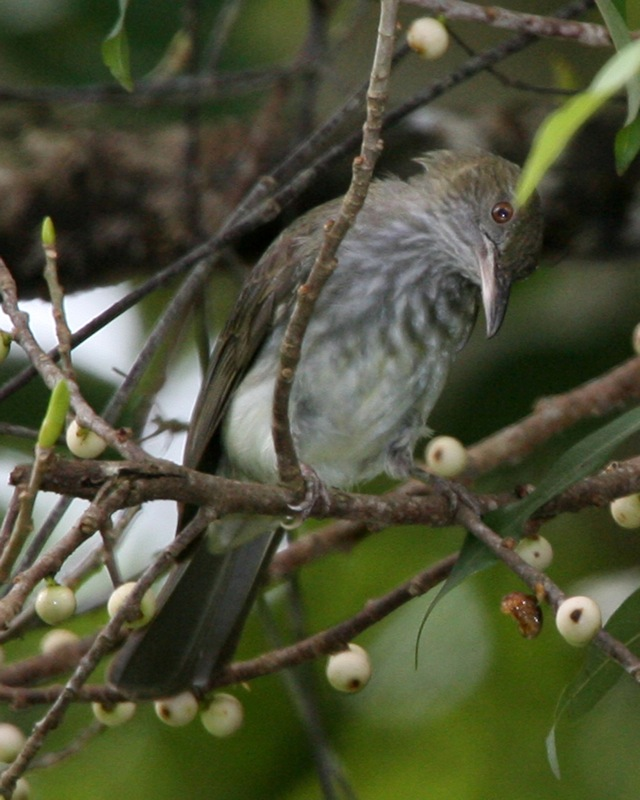

Conservation status
- Near Threatened (IUCN 3.1)

Scientific classification
- Kingdom: Animalia
- Phylum: Chordata
- Class: Aves
- Order: Passeriformes
- Family: Pycnonotidae
- Genus: Ixos
- Species: I. malaccensis

Binomial name
- Ixos malaccensis (Blyth, 1845)

Synonyms
- Hypsipetes malaccensis

= Streaked bulbul =

Species of bird

The streaked bulbul (Ixos malaccensis), or green-backed bulbul, is a songbird species in the bulbul family (Pycnonotidae). It is found on the Malay Peninsula, Sumatra, and Borneo. Its natural habitat is subtropical or tropical moist lowland forests. It is becoming rare due to habitat loss.

== Taxonomy and systematics ==
The current placement of the streaked bulbul in the genus Ixos is not fixed with any certainty. As the affiliations of the Javan bulbul (the type species of the genus) remain to be re-studied, it is not yet clear if the streaked bulbul should instead be placed in the genus Hemixos or possibly placed in a new genus. Both the alternate name 'green-backed bulbul' and the synonym Hypsipetes malaccensis are also shared with the eastern bearded greenbul. The name 'streaked bulbul' is also used as an alternate name for the Javan bulbul.
