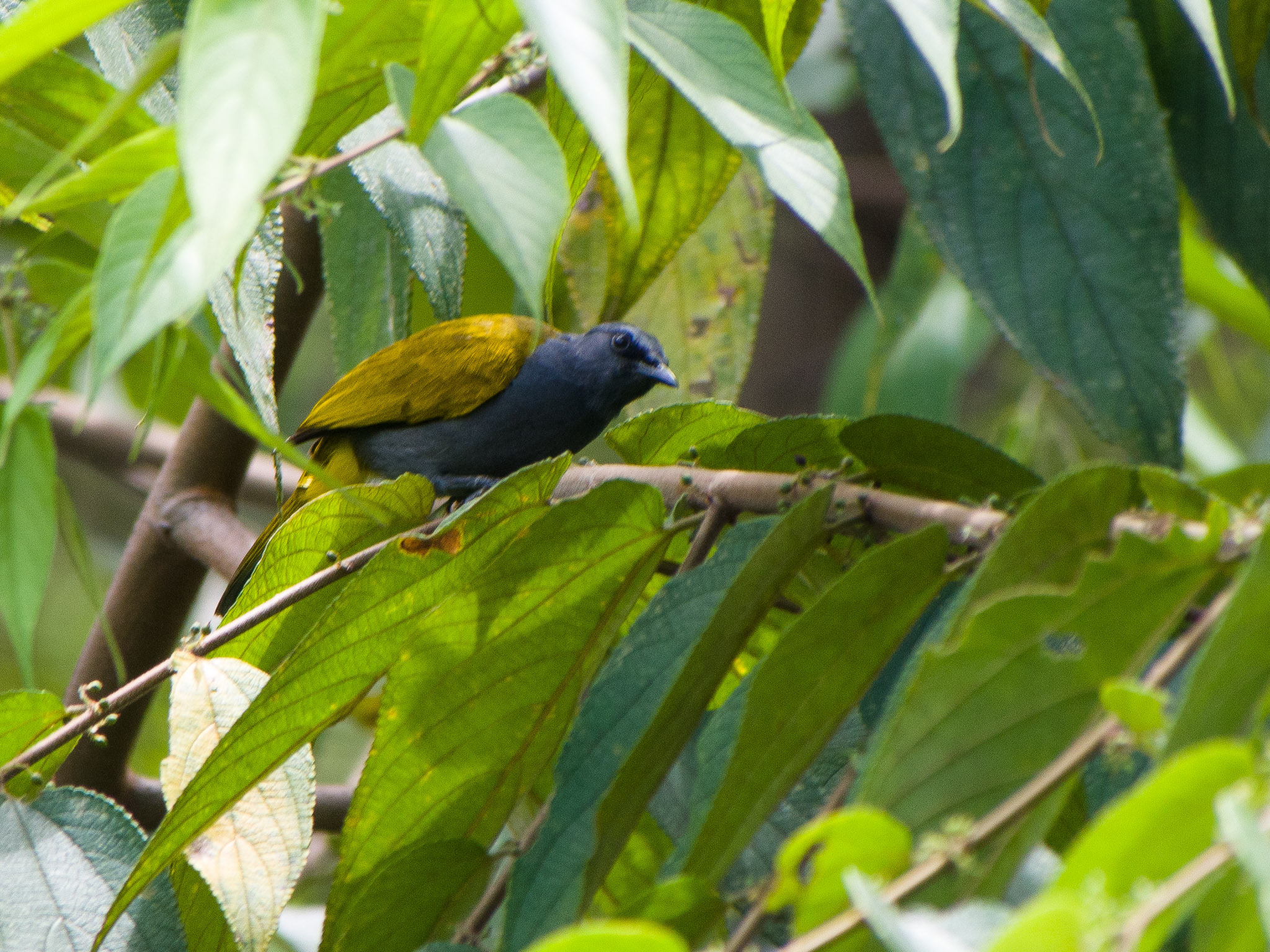

Conservation status
- Near Threatened (IUCN 3.1)

Scientific classification
- Kingdom: Animalia
- Phylum: Chordata
- Class: Aves
- Order: Passeriformes
- Family: Pycnonotidae
- Genus: Rubigula
- Species: R. cyaniventris

Binomial name
- Rubigula cyaniventris (Blyth, 1842)

Synonyms
- Ixodia cyaniventris; Rubigula cyaniventris; Pycnonotus cyaniventris; Ixidia cyaniventris

= Grey-bellied bulbul =

Species of songbird

The grey-bellied bulbul (Rubigula cyaniventris) is a species of songbird in the bulbul family. It is found on the Malay Peninsula, Sumatra and Borneo. Its natural habitat is subtropical or tropical moist lowland forests. It is threatened by habitat loss.

== Taxonomy and systematics ==
This species was previously placed in the large bulbul genus Pycnonotus, which was found to be polyphyletic in molecular phylogenetic studies, resulting in three species, including the grey-bellied bulbul, being moved to Ixodia. In 2025 AviList merged Ixodia into a more broadly defined Rubigula.

=== Subspecies ===
Two subspecies are recognised:

- R. c. cyaniventris (Blyth, 1842) – southern Myanmar to Thailand, Malayan Peninsula, Sumatra, and Sipura Island
- R. c. paroticalis (Sharpe, 1878) – Borneo
