= Sunda bulbul =

Sunda bulbul has been split into two species:

- Javan bulbul, Ixos virescens
- Sumatran bulbul, Ixos sumatranus
