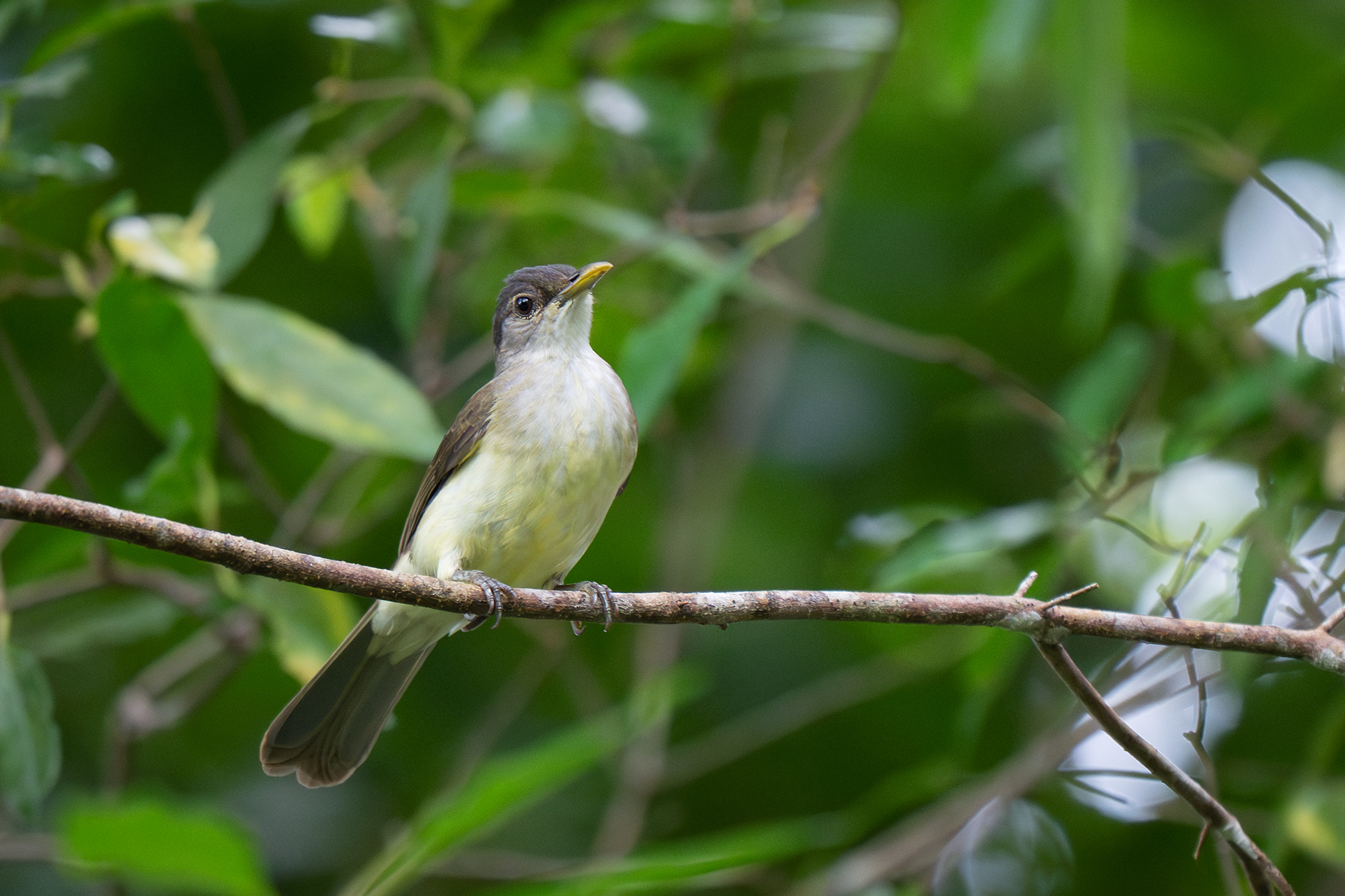

Conservation status
- Near Threatened (IUCN 3.1)

Scientific classification
- Kingdom: Animalia
- Phylum: Chordata
- Class: Aves
- Order: Passeriformes
- Family: Pycnonotidae
- Genus: Hypsipetes
- Species: H. nicobariensis

Binomial name
- Hypsipetes nicobariensis Moore, F, 1854

Synonyms
- Hypsipetes nicobariensis Moore, F, 1858; Hypsipetes virescens; Ixocincla virescens Blyth, 1845

= Nicobar bulbul =

Species of bird

The Nicobar bulbul (Hypsipetes nicobariensis) is a songbird species in the bulbul family, Pycnonotidae. It is endemic to the Nicobar Islands. This species has sometimes been placed in the genus Ixos.

== Taxonomy ==
The Nicobar bulbul was formally described in 1854 by the English entomologist and ornithologist Frederic Moore under the binomial name Hypsipetes nicobariensis. This was a replacement name for Ixocincla virescens Blyth 1845 which was preoccupied in Hypsipetes by Ixos virescens Temminck, 1825, the Javan bulbul. The Nicobar bulbul was formerly usually placed in the genus Ixos but was moved to Hypsipetes based on a molecular phylogenetic study published in 2024.

== Description ==
The Nicobar bulbul is a rather drab, nondescript species of about 20 cm in length and without a crest. Its wings, back and tail are dull dusky green; the face is lighter, and the throat and underside are yellowish-white. The most prominent feature is a sooty-brown cap reaching down to eye height.

The Nicobar bulbul produces chattering calls, similar to those of the black bulbul.

== Distribution and habitat ==
It is endemic to the Nicobar Islands, where it only occurs in the central group, namely Bompoka, Camorta, Katchall, Nancowry, Teressa, Tillanchong and Trinkat; a supposed 19th century record from Pilo Milo in the southern group is nowadays generally dismissed.

Its natural habitats are subtropical and tropical moist lowland primary and secondary forest. It also visits plantations, rural gardens, and occasionally urban areas and grassland. Restricted to a few islands, it is threatened with extinction in the long-term future. Already in the early 1990s, though the species was still found on every major island in its range, only single birds or families were usually seen except on Katchall and Teressa. Only in some places on the former was it still as common then as it used to be 100 years ago. At present, it manages to hold its own, but only barely, and habitat loss may have been severe enough to accelerate its decline to dangerous proportions. With altogether a few thousand adult birds remaining, it is classified as Near Threatened by the IUCN.

== Behaviour and ecology ==
Several factors have contributed to this species' decline. For one thing, habitat destruction such as logging for rubber plantations has encroached upon the native forest, and while more sustainable forest uses by humans are tolerated well enough, monocultures are of little use to this island endemic and are utilized only infrequently. An increasing human population has resulted in much clear-cutting in the mid-late 20th century, and expansion of military installations in these frontier islands has also resulted in considerable habitat destruction.

Also, the red-whiskered bulbul was introduced to Camorta by the British; it was later brought to other islands in the Nancowry group by locals, who, like many people elsewhere, consider the red-whiskered bulbul a popular pet. The two bulbuls presumably compete for food, nesting locations and other resources, and if the human-assisted P. j. whistleri is not actually displacing I. nicobariensis, being well-established on Katchall, Nancowry, Teressa and Trinkat, it is certainly keeping the Nicobar bulbul's population lower than it could be. On the other hand, there is no reason to suppose that the native species is an inferior competitor; rather the two bulbuls' populations seem to be reaching an equilibrium: on Katchall, the red-whiskered bulbul was already established in the 1910s or so, and this has not prevented healthy Nicobar bulbul stocks from persisting on that island to the present day.

The Nicobar Islands were hit hard by the 2004 Indian Ocean tsunami, and the central group was perhaps most severely affected, with at least hundreds, maybe thousands of its inhabitants dead. On Katchall, there was perhaps the highest loss of life in the entire Nicobars, but this was due to catastrophic destruction of settled areas and much of the island's interior forest was not affected. Trinkat was literally torn into three pieces, while on Camorta flooding was extreme in the northern part only. Nancowry on the other hand suffered rather little damage overall. On Teressa, the low-lying plains suffered extensive flooding, bisecting the island in fact, but the remaining forest fragments are mostly confined to the hills and were spared. Bompoka and Tillanchong, though small, are quite steep and consequently were not much affected. Though the effect upon the Nicobar bulbul's population on Trinkat, for example, might have been devastating, the tsunami is not known to have significantly harmed the overall stocks of the species.

== Sources ==
- BirdLife International (BLI) (2009): Nicobar Bulbul Species Factsheet. Retrieved 2009-JUN-06.
- Gregory, Steven M. (2000): Nomenclature of the Hypsipetes Bulbuls (Pycnonotidae). Forktail 16: 164–166. PDF fulltext
- Isles (2005): Satellite pictures of Tsunami 2004 from India's satellites. Version of 2005-SEP-04. Retrieved 2009-JUN-06.
- National Remote Sensing Centre (NRSC) (2009): Tsunami case Studies: Nadaman/Nicobar Islands. Version of January 2009. Retrieved 2009-JUN-06.
- Sankaran, R. (1998): An annotated list of the endemic avifauna of the Nicobar islands. Forktail 13: 17–22. PDF fulltext
- Image andaman bird watching at andamanbirdwatching.com
