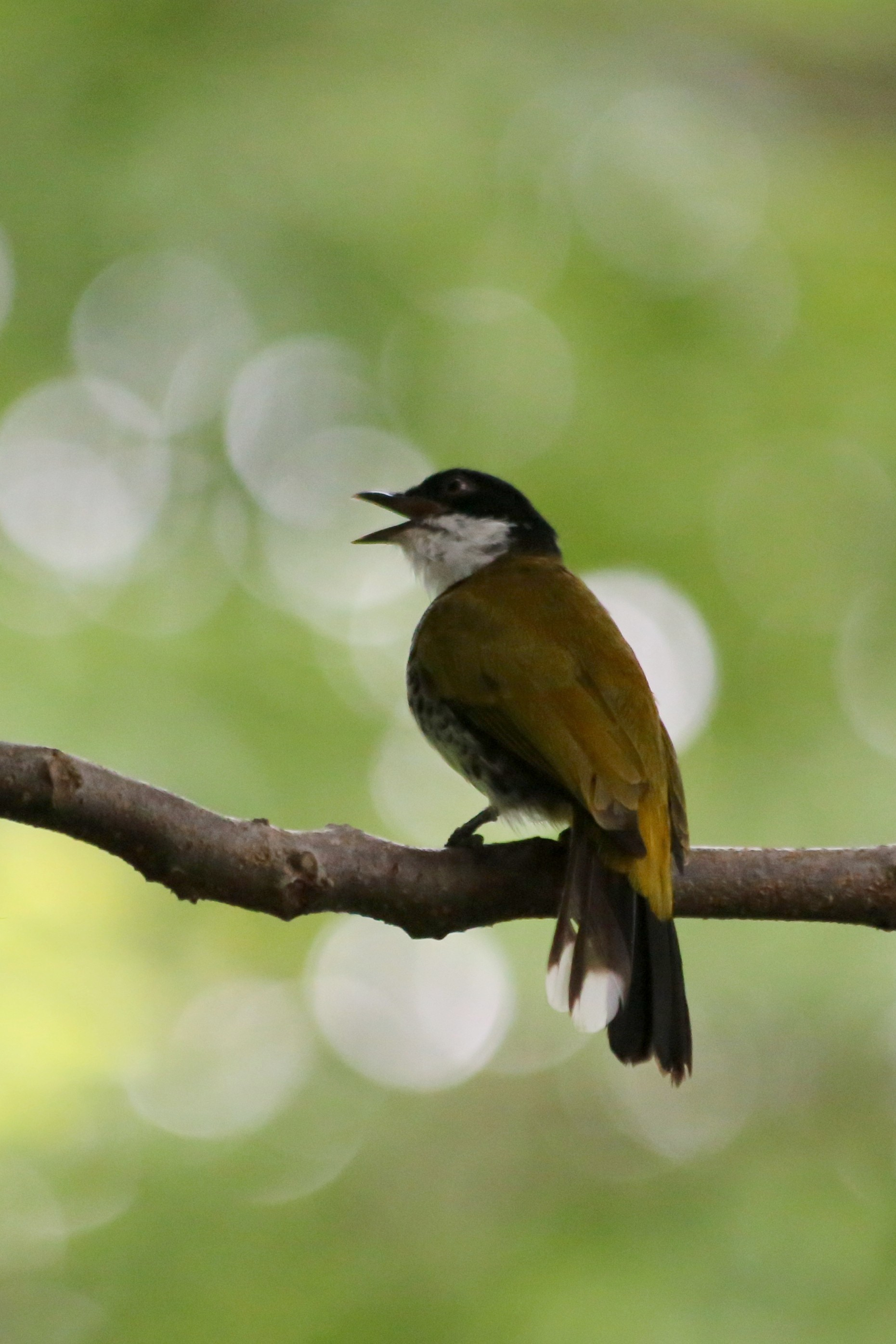

Conservation status
- Near Threatened (IUCN 3.1)

Scientific classification
- Kingdom: Animalia
- Phylum: Chordata
- Class: Aves
- Order: Passeriformes
- Family: Pycnonotidae
- Genus: Rubigula
- Species: R. squamata

Binomial name
- Rubigula squamata (Temminck, 1828)

Synonyms
- Ixidia squamata; Ixos squamatus; Pycnonotus squamatus; Rubigula squamata; Ixodia squamata

= Scaly-breasted bulbul =

Species of songbird

The scaly-breasted bulbul (Rubigula squamata) is a species of songbird in the bulbul family. It is found from the Malay Peninsula to Borneo. Its natural habitat is subtropical or tropical moist lowland forests. It is threatened by habitat loss.

== Taxonomy and systematics ==
The scaly-breasted bulbul was originally described in the genus Ixos and later moved to Pycnonotus. Pycnonotus was found to be polyphyletic in molecular phylogenetic studies and three bulbul species, including the scaly-breasted bulbul, moved to Ixodia. In 2025 AviList merged Ixodia into a more broadly defined Rubigula.

=== Subspecies ===
Three subspecies are recognized:

- R. s. webberi (Hume, 1879): originally described as a separate species. Found on the Malay Peninsula and Sumatra
- R. s. squamatus (Temminck, 1828): found on Java
- R. s. borneensis (Chasen, 1941): found on Borneo
