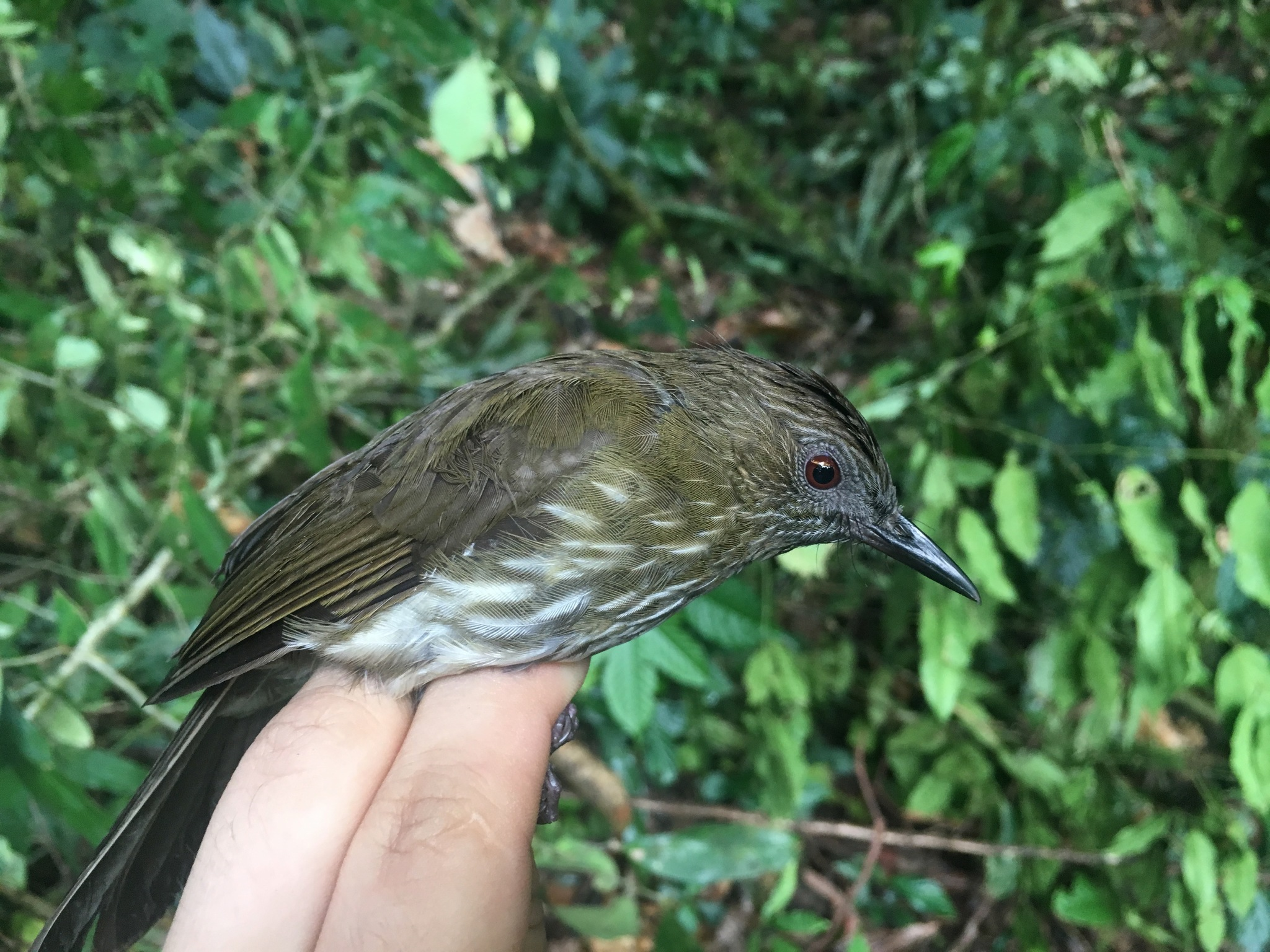

Conservation status
- Least Concern (IUCN 3.1)

Scientific classification
- Kingdom: Animalia
- Phylum: Chordata
- Class: Aves
- Order: Passeriformes
- Family: Pycnonotidae
- Genus: Ixos
- Species: I. sumatranus

Binomial name
- Ixos sumatranus (Wardlaw-Ramsay, 1882)

= Sumatran bulbul =

Species of songbird

The Sumatran bulbul (Ixos sumatranus) is a species of songbird in the bulbul family, Pycnonotidae. It is endemic to Sumatra (Indonesia).
