= Bearded bulbul =

Bearded bulbul may refer to:

- Eastern bearded greenbul, a species of bird found in central Africa
- Western bearded greenbul, a species of bird found in western Africa
