= White-throated bearded greenbul =

White-throated bearded greenbul may refer to:

- Eastern bearded greenbul, a species of bird found in central Africa
- White-throated bulbul, a species of bird found in south-eastern Asia
