= Olivaceous bulbul =

Olivaceous bulbul may refer to:

- Puff-throated bulbul, a species of bird found in Southeast Asia
- Réunion bulbul, a species of bird endemic to Réunion
