= Scrub bulbul =

Scrub bulbul may refer to the following species of birds:

- Grey-cheeked bulbul, found in south-eastern Asia
- Terrestrial brownbul, found in eastern and south-eastern Africa
