= Hypsipetes malaccensis =

Hypsipetes malaccensis may refer to:

- Eastern bearded greenbul, a species of bird found in Equatorial Africa
- Streaked bulbul, a species of bird found on the Malay Peninsula, Sumatra, and Borneo
