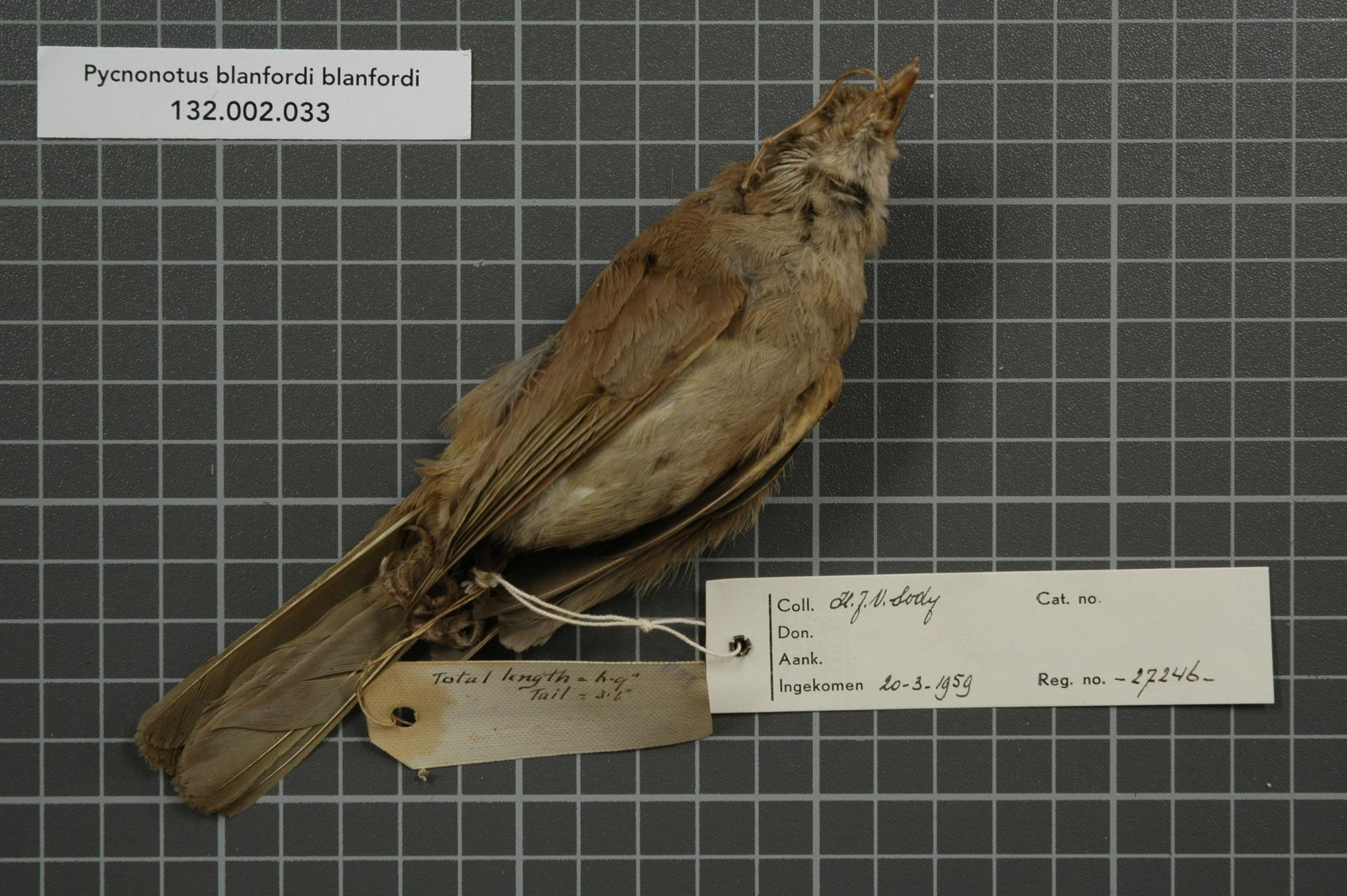

Conservation status
- Least Concern (IUCN 3.1)

Scientific classification
- Kingdom: Animalia
- Phylum: Chordata
- Class: Aves
- Order: Passeriformes
- Family: Pycnonotidae
- Genus: Pycnonotus
- Species: P. blanfordi

Binomial name
- Pycnonotus blanfordi Jerdon, 1862
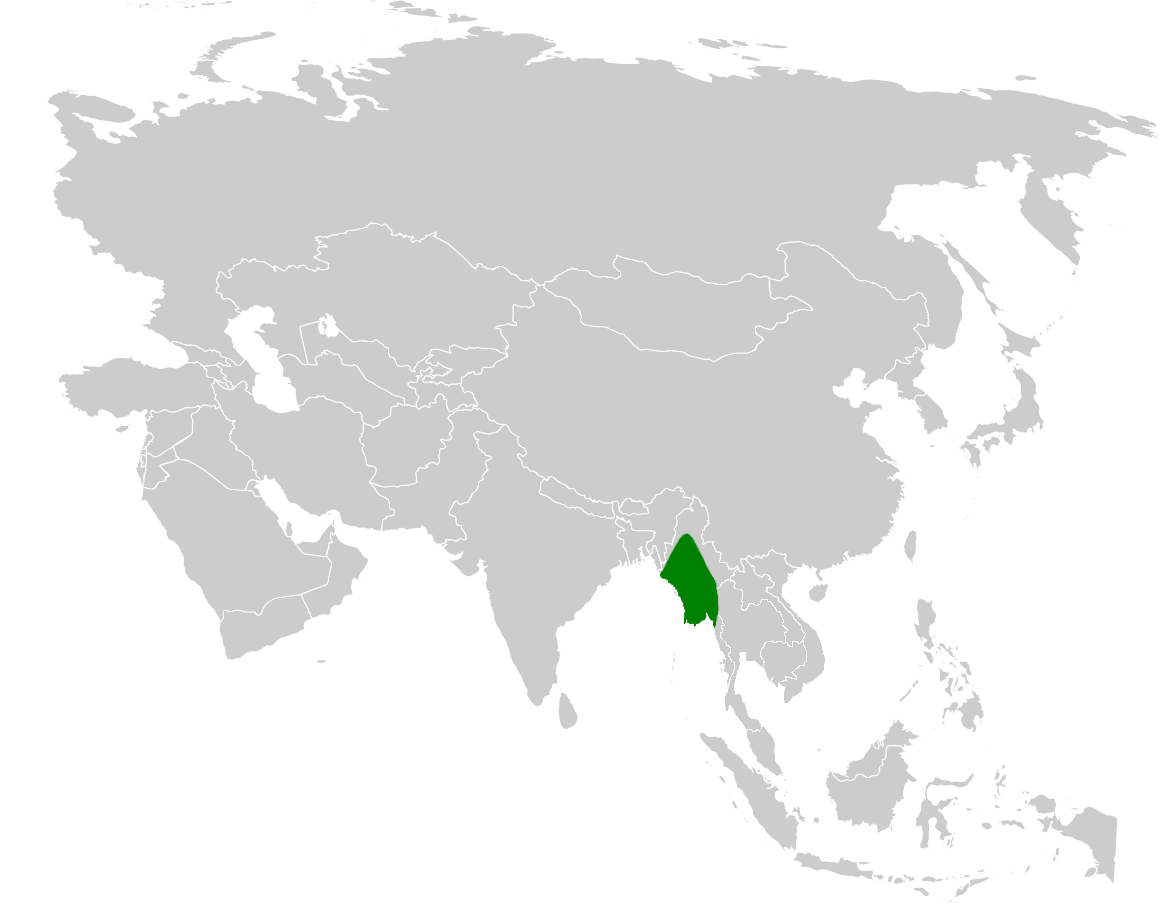

= Ayeyarwady bulbul =

Species of bird

The Ayeyarwady bulbul (Pycnonotus blanfordi) is a member of the bulbul family of passerine birds. It is endemic to Myanmar. Its natural habitat is subtropical or tropical moist lowland forests. Until 2016, the Ayeyarwady bulbul was considered to be conspecific with the streak-eared bulbul (now Pycnonotus conradi).

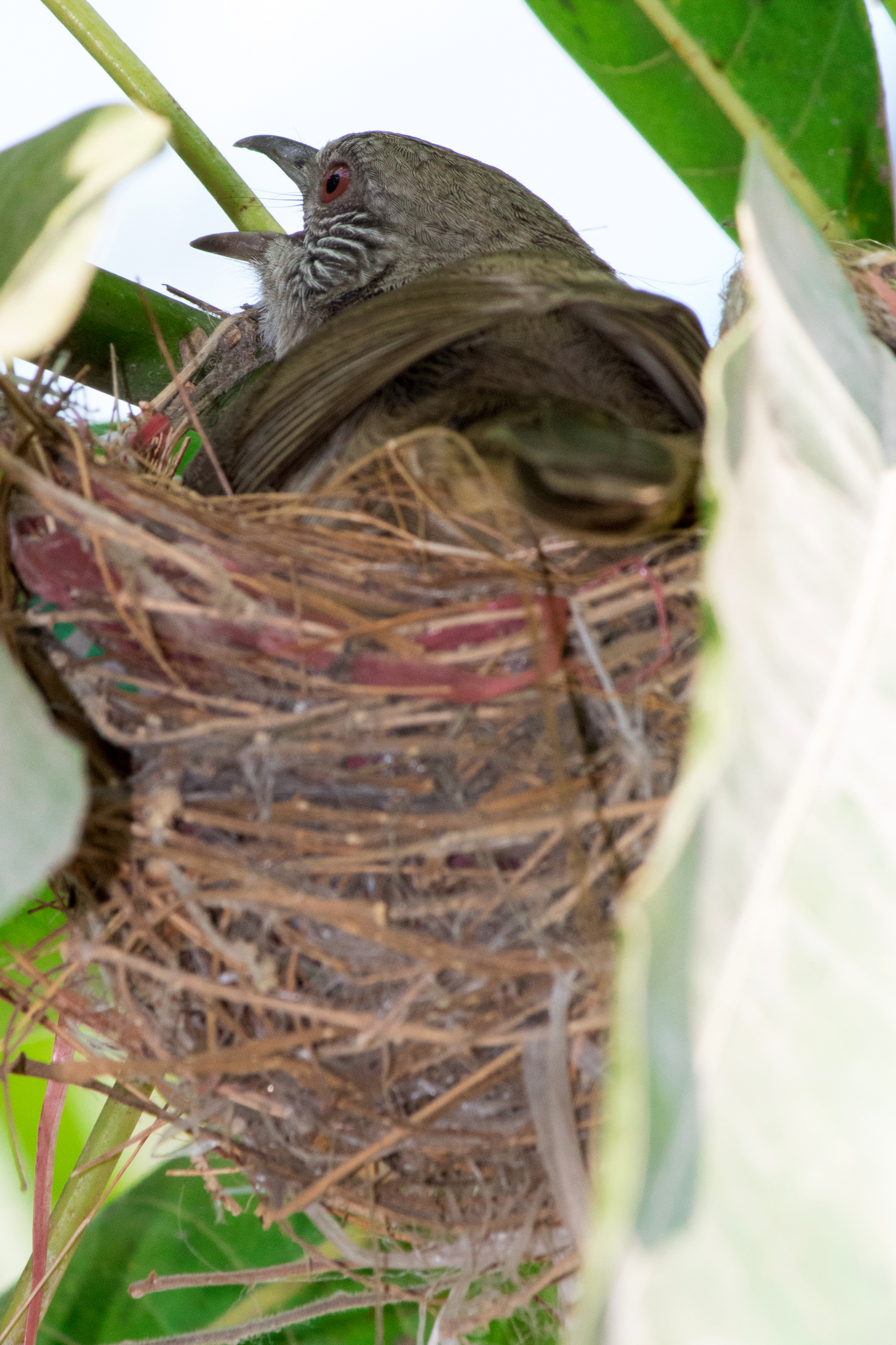
Ayeyarwady bulbul on nest
