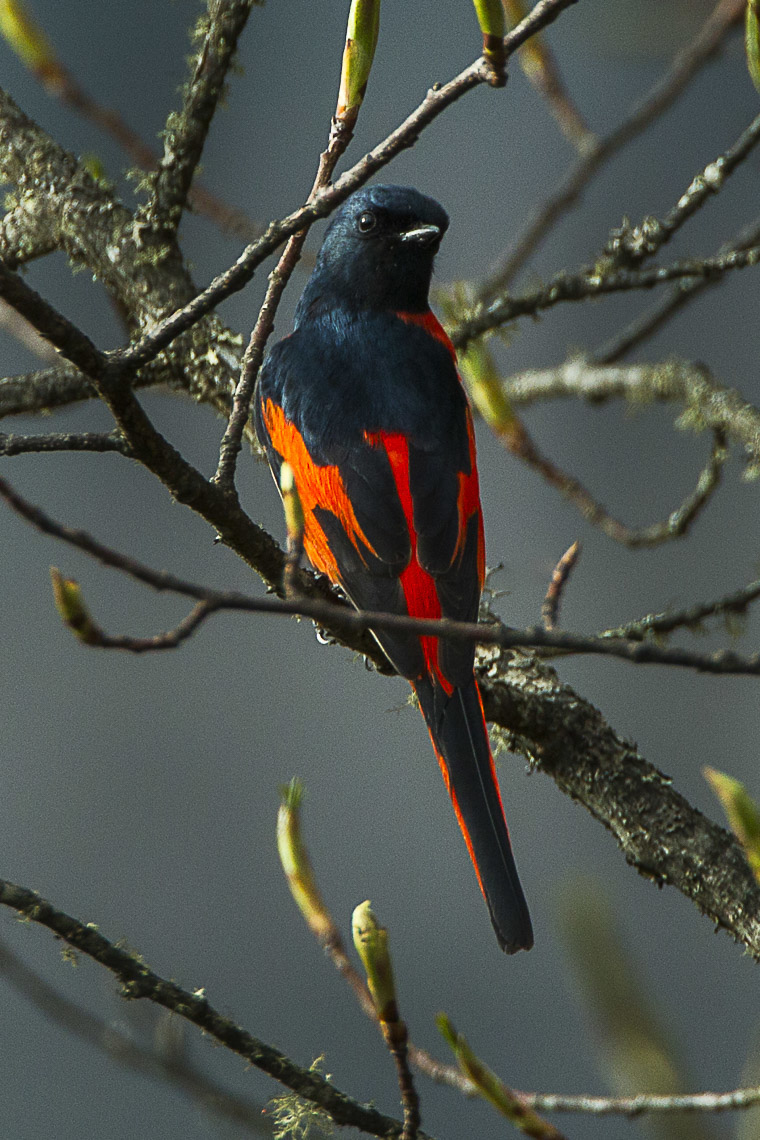

Conservation status
- Least Concern (IUCN 3.1)

Scientific classification
- Kingdom: Animalia
- Phylum: Chordata
- Class: Aves
- Order: Passeriformes
- Family: Campephagidae
- Genus: Pericrocotus
- Species: P. ethologus

Binomial name
- Pericrocotus ethologus Bangs & Phillips, JC, 1914

= Long-tailed minivet =

Species of bird

The long-tailed minivet (Pericrocotus ethologus) is a species of bird in the family Campephagidae. It is found in southern and south-eastern Asia where it occurs in Afghanistan, Bangladesh, Bhutan, China, India, Laos, Myanmar, Nepal, Pakistan, Thailand, and Vietnam. Its natural habitats are subtropical or tropical moist lowland forest and subtropical or tropical moist montane forest.

== Gallery ==
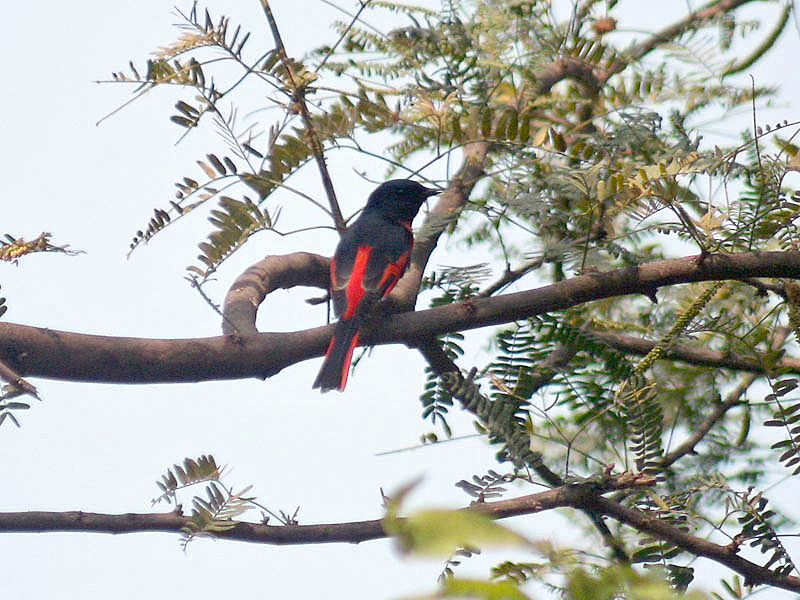
Male at Bharatpur, Rajasthan, India

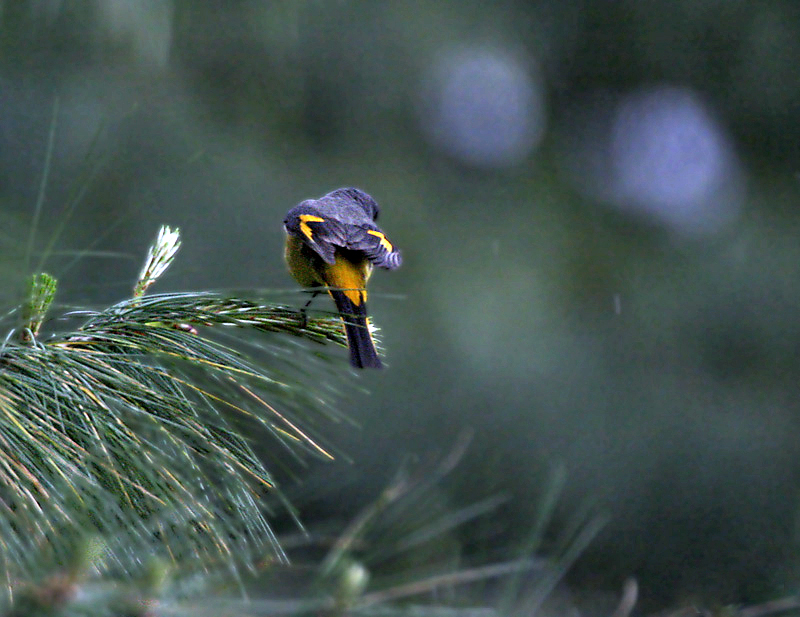
Female at 10000 ft. in Kullu - Manali District of Himachal Pradesh, India
