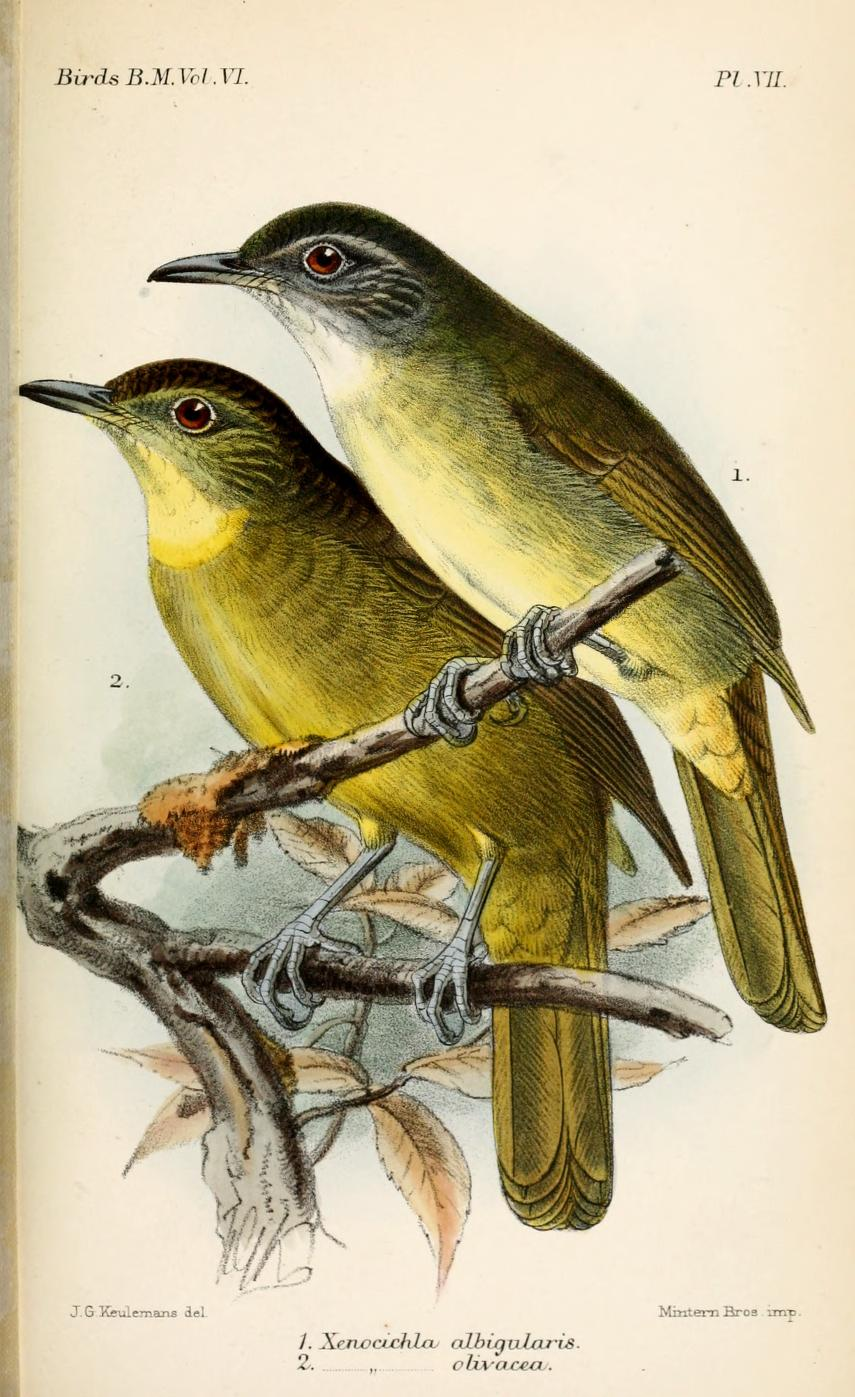
- White-bearded greenbul (above), and yellow-bearded greenbul (below)
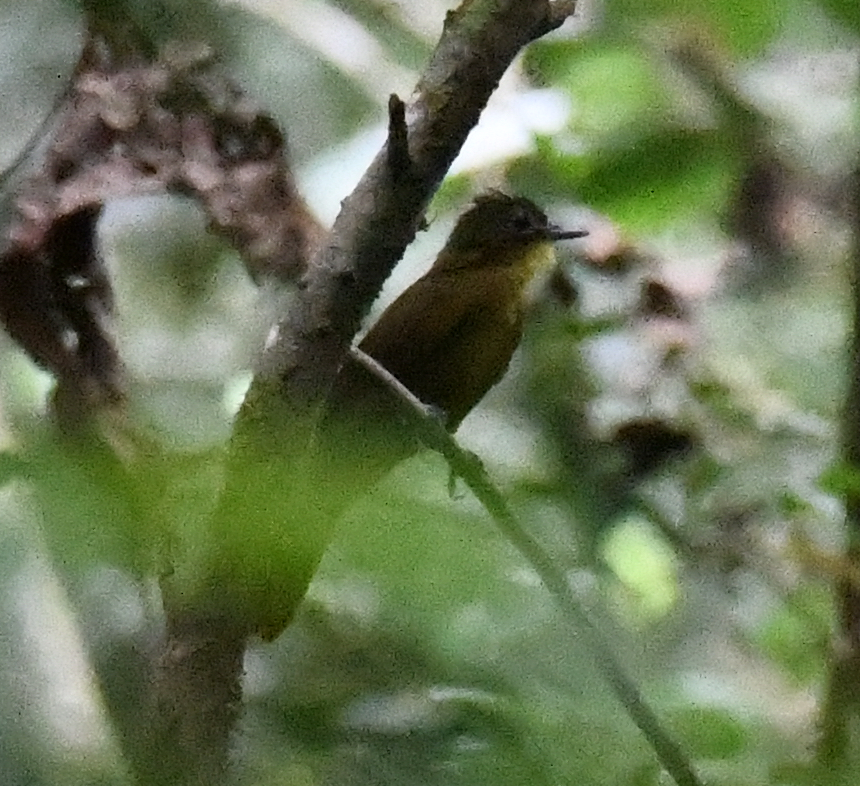

Conservation status
- Vulnerable (IUCN 3.1)

Scientific classification
- Kingdom: Animalia
- Phylum: Chordata
- Class: Aves
- Order: Passeriformes
- Family: Pycnonotidae
- Genus: Criniger
- Species: C. olivaceus

Binomial name
- Criniger olivaceus (Swainson, 1837)
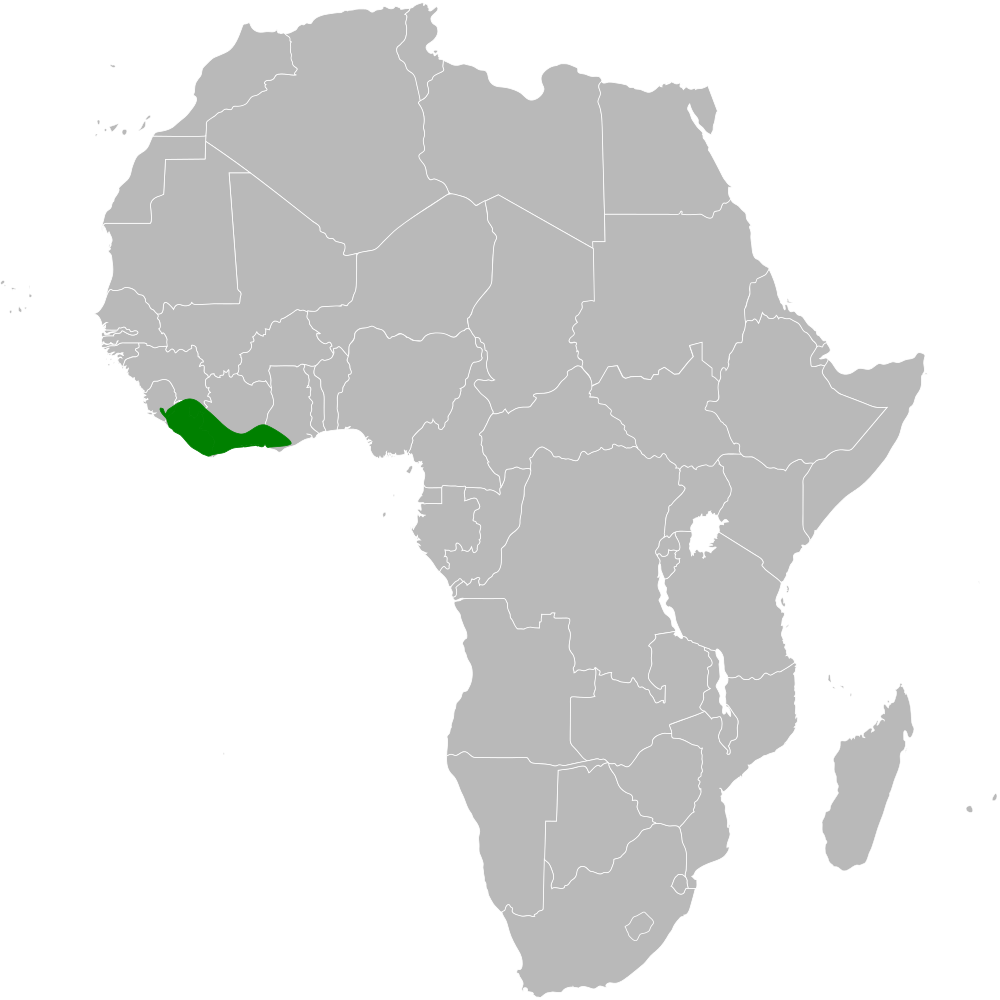

Synonyms
- Trichophorus olivaceus; Xenocichla olivacea

= Yellow-bearded greenbul =

Species of songbird

The yellow-bearded greenbul (Criniger olivaceus) is a species of songbird in the bulbul family, Pycnonotidae. It is found in western Africa.

== Taxonomy and systematics ==
Alternatively, the yellow-bearded greenbul has been classified in the genus Xenocichla (a synonym for Bleda) and has also been considered as conspecific with the white-bearded greenbul. Alternate names for the yellow-bearded greenbul include the olive bulbul, olive greenbul, olive-bearded bulbul, yellow-bearded bulbul, yellow-throated olive bulbul and yellow-throated olive greenbul. The name 'olive bulbul' should not be confused with the species of the same name, Iole virescens.

== Distribution and habitat ==
It is found in West Africa from eastern Sierra Leone to south-western Ghana. Its natural habitat is subtropical or tropical moist lowland forests. It is threatened by habitat loss.
