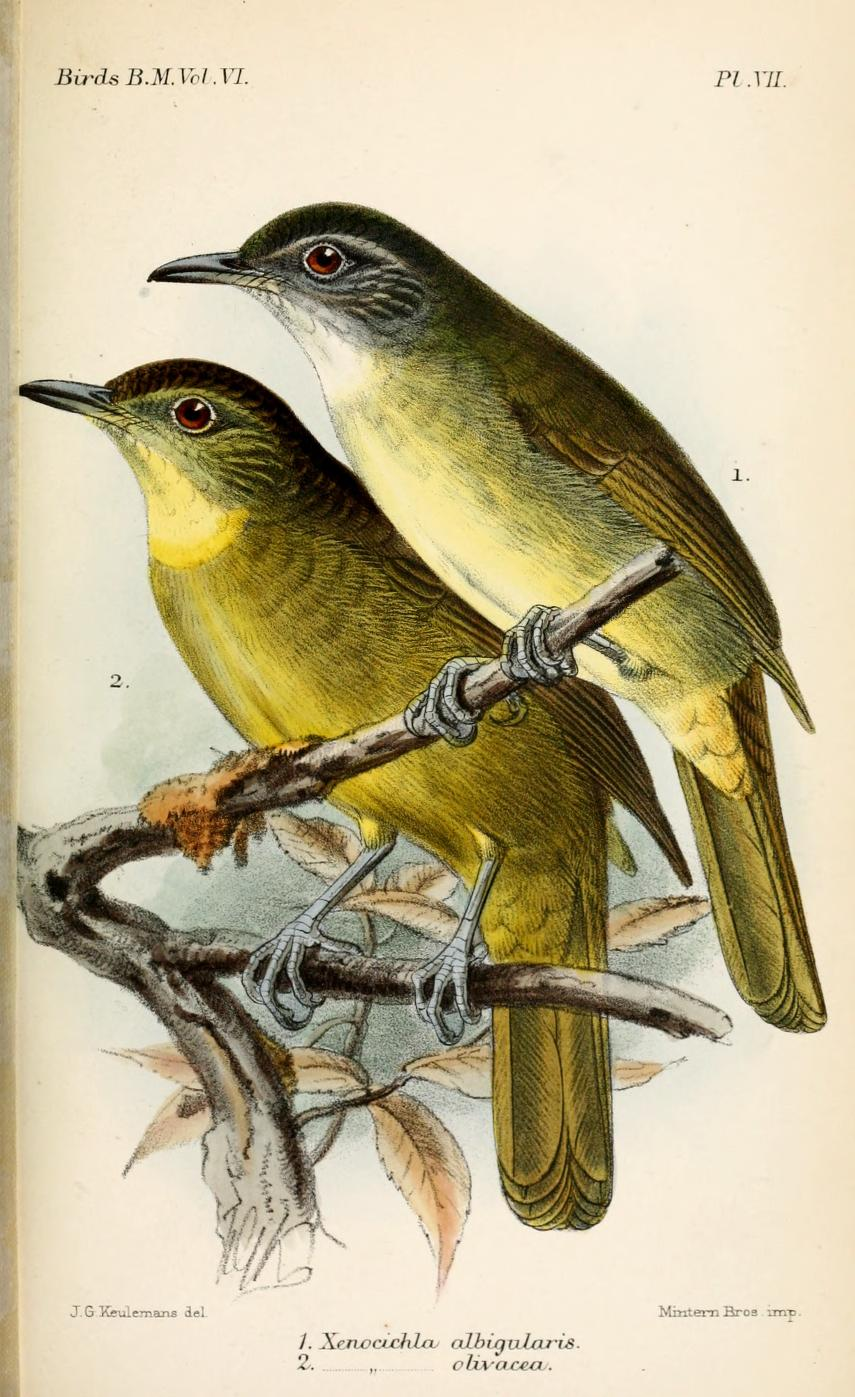
- White-bearded greenbul (above) and yellow-bearded greenbul (below)

Scientific classification
- Kingdom: Animalia
- Phylum: Chordata
- Class: Aves
- Order: Passeriformes
- Family: Pycnonotidae
- Genus: Criniger; Temminck, 1820

Type species
- Criniger barbatus (Western bearded greenbul) Temminck, 1821
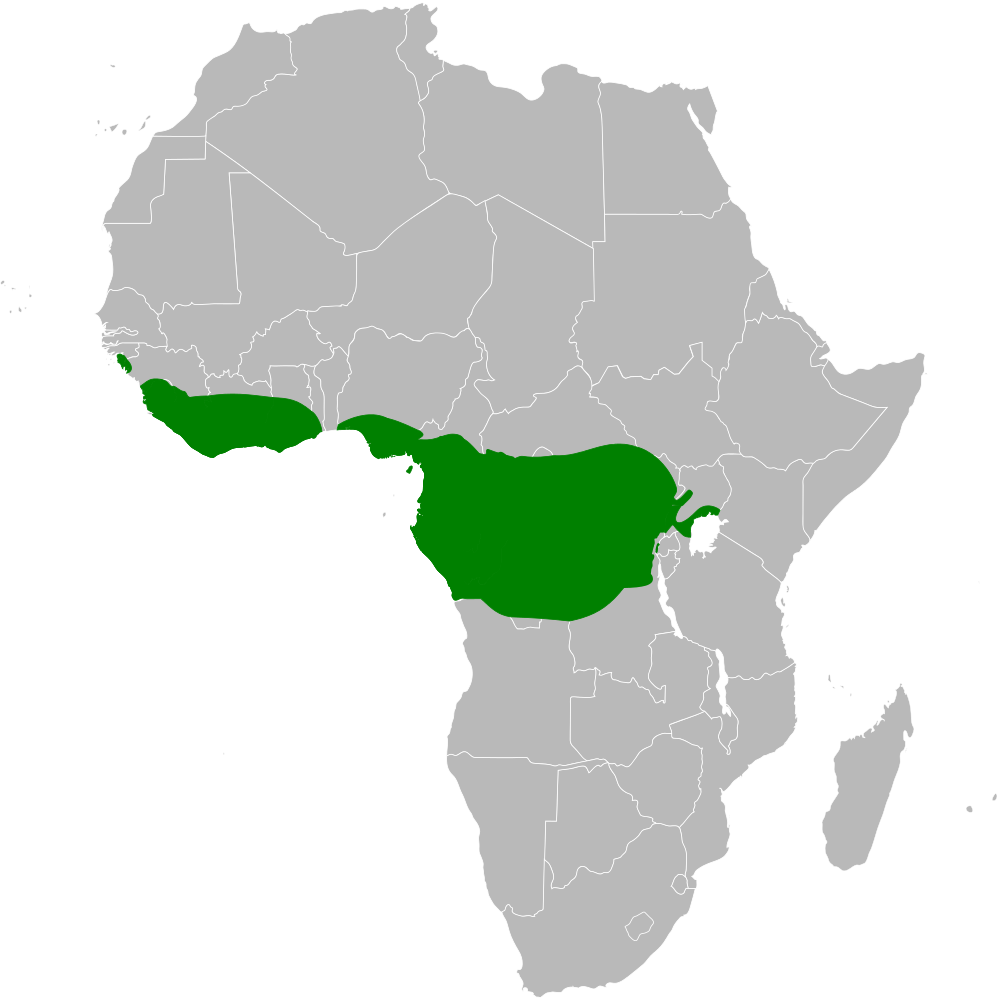

Synonyms
- Trichophorus; Tricophorus

= Criniger =

Genus of birds

Criniger is a genus of songbirds in the bulbul family, Pycnonotidae. The species of Criniger are found in western and central Africa.

== Taxonomy ==
The genus Criniger was introduced in 1820 by the Dutch zoologist Coenraad Jacob Temminck, the name Criniger is Latin for "long-haired" (from crinis, meaning "hair" and gerere, meaning "to carry"). A year later Temminck designated the type species as the western bearded greenbul.

=== Species ===
The genus contains five species:

Image	Scientific name	Common name	Distribution
	Western bearded greenbul	Criniger barbatus	Guinean Forests of West Africa
	Eastern bearded greenbul	Criniger chloronotus	Congolian rainforests
	Red-tailed greenbul	Criniger calurus	African tropical rainforest
	White-bearded greenbul	Criniger ndussumensis	Congolian rainforests
	Yellow-bearded greenbul	Criniger olivaceus	Upper Guinean forests

=== Former species ===
Formerly, some authorities also considered the following species (or subspecies) as species within the genus Criniger:

- Striated bulbul (as Tricophorus striatus or Criniger striatus)
- Streak-eared bulbul (as Criniger Conradi)
- Western greenbul (as Trichophorus tephrolaemus)
- Olive-headed greenbul (as Criniger olivaceiceps)
- Golden greenbul (as Criniger serinus)
- Honeyguide greenbul (as Criniger indicator)
- Upper Guinea honeyguide greenbul (as Trichophorus leucurus)
- Yellow-bellied greenbul (as Trichophorus flaviventris)
- Falkenstein's greenbul (as Criniger Falkensteini)
- Simple greenbul (as Trichophorus simplex)
- Yellow-throated leaflove (as Trichophorus flavicollis or Criniger flavicollis)
- Uganda yellow-throated greenbul (as Trichophorus flavigula)
- Northern brownbul (as Criniger strepitans)
- Fischer's greenbul (as Criniger Fischeri)
- Cabanis's greenbul (as Criniger cabanisi)
- Icterine greenbul (as Trichophorus icterinus)
- Red-tailed bristlebill (multicolor) (as Criniger multicolor)
- Green-tailed bristlebill (as Trichophorus eximius)
- Yellow-lored bristlebill (as Trichophorus notatus)
- Grey-headed bristlebill (as Trichophorus canicapillus)
- Finsch's bulbul (as Criniger finschi)
- White-throated bulbul (as Trichophorus flaveolus or Criniger flaveolus)
- White-throated bulbul (burmanicus) (as Criniger burmanicus)
- Puff-throated bulbul (as Criniger pallidus)
- Grey-crowned bulbul (as Criniger griseiceps)
- Puff-throated bulbul (henrici) (as Criniger Henrici)
- Ochraceous bulbul (as Criniger ochraceus)
- Ochraceous bulbul (sordidus) (as Criniger sordidus)
- Ochraceous bulbul (sumatranus) (as Criniger sumatranus)
- Ochraceous bulbul (ruficrissus) (as Criniger ruficrissus)
- Grey-cheeked bulbul (as Criniger bres)
- Grey-cheeked bulbul (tephrogenys) (as Trichophorus tephrogenys)
- Grey-cheeked bulbul (gutturalis) (as Trichophorus gutturalis or Criniger gutturalis)
- Palawan bulbul (as Criniger frater)
- Yellow-bellied bulbul (as Criniger phaeocephalus)
- Yellow-bellied bulbul (diardi) (as Criniger diardi)
- Yellow-bellied bulbul (sulphuratus) (as Trichophorus sulphuratus)
- Yellow-browed bulbul (as Trichophorus indicus)
- Yellow-browed bulbul (icterica) (as Criniger ictericus)
- Hairy-backed bulbul (as Trichophorus minutus)
- Hairy-backed bulbul (sericeus) (as Criniger sericea)
- Grey-eyed bulbul (as Criniger propinquus)
- Charlotte's bulbul (as Criniger charlottae)
- Sulphur-bellied bulbul (as Criniger palawanensis)
- Seram golden bulbul (as Criniger affinis)
- Ambon golden bulbul (as Trichophorus flavicaudus)
- Northern golden bulbul (as Criniger longirostris)
- Sangihe golden bulbul (as Criniger Platenae)
- Togian golden bulbul (as Criniger aureus)
- Halmahera golden bulbul (as Criniger Chloris)
- Buru golden bulbul (as Criniger mystacalis)
- Yellowish bulbul (as Criniger Everetti)
- Sulu bulbul (as Criniger Haynaldi)
