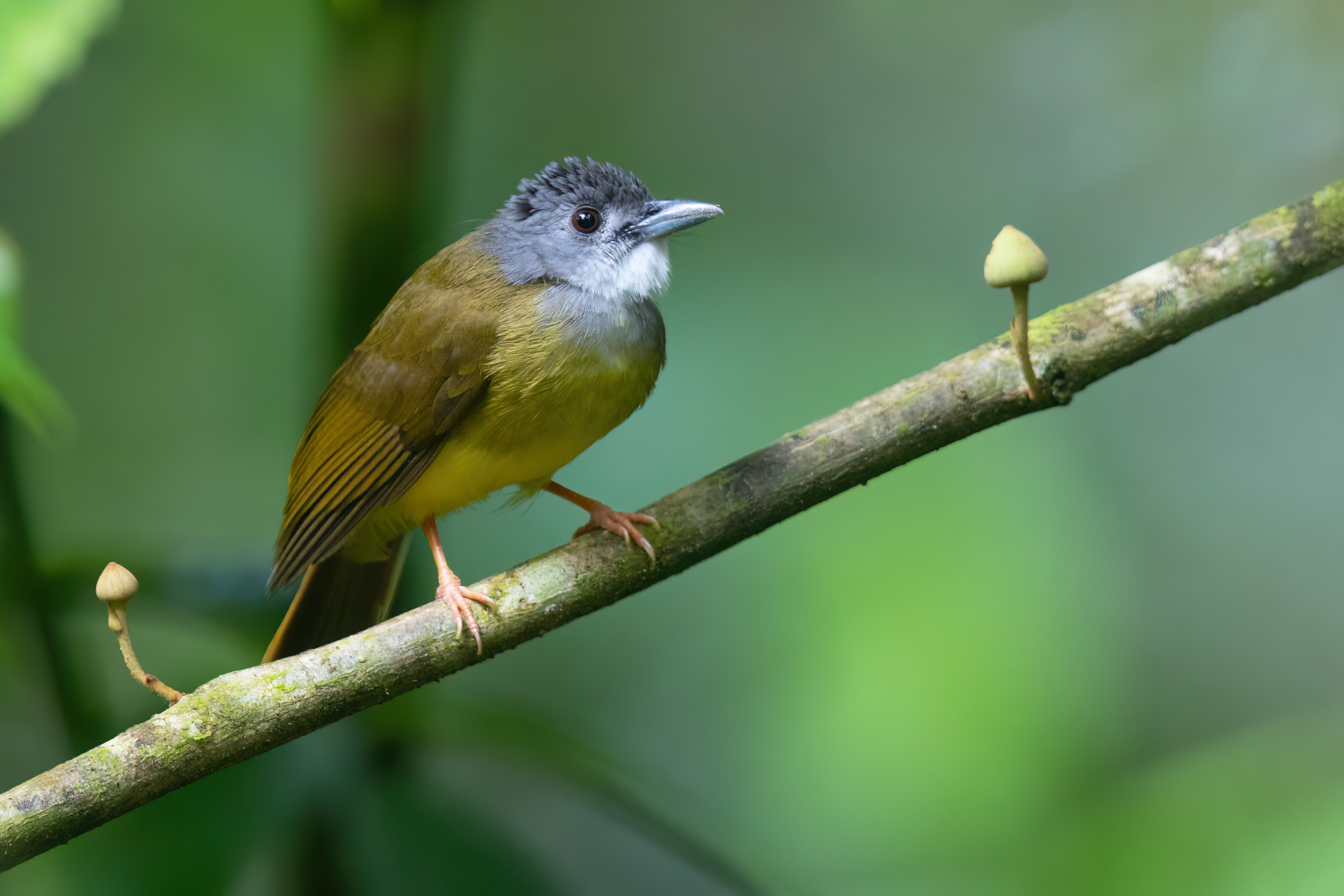
- In Sabah, Malaysia

Conservation status
- Least Concern (IUCN 3.1)

Scientific classification
- Kingdom: Animalia
- Phylum: Chordata
- Class: Aves
- Order: Passeriformes
- Family: Pycnonotidae
- Genus: Alophoixus
- Species: A. phaeocephalus

Binomial name
- Alophoixus phaeocephalus (Hartlaub, 1844)
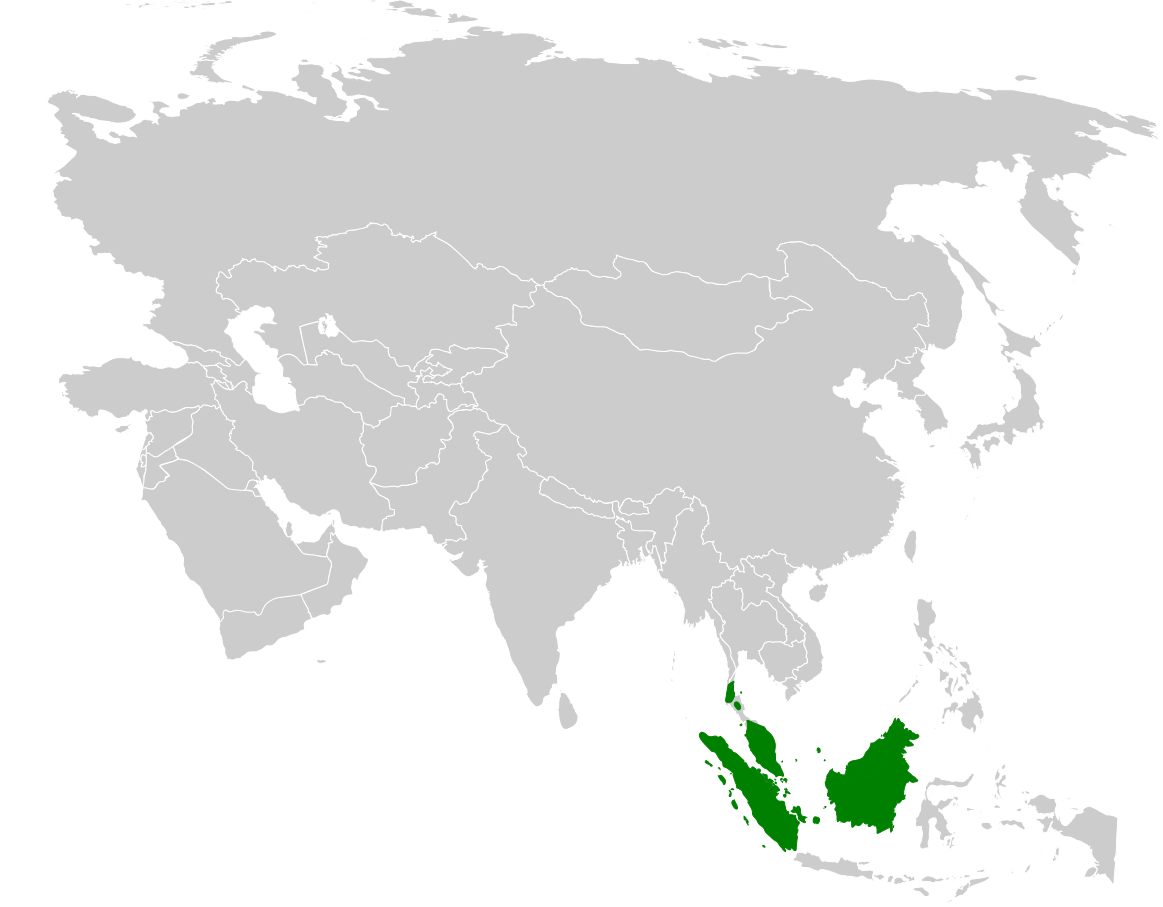

Synonyms
- Criniger phaeocephalus; Ixos phaeocephalus; Trichixos phaeocephalus

= Yellow-bellied bulbul =

Species of songbird

The yellow-bellied bulbul (Alophoixus phaeocephalus) is a species of songbird in the bulbul family, Pycnonotidae. It is found on the Malay Peninsula, Sumatra and Borneo. Its natural habitat is subtropical or tropical moist lowland forests.

== Taxonomy and systematics ==
The yellow-bellied bulbul was originally described in the genus Ixos and alternatively classified in the now defunct genus Trichixos. It was later placed in the genus Criniger until moved to the genus Alophoixus in 2009. Alternate names for the yellow-bellied bulbul include the crestless white-throated bulbul, grey-capped bulbul, grey-headed bearded bulbul, grey-headed bulbul, white-throated bulbul and yellow-bellied bearded-bulbul. The common name 'yellow-bellied bulbul' is also used as an alternate name for the yellow-bellied greenbul. The alternate name 'grey-headed bulbul' should not be confused with the species of the same name, Pycnonotus priocephalus. The common name 'yellow-bellied bulbul' is also used as an alternate name for the white-throated bulbul. The alternate name 'white-throated bulbul' should not be confused with the species of the same name, Alophoixus flaveolus.

=== Subspecies ===
Four subspecies are recognized:

- A. p. phaeocephalus - (Hartlaub, 1844): Found on the Malay Peninsula and Sumatra
- A. p. connectens - Chasen & Kloss, 1929: Found in north-eastern Borneo
- A. p. diardi - (Finsch, 1867): Originally described as a separate species in the genus Criniger. Found in western Borneo
- A. p. sulphuratus - (Bonaparte, 1850): Originally described as a separate species in the genus Trichophorus (a synonym for Criniger). Found in central Borneo
