= John Charles Phillips =

American zoologist (1876–1938)

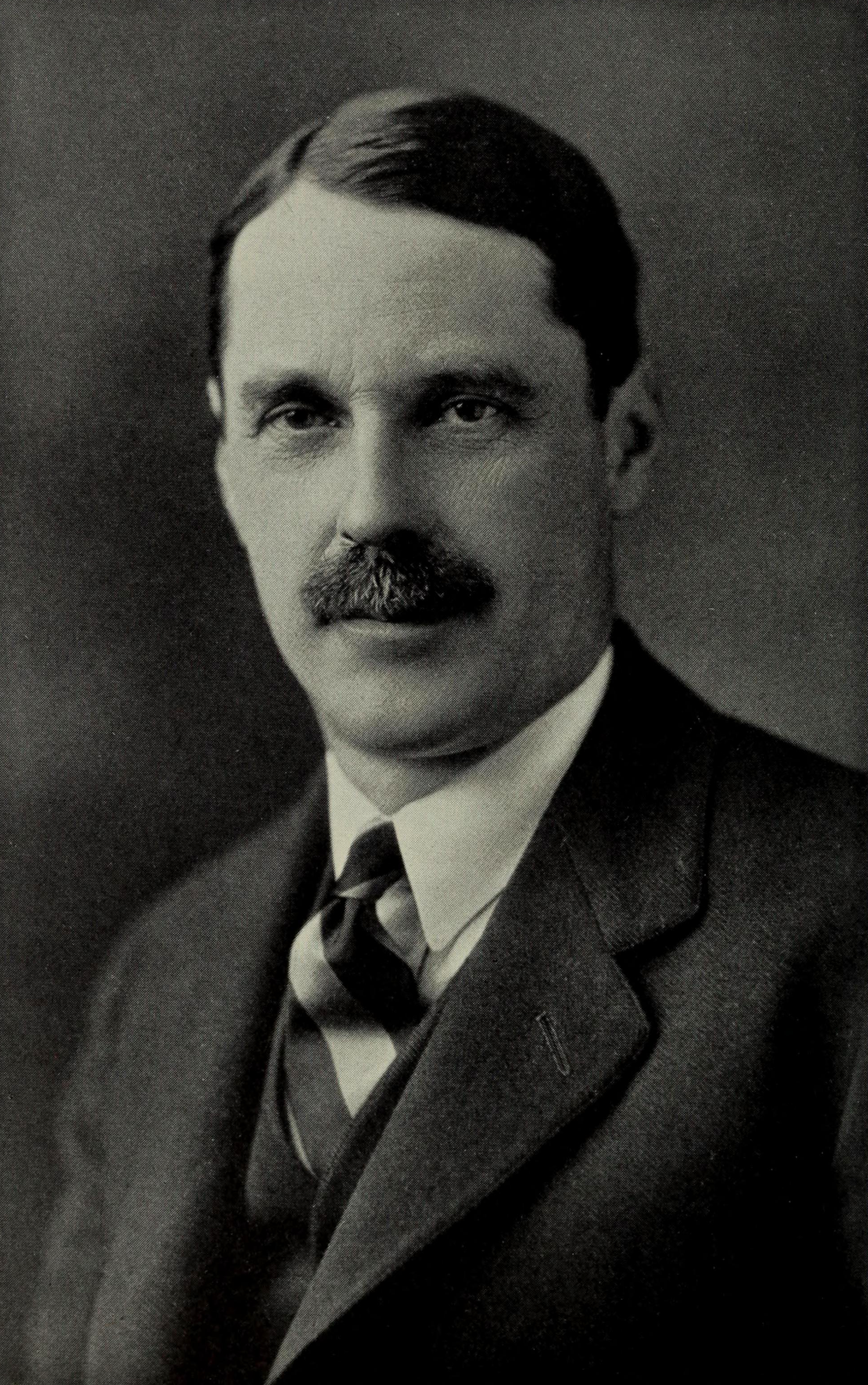
- Born: John Charles Phillips III; November 5, 1876; Boston, Massachusetts
- Died: November 14, 1939 (aged 63); Near Exeter, New Hampshire
- Spouse: Eleanor Hyde (m. 1908)
- Scientific career
- Fields: Zoology; Ornithology; Environmentalism
- Education: Milton Academy; Lawrence Scientific School, S.B. (1899); Harvard Medical School M.D. (1904)
- Relatives: John Phillips (great-grandfather); Wendell Phillips (grand-uncle)

Signature
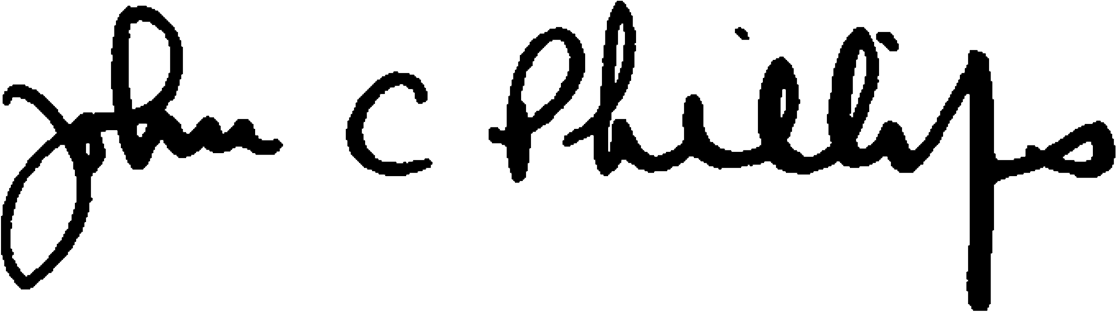

John Charles Phillips (November 5, 1876 – November 14, 1938) was an American hunter, zoologist, ornithologist, and environmentalist. He published over two hundred books and articles about animal breeding, sport hunting, ornithology, wildlife conservation, faunal surveys and systematic reviews, and Mendelian genetics.

== Life and work ==
Phillips was born November 5, 1876, in Boston, Massachusetts. His father was businessman John Charles Phillips Jr. (1838-1885), who married Anna Tucker in London, England, on October 23, 1874. Phillips was the great-grandson of John Phillips (1770-1823), the first mayor of Boston, and the grand-nephew of abolitionist Wendell Phillips (1811-1884).

Phillips prepared for college at Milton Academy and graduated from the Lawrence Scientific School of Harvard University in 1899 with a Bachelor of Science. He continued his education while he attended Harvard Medical School, which he graduated from in 1904 with a Doctor of Medicine. After graduating he began his two-year post as a physician at the Boston City Hospital, but never practiced medicine professionally.

Phillips married Eleanor Hyde on January 11, 1908, and had four children, John Charles, Madelyn Eleanor, and Arthur.

During the First World War, Phillips joined the Second Harvard Surgical Corp and was assigned to General Hospital No. 2 of the British Expeditionary Force in 1915. After his service, he returned home. When the United States was drawn into World War I, he joined the Medical Corps of the U.S. forces as first lieutenant. In 1918 he was promoted to Major. He was part of three important battles in France and part of the army that led to the occupation of Germany. In July 1919, after twenty-six months at war, he returned to the United States.

On November 14, 1938, Phillips was grouse hunting with a friend in southern New Hampshire (near Exeter) where he suffered heart failure and died.

== Zoologist, hunter and environmentalist ==
At a young age Phillips had developed a great interest in nature, hunting, fishing and kayaking. Through these hobbies he learned self-travel, an experience which later helped him with distant excursions. In 1915 he published his self-financed Boy Journals, 1887-1892, a work on his most important experiences from his youth.

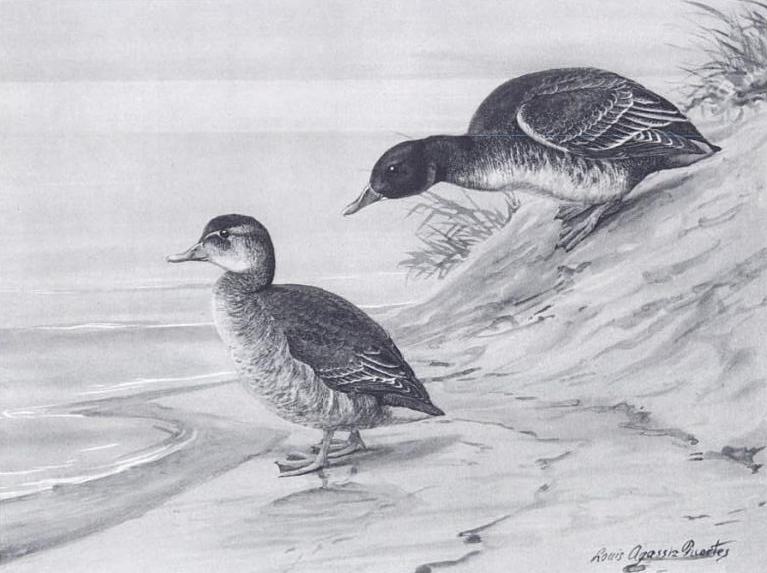
Painting of black-headed ducks by Louis Agassiz Fuertes, from A Natural History of the Ducks by John Charles Phillips.

Phillips took various short journeys throughout the West of the United States and Canada. In 1900 he published the first two short article about his hunting experiences at Wenham Lake, as well as bighorn sheep (Ovis canadensis) in Wyoming. The area of the Glacier National Park fascinated him even before the time it was put under protection. Many of the geographical features today bear the name which he had assigned to them. In 1896 he accompanied Robert Edwin Peary (1856-1920) on his Greenland expeditions. Ten years later, he and his friend Theodore Lyman (1874-1954) visited Japan and its colony Chōsen with a foray into the south of China to hunt tigers. Further excursions, which he undertook together with Glover Morrill Allen (1879-1942), were in the valley of the Blue Nile and the border of Ethiopia between 1912 and 1913, as well as the Sinai Peninsula and Palestine in 1914. He brought important bird and mammal collections back from both, which were handed over to the Louis Agassiz Museum of Comparative Zoology. In 1938, he visited Cuba and Florida with Thomas Barbour (1884-1946). His last long journey took him to Kenya via Uganda and the east of the Belgian Congo with his wife and son John in the years 1923–1924 to hunt African game in its natural habitat.

In 1932, he published a list of his publications, which at the time contained 169 titles. Later, another 35 publications were added. While the first publications were marked by hunting and outdoor observations, he later shifted his interest to studies on genetic issues in wild animals, as well as species protection and environmentalism.

== Taxa described ==
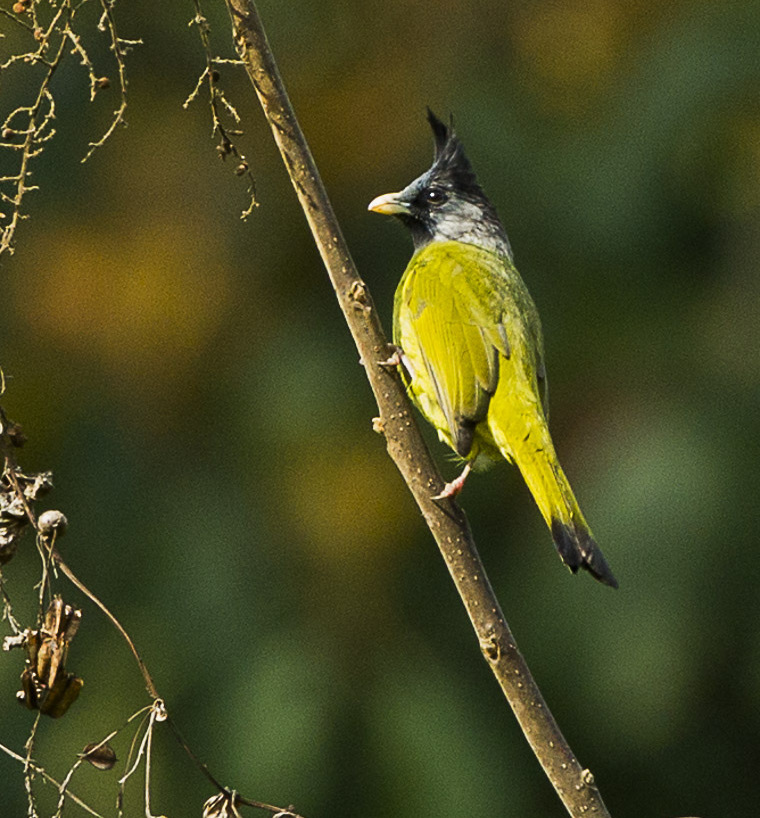
Crested finchbill

Philips described numerous species and subspecies which were new to science. In chronological order:

- Mottled owl (Ciccaba virgata tamaulipensis Phillips, JC, 1911)
- Spectacled barwing (Actinodura ramsayi yunnanensis Bangs & Phillips, JC, 1914)
- Crested finchbill (Spizixos canifrons ingrami Bangs & Phillips, JC, 1914)
- Spotted forktail (Enicurus maculatus bacatus Bangs & Phillips, JC, 1914)
- Long-tailed minivet (Pericrocotus ethologus Bangs & Phillips, JC, 1914)
- Long-tailed minivet (Pericrocotus ethologus favillaceus Bangs & Phillips, JC, 1914)
- Rufous-bellied niltava (Niltava sundara denotata Bangs & Phillips, JC, 1914)
- Streak-breasted scimitar babbler (Pomatorhinus ruficollis reconditus Bangs & Phillips, JC, 1914)
- Rufous-throated partridge (Arborophila rufogularis euroa ( Bangs & Phillips, JC, 1914))
- Black-streaked scimitar babbler (Pomatorhinus gravivox odicus Bangs & Phillips, JC, 1914)
- Striated bulbul (Pycnonotus striatus paulus (Bangs & Phillips, JC, 1914))
- Kelp goose (Chloephaga hybrida malvinarum Phillips, JC, 1916)

== Eponyms ==
Taxa named in honor of John Charles Phillips:

- Blesbok (Damaliscus pygargus phillipsi Harper, 1939)
- Phillips' mole viper (Atractaspis phillipsi Barbour, 1913)

== Selected publications ==
- "After Sheep in Wyoming", Forest and Stream 54: p. 247, 1900. Retrieved 2016-01-31
- "Notes on the Autumn Migration of the Canada Goose in Eastern Massachusetts", The Auk 27 (3): pp. 263–271, 1910. Retrieved 2016-01-31
- "A Years' Collecting in the State of Tamaulipas, Mexico", The Auk 28 (1): pp. 67–89, 1911. Retrieved 2016-01-31
- "On germinal transplantation in vertebrates", Carnegie institution of Washington. Retrieved 2016-01-31
- "A new puma from Lower California", Proceedings of the Biological Society of Washington 25: pp. 85–86, 1912. Retrieved 2016-01-31
- "Further experiments on ovarian transplantation in guinea pigs" (in German), Science 38 (7): pp. 783–786, 1913 Retrieved 2016-01-31
- "Reciprocal Crosses between Reeves's Pheasant and the Common Ring-Neck Pheasant Producing Unlike Hybrids", The American Naturalist 47 (563): pp. 701–704, 1913 Retrieved 2016-01-31
- "A Cross Involving Four Pairs of Mendelian Characters in Mice", The American Naturalist 47 (564): pp. 760–762 Retrieved 2016-01-31
- "Piebald rats and selection; an experimental test of the effectiveness of selection and of the theory of gametic purity in Mendelian crosses", Carnegie institution of Washington. Retrieved 2016-01-31
- "A further study of size inheritance in ducks with observations on the sex ratio of hybrid birds", Journal of Experimental Zoology 16 (1): pp. 131–148, 1914 Retrieved 2016-01-31
- "Notes on a collection of birds from Yunnan", Bulletin of the Museum of Comparative Zoology at Harvard College 58 (6): pp. 267–302. Retrieved 2016-01-31
- "A new race of Pelzelns Weaver-Finch", Occasional papers of the Boston Society of Natural History 5: p. 177. Retrieved 2016-01-31
- "A natural history of the ducks". Boston, Houghton Mifflin Company. Vol. I, 1922. Vol. II, 1923. Vol. III, 1925. Vol. IV, 1926. Retrieved 2016-01-31
- "Conservation of our mammals and birds in Hunting and Conservation", the Book of the Boone and Crockett Club, New Haven, CT: Yale University Press, pp. 29–65
- "Wenham Great Pond", Salem, Massachusetts: Peabody Museum, 1938
