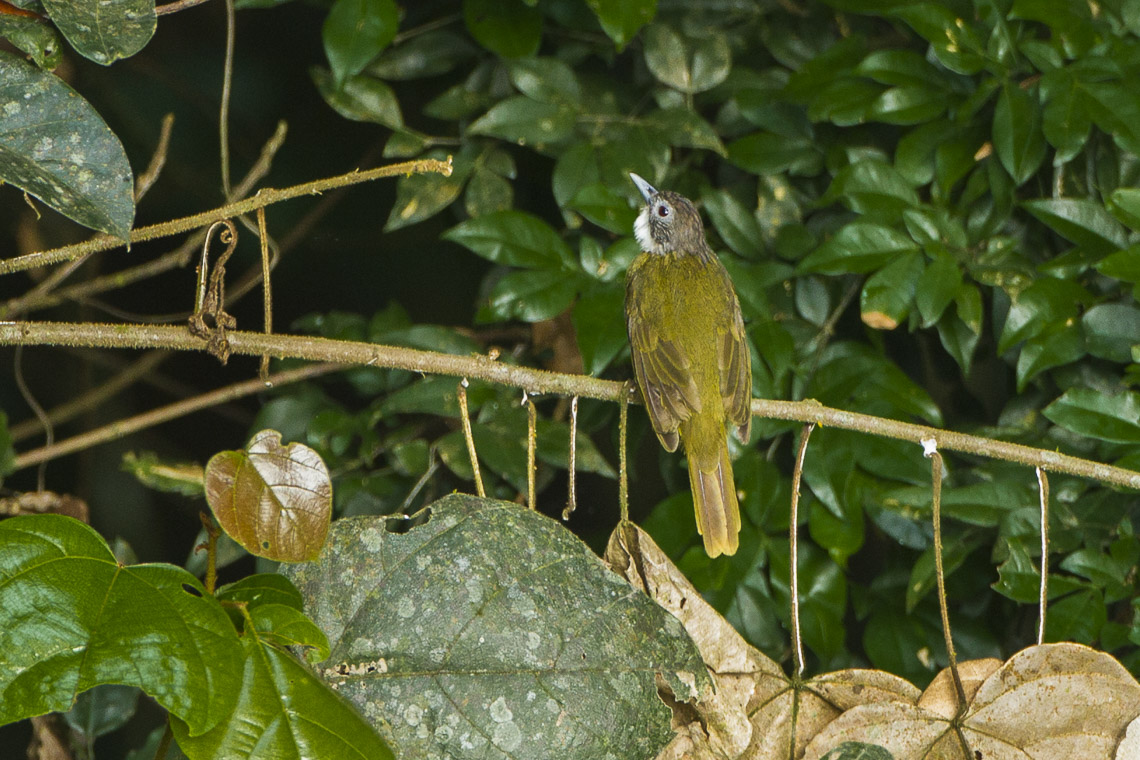
- In Kakum NP, Ghana

Conservation status
- Least Concern (IUCN 3.1)

Scientific classification
- Kingdom: Animalia
- Phylum: Chordata
- Class: Aves
- Order: Passeriformes
- Family: Pycnonotidae
- Genus: Criniger
- Species: C. calurus

Binomial name
- Criniger calurus (Cassin, 1856)
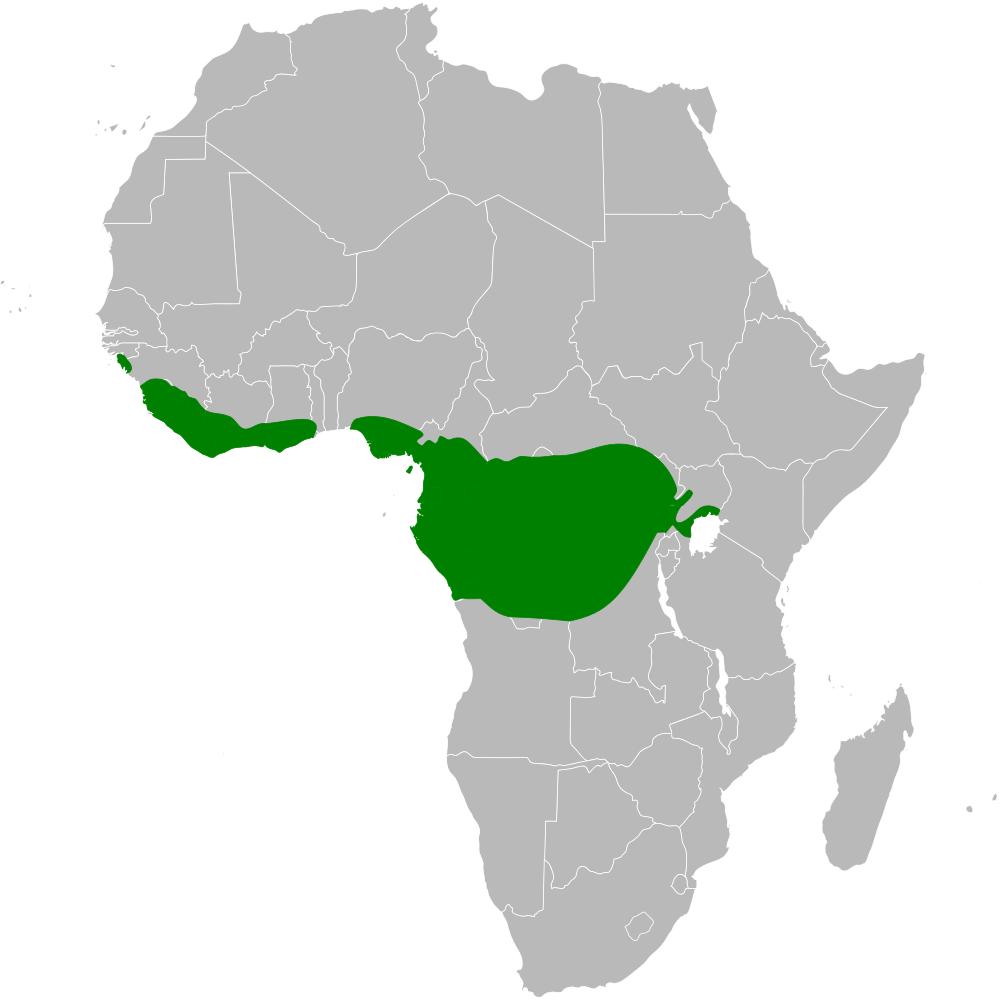

Synonyms
- Criniger swainsoni; Criniger verreauxi; Trichophorus calurus

= Red-tailed greenbul =

Species of songbird

The red-tailed greenbul (Criniger calurus), also known as the red-tailed bulbul, is a species of songbird in the bulbul family, Pycnonotidae, native to the African tropical rainforest.

== Taxonomy and systematics ==
Alternate names for the red-tailed greenbul include the red-tailed bearded bulbul, red-tailed bulbul and thick-billed red-tailed greenbul.

=== Subspecies ===
Three subspecies are recognized. Additionally, the white-bearded greenbul was also originally described as a subspecies of the red-tailed greenbul:

- Gold Coast red-tailed bulbul (C. c. verreauxi) - Sharpe, 1871: Originally described as a separate species and alternatively named as the Sierra Leone red-tailed bulbul. Found from Senegal to south-western Nigeria
- C. c. calurus - (Cassin, 1856): Found from southern Nigeria to western Democratic Republic of Congo
- C. c. emini - Chapin, 1948: Found from north-eastern Angola and western Democratic Republic of Congo to Uganda and western Tanzania
