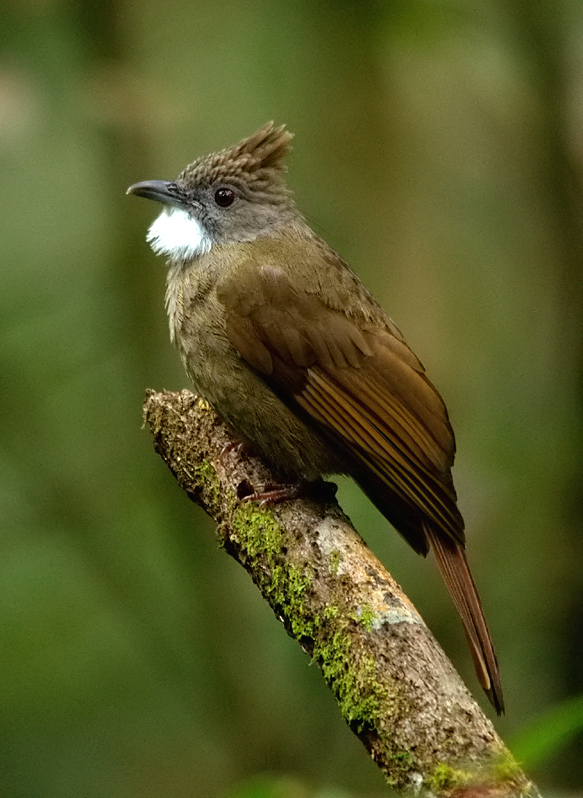
- In Kinabalu Park, Malaysia

Conservation status
- Least Concern (IUCN 3.1)

Scientific classification
- Kingdom: Animalia
- Phylum: Chordata
- Class: Aves
- Order: Passeriformes
- Family: Pycnonotidae
- Genus: Alophoixus
- Species: A. ochraceus

Binomial name
- Alophoixus ochraceus (Moore, F, 1854)

Synonyms
- Criniger ochraceus

= Ochraceous bulbul =

Species of songbird

The ochraceous bulbul (Alophoixus ochraceus) is a species of songbird in the bulbul family, Pycnonotidae. It is found from Southeast Asia to Sumatra. It is usually found in the mid-storey of broad-leaved evergreen and rainforests up to 1500 metres elevation.

== Taxonomy and systematics ==
The ochraceous bulbul was originally described in the genus Criniger until moved to the genus Alophoixus in 2009. Alternate names for the ochraceous bulbul include the brown white-throated bulbul and ochraceous bearded-bulbul.

=== Subspecies ===
Six subspecies are recognized:

- A. o. hallae - (Deignan, 1956): Found in southern Vietnam
- A. o. cambodianus - (Delacour & Jabouille, 1928): Found in eastern Thailand and south-western Cambodia
- A. o. ochraceus - (Moore, F, 1854): Found in southern Myanmar and south-western Thailand
- A. o. sordidus - (Richmond, 1900): Originally described as a separate species in the genus Criniger. Found on central Malay Peninsula
- A. o. sacculatus - (Robinson, 1915): Found on southern Malay Peninsula
- A. o. sumatranus - (Wardlaw-Ramsay, RG, 1882): Originally described as a separate species in the genus Criniger. Found in western Sumatra

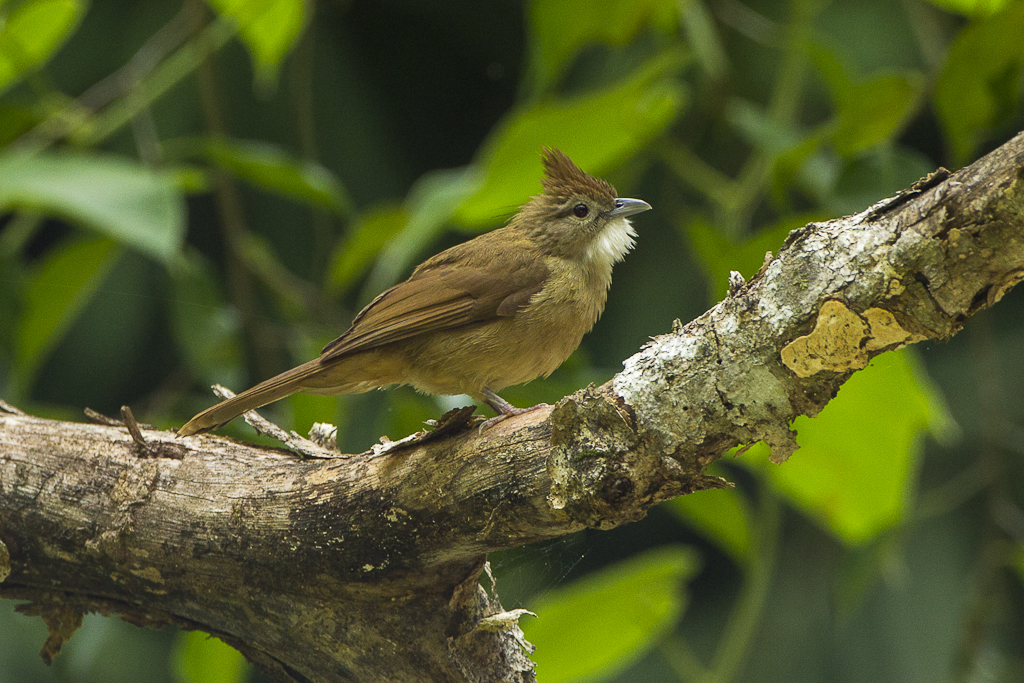
