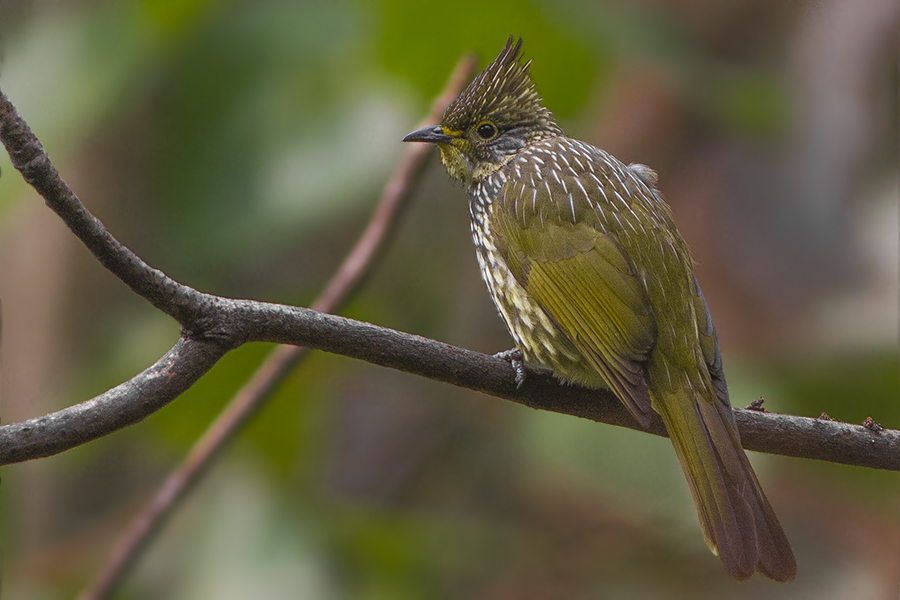
- In Khangchendzonga National Park, Sikkim, India

Conservation status
- Least Concern (IUCN 3.1)

Scientific classification
- Kingdom: Animalia
- Phylum: Chordata
- Class: Aves
- Order: Passeriformes
- Family: Pycnonotidae
- Genus: Alcurus; Blyth, 1843
- Species: A. striatus

Binomial name
- Alcurus striatus (Blyth, 1842)
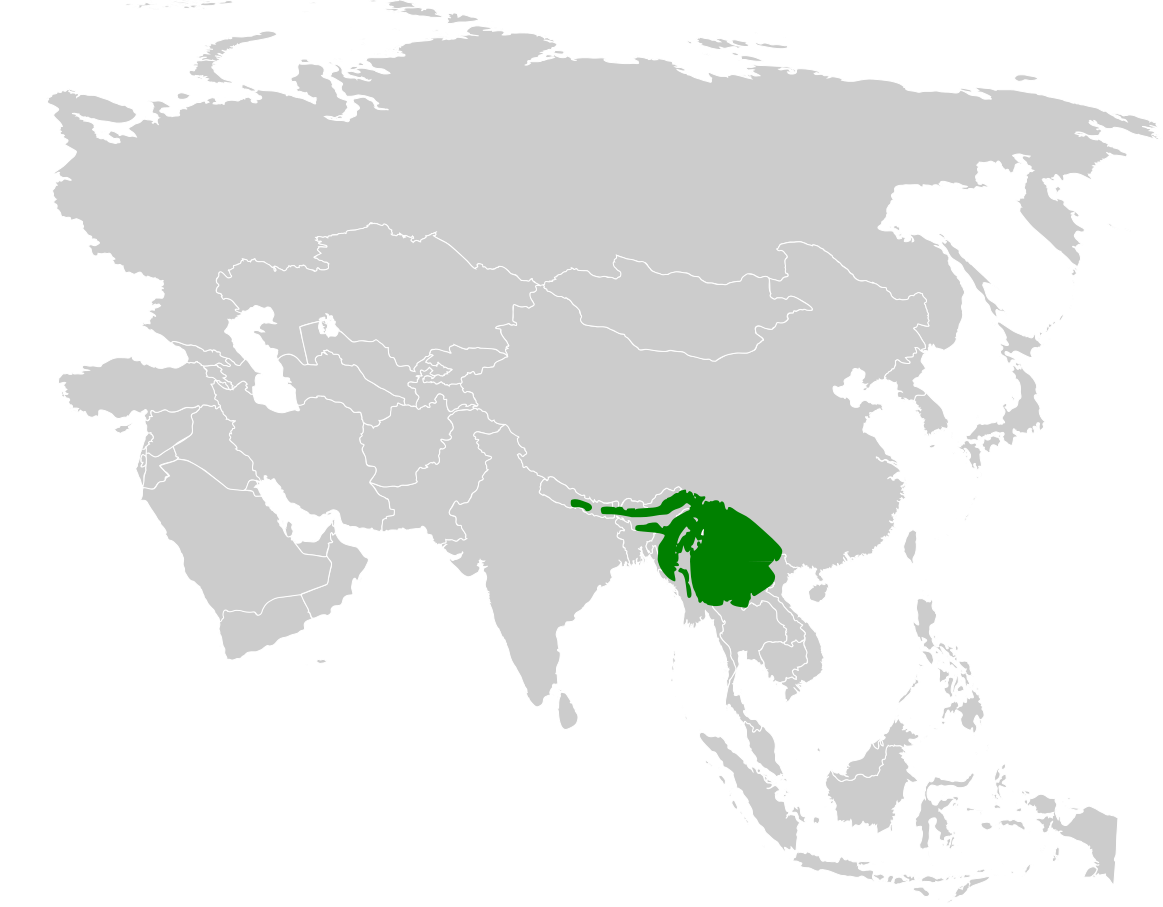

Synonyms
- Alcurus nipalensis; Pycnonotus striatus; Criniger striatus; Tricophorus striatus

= Striated bulbul =

Species of songbird

The striated bulbul (Alcurus striatus) is a species of songbird in the bulbul family, Pycnonotidae. It is the only species placed in the genus Alcurus .

It is found from the eastern Himalayas to northern Vietnam. Its natural habitat is subtropical or tropical moist montane forests.

== Taxonomy and systematics ==
The striated bulbul was originally described in the genus Tricophorus (a synonym for Criniger) and it was later transferred to Pycnonotus, before its latest reassignment. Alternate names for the striated bulbul include the striated green bulbul and striped bulbul.

=== Subspecies ===
Three subspecies are recognized:

- A. s. striatus (Blyth, 1842) – eastern Himalayas, north-eastern India, southern China and western Myanmar
- A. s. arctus (Ripley, 1948) – Mishmi Hills (north-eastern India)
- A. s. paulus Bangs & Phillips, JC, 1914 – eastern Myanmar, southern China and northern Indochina

== Gallery ==
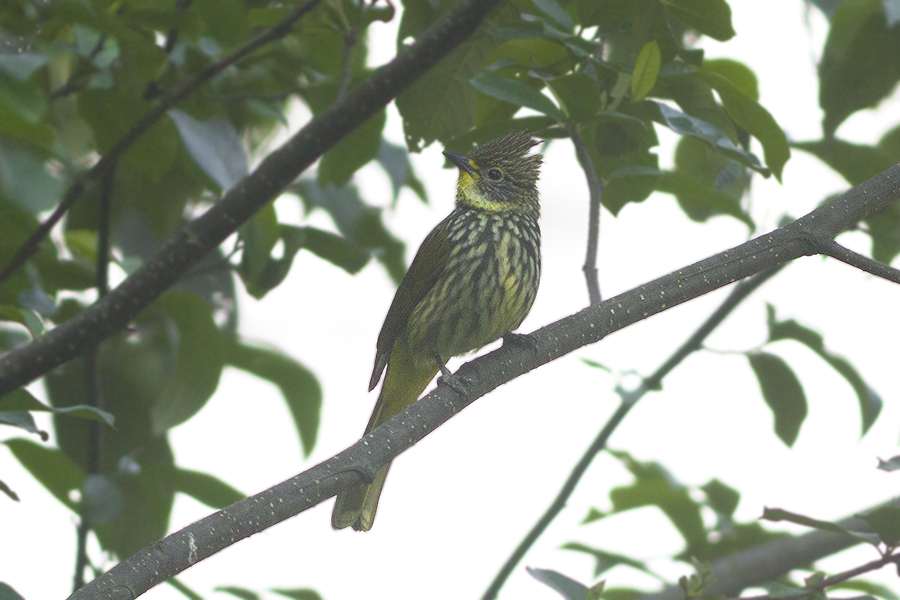
From Khangchendzonga National Park, East Sikkim, India

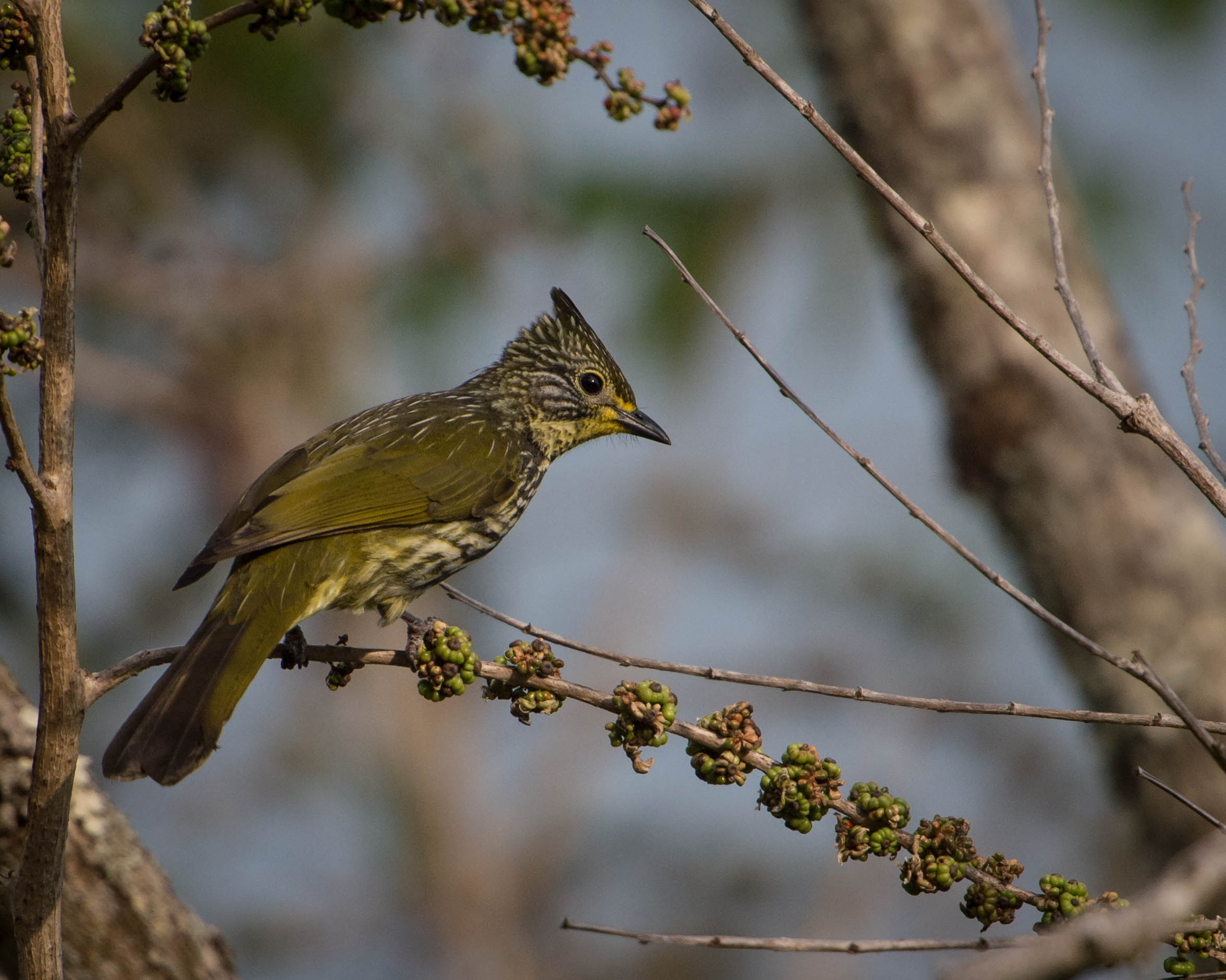
Striated bulbul (Alcurus striatus) at Thai/Myanmar Border. Doi Pha Hom Pok National Park, Chiang Mai, Thailand
