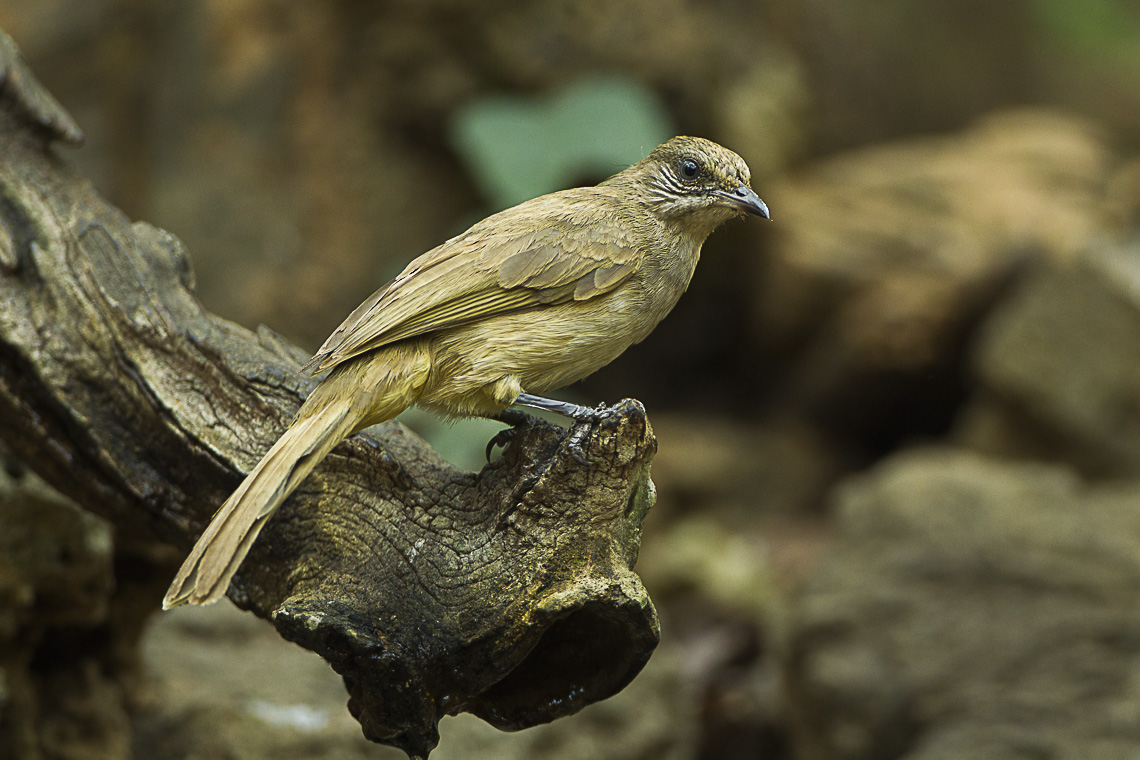
- Streak-eared bulbul (Pycnonotus conradi)

Scientific classification
- Kingdom: Animalia
- Phylum: Chordata
- Class: Aves
- Order: Passeriformes
- Family: Pycnonotidae
- Genus: Pycnonotus
- Species: P. conradi

Binomial name
- Pycnonotus conradi (Finsch, 1873)

Synonyms
- Criniger Conradi; Pycnonotus blanfordi conradi

= Streak-eared bulbul =

Species of bird

The streak-eared bulbul (Pycnonotus conradi) is a member of the bulbul family of passerine birds. It is found from Thailand and northern and central Malay Peninsula to southern Indochina. Its natural habitat is subtropical or tropical moist lowland forests.

The streak-eared bulbul was originally described in the genus Criniger. Until 2016, the streak-eared bulbul was considered to be conspecific with the Ayeyarwady bulbul while still using the name 'streak-eared bulbul' (as Pycnonotus blanfordi).

== Diet ==
It is a frugivore.
