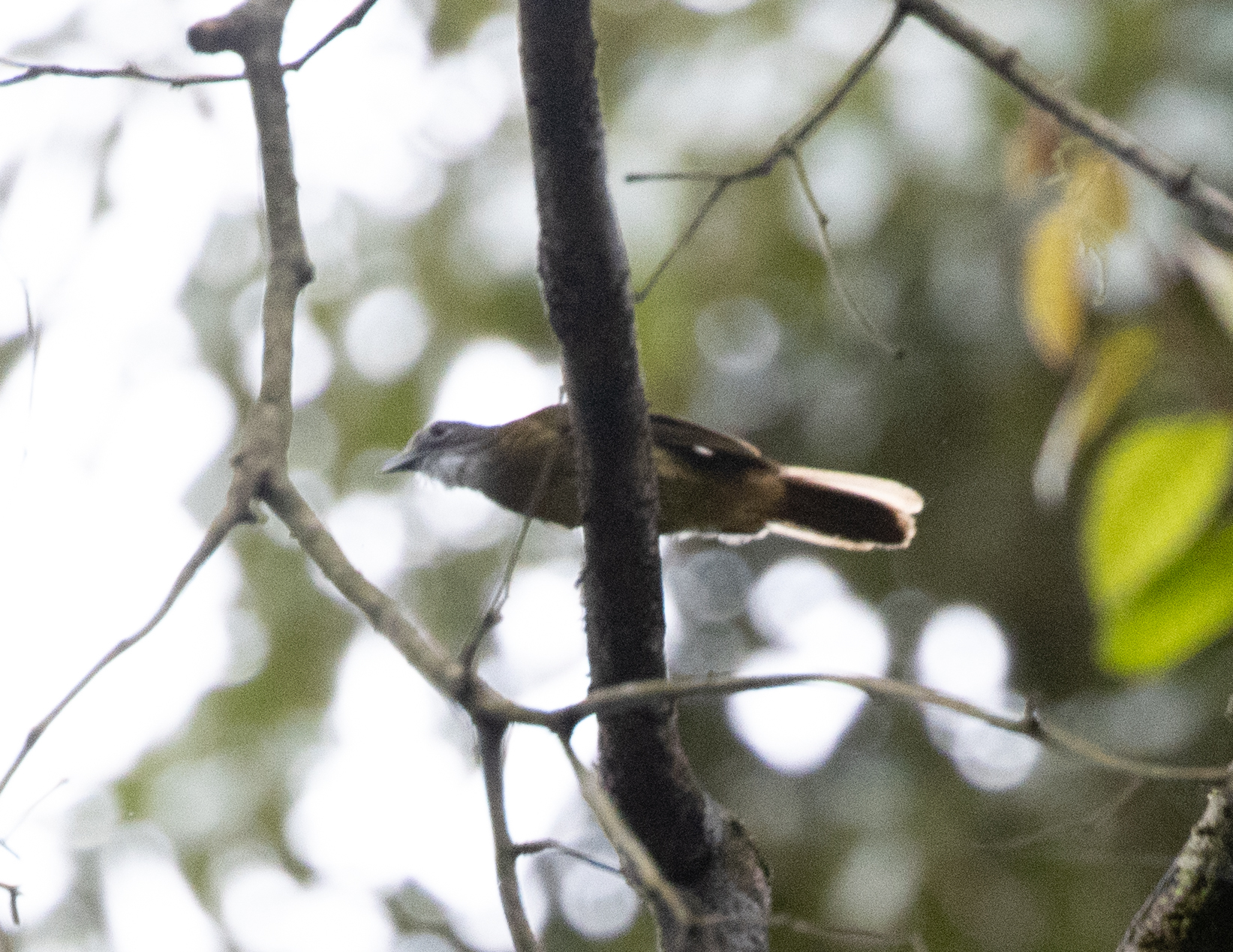

Conservation status
- Least Concern (IUCN 3.1)

Scientific classification
- Kingdom: Animalia
- Phylum: Chordata
- Class: Aves
- Order: Passeriformes
- Family: Pycnonotidae
- Genus: Criniger
- Species: C. ndussumensis

Binomial name
- Criniger ndussumensis Reichenow, 1904
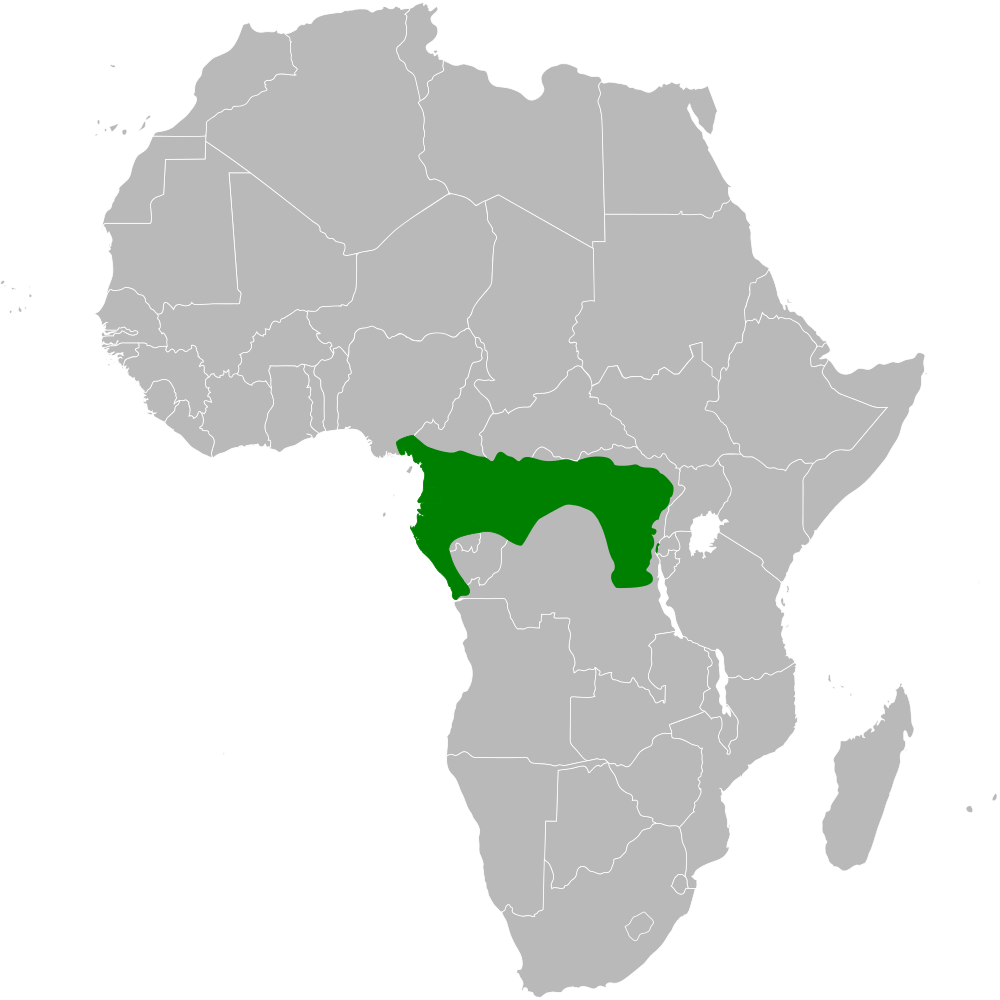

Synonyms
- Criniger verreauxi ndussumensis

= White-bearded greenbul =

Species of songbird

The white-bearded greenbul (Criniger ndussumensis), is a species of songbird in the bulbul family, Pycnonotidae. It is found from south-eastern Nigeria and western Cameroon to eastern Democratic Republic of the Congo and extreme north-western Angola. Its natural habitat is subtropical or tropical moist lowland forests.

== Taxonomy and systematics ==
The white-bearded greenbul was originally described as a subspecies of the red-tailed greenbul and alternatively has been considered as conspecific with the yellow-bearded greenbul. Alternate names for the white-bearded greenbul include the slender-billed bearded bulbul, Uganda red-tailed bulbul and white-bearded bulbul.
