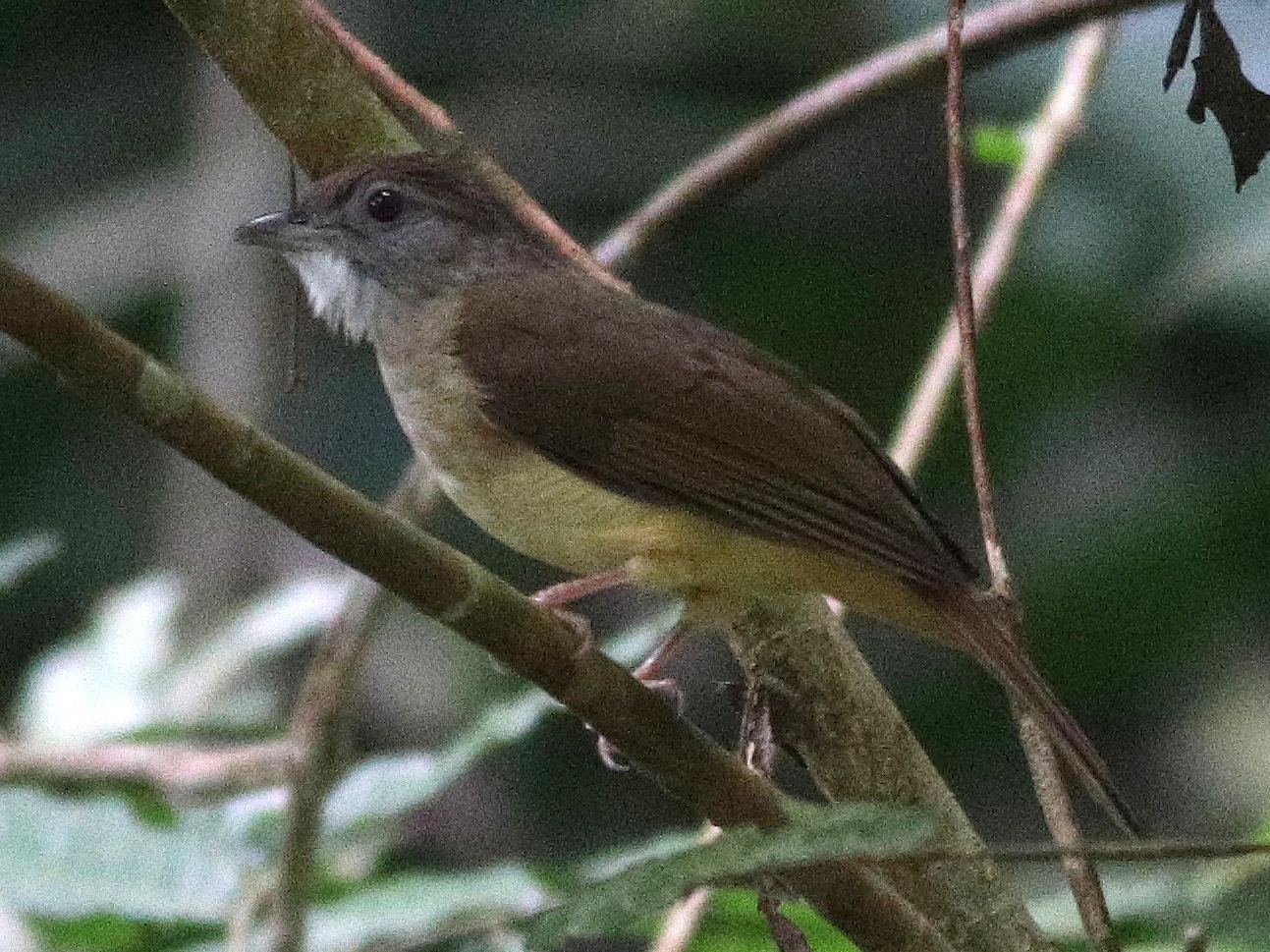

Conservation status
- Vulnerable (IUCN 3.1)

Scientific classification
- Kingdom: Animalia
- Phylum: Chordata
- Class: Aves
- Order: Passeriformes
- Family: Pycnonotidae
- Genus: Alophoixus
- Species: A. tephrogenys

Binomial name
- Alophoixus tephrogenys (Jardine & Selby, 1833)

= Grey-cheeked bulbul =

Species of bird

The grey-cheeked bulbul (Alophoixus tephrogenys) is a species of songbird in the bulbul family, Pycnonotidae. It is found from the Malay Peninsula to the Greater Sunda Islands. Its natural habitats are subtropical or tropical moist lowland forests and subtropical or tropical moist montane forests.

== Subspecies ==
Two subspecies are recognized.

- A. t. tephrogenys - (Jardine & Selby, 1833): Originally described as a separate species in the genus Trichophorus (a synonym for Criniger). Found on the Malay Peninsula and eastern Sumatra
- A. t. gutturalis - (Bonaparte, 1850): Originally described as a separate species in the genus Trichophorus. Found on Borneo
