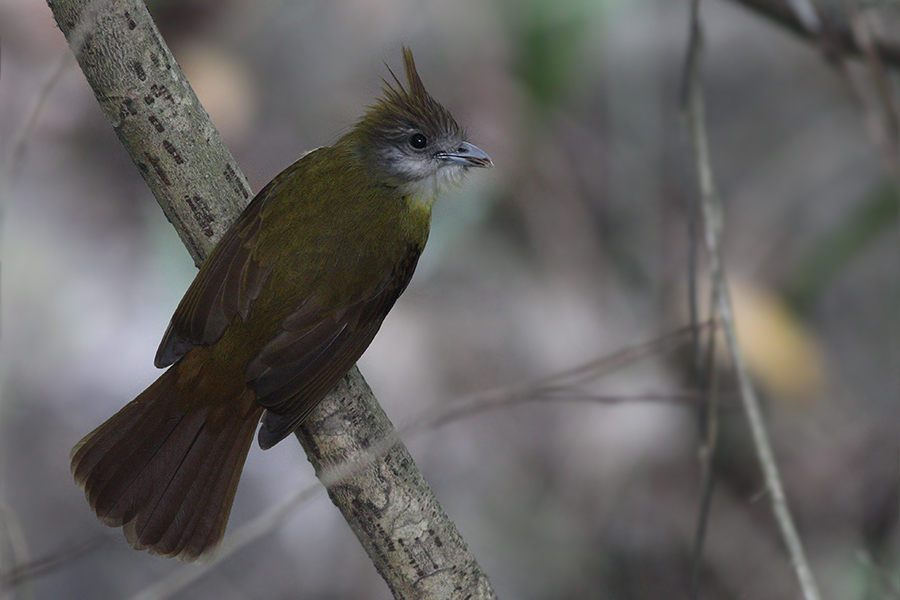
- From Eaglenest Wildlife Sanctuary, Arunachal Pradesh

Conservation status
- Least Concern (IUCN 3.1)

Scientific classification
- Kingdom: Animalia
- Phylum: Chordata
- Class: Aves
- Order: Passeriformes
- Family: Pycnonotidae
- Genus: Alophoixus
- Species: A. flaveolus

Binomial name
- Alophoixus flaveolus (Gould, 1836)
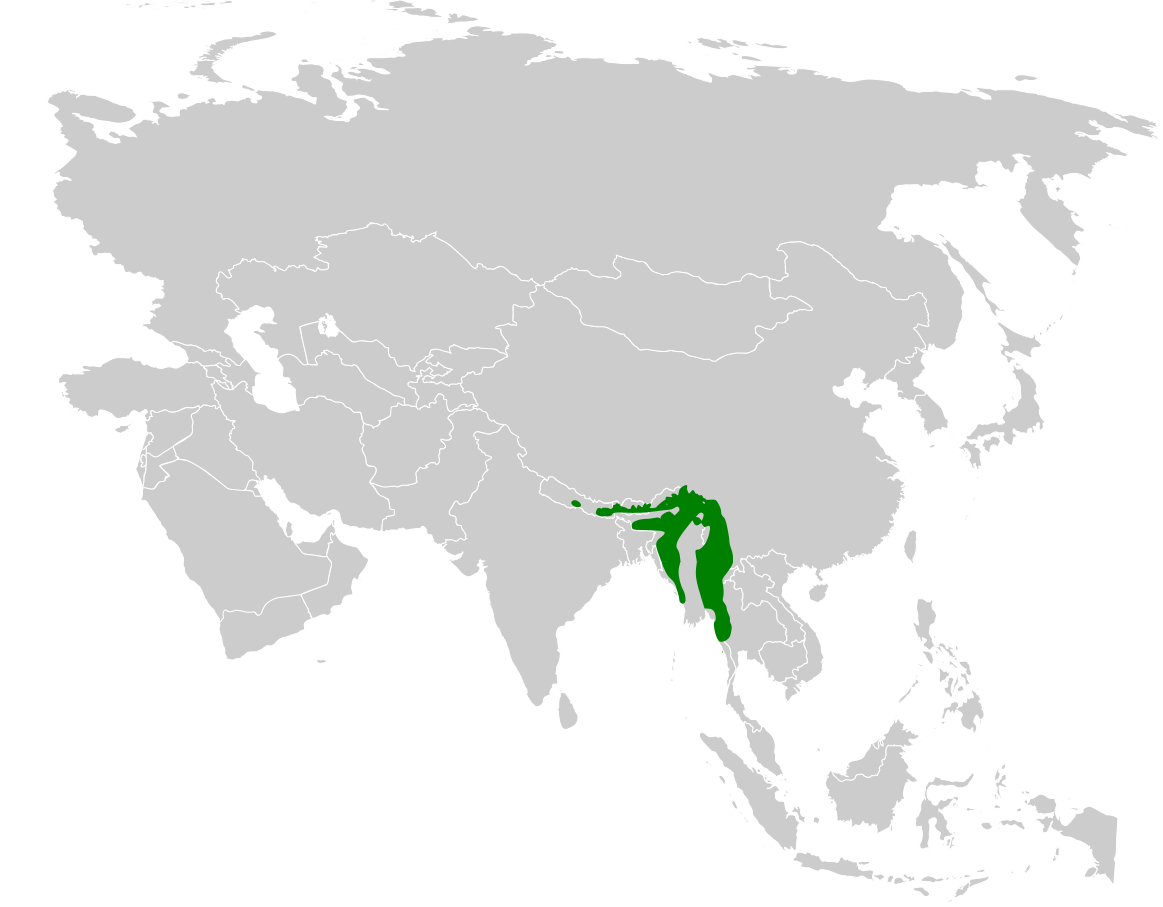

Synonyms
- Criniger flaveolus; Trichophorus flaveolus

= White-throated bulbul =

Species of songbird

The white-throated bulbul (Alophoixus flaveolus) is a species of songbird in the bulbul family, Pycnonotidae. It is found in south-eastern Asia from the eastern Himalayas to Myanmar and western Thailand. Its natural habitat is subtropical or tropical moist lowland forests.

== Taxonomy and systematics ==
The white-throated bulbul was originally described in the genus Trichophorus (a synonym for Criniger) until moved to the genus Alophoixus in 2009. Alternate names for the white-throated bulbul include the ashy-fronted bearded bulbul, ashy-fronted bulbul, white-throated bearded bulbul, and yellow-bellied bulbul. The alternate names 'ashy-fronted bulbul' and 'yellow-bellied bulbul' should not be confused with species of the same name (Pycnonotus cinereifrons and Alophoixus phaeocephalus respectively). The common name 'white-throated bulbul' is also used as an alternate name for each of the white-throated greenbul, eastern bearded greenbul, puff-throated bulbul and yellow-bellied bulbul. The alternate name 'white-throated bearded bulbul' is also used as an alternate name for the eastern bearded greenbul.

=== Subspecies ===
Two subspecies are recognized:

- A. f. flaveolus - (Gould, 1836): Found from eastern Himalayas to northern Myanmar
- A. f. burmanicus - (Oates, 1889): Originally described as a separate species in the genus Criniger. Found in south-eastern Myanmar, southern China and western Thailand

== Gallery ==
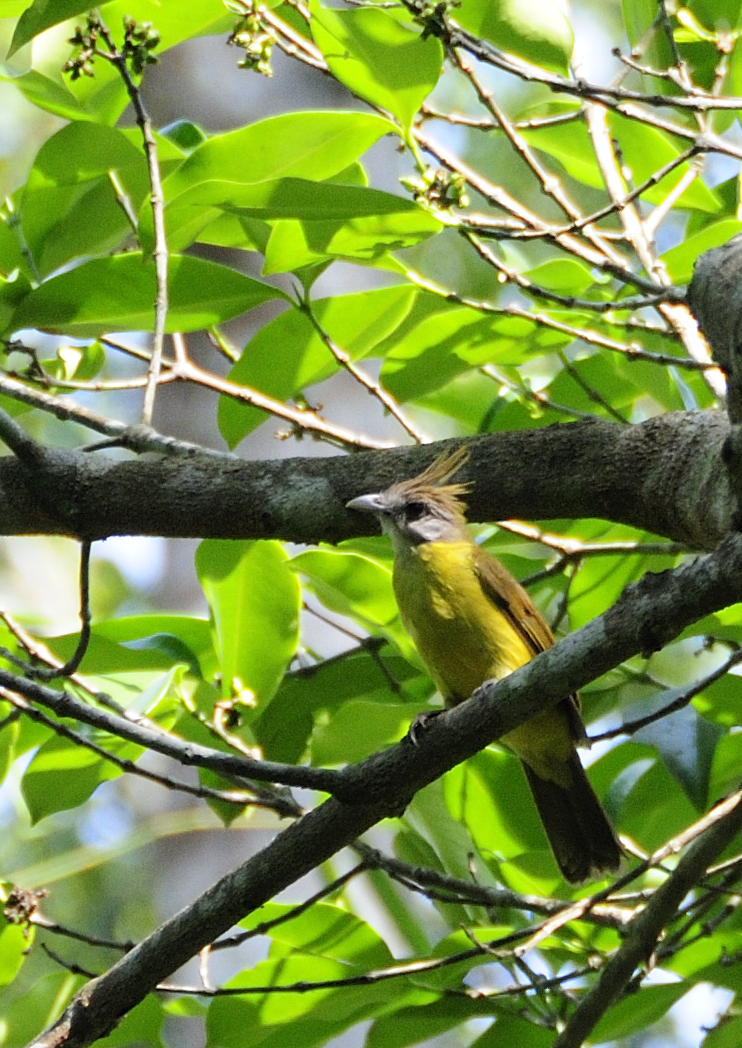
Front view

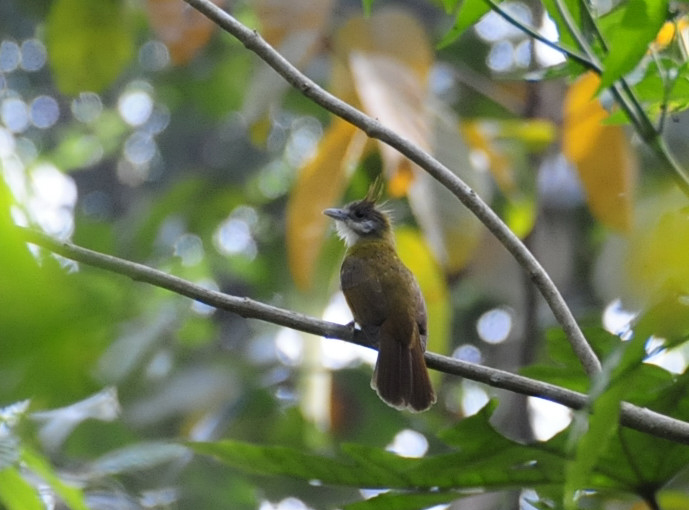
In Satchari National Park, Sylhet, Bangladesh
