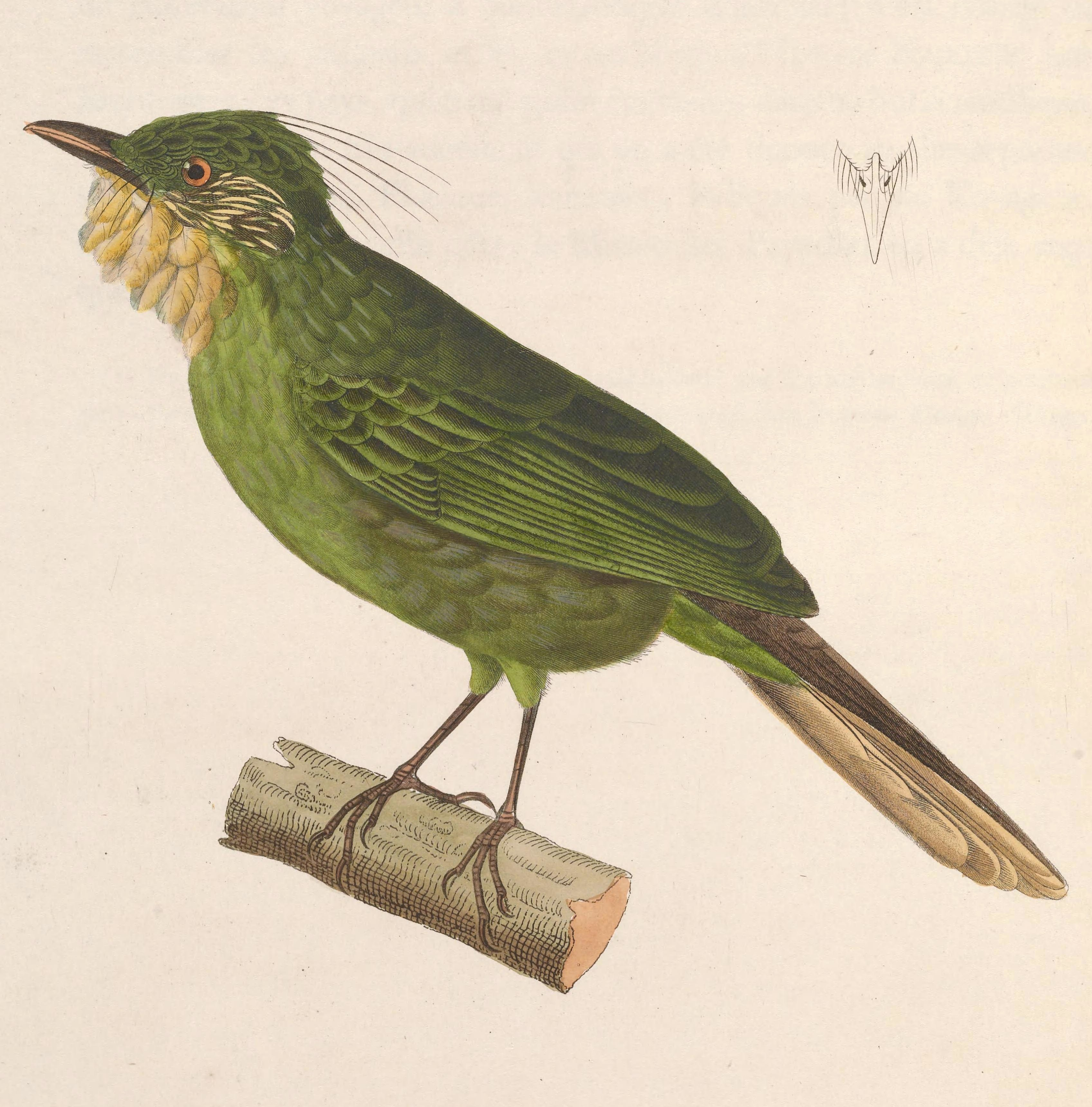

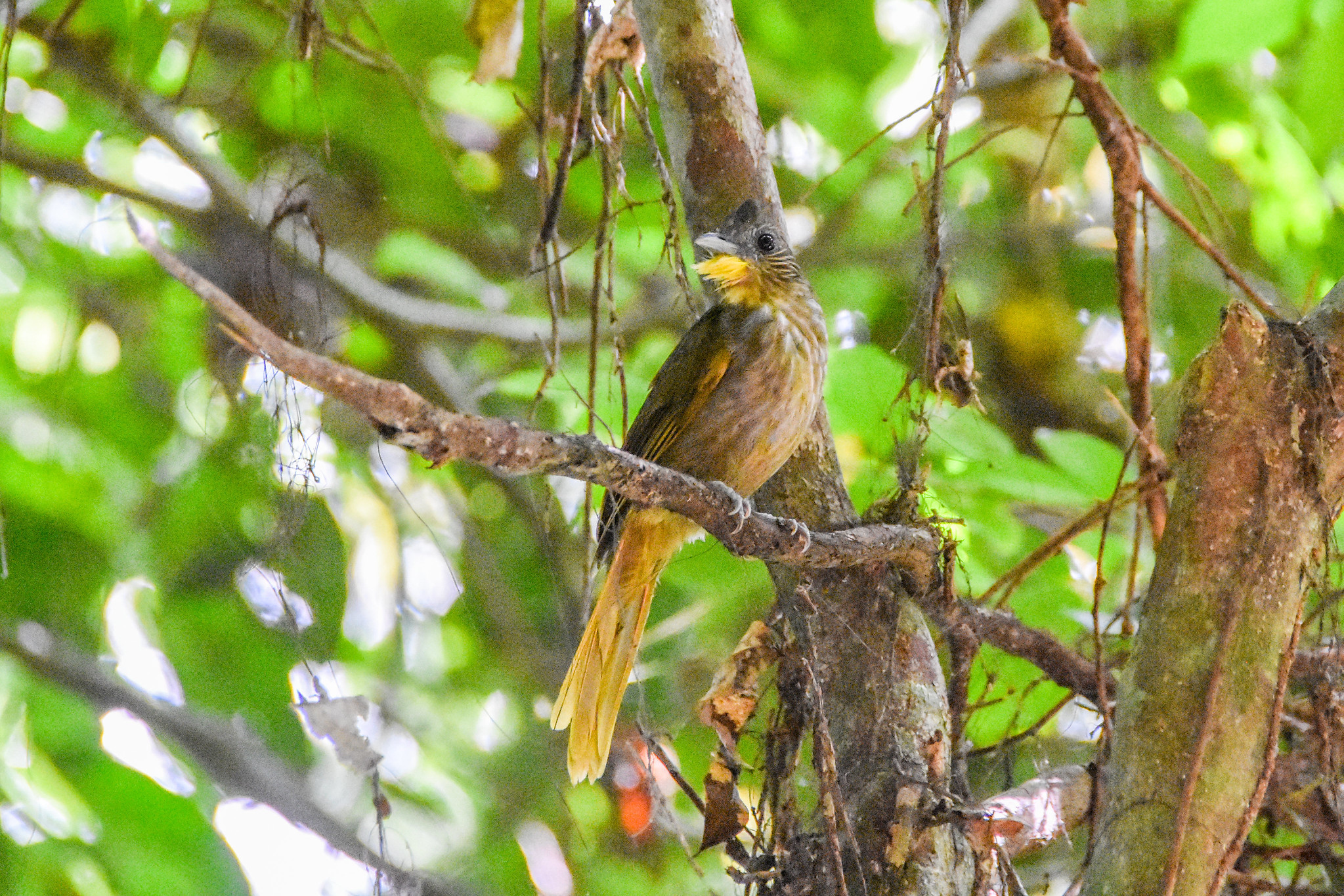

Conservation status
- Least Concern (IUCN 3.1)

Scientific classification
- Kingdom: Animalia
- Phylum: Chordata
- Class: Aves
- Order: Passeriformes
- Family: Pycnonotidae
- Genus: Criniger
- Species: C. barbatus

Binomial name
- Criniger barbatus (Temminck, 1821)
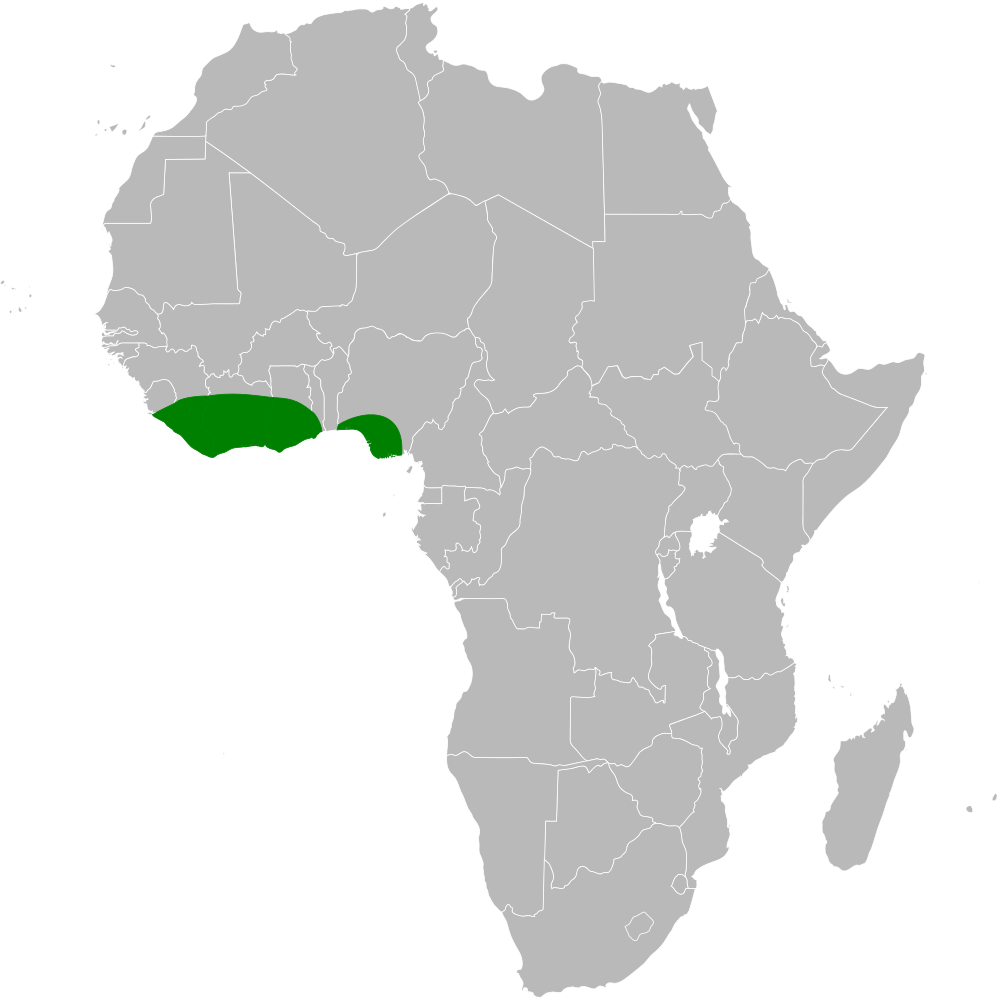

Synonyms
- Trichophorus barbatus

= Western bearded greenbul =

Species of songbird

The western bearded greenbul (Criniger barbatus) is a species of songbird in the bulbul family, Pycnonotidae. It is found in West Africa. Its natural habitats are subtropical or tropical dry forests and subtropical or tropical moist lowland forests.

== Taxonomy ==
The western bearded greenbul was formally described and illustrated in 1821 by the Dutch zoologist Coenraad Jacob Temminck from a specimen collected in Sierra Leone. He coined the binomial name Trichophorus barbatus.

Some authorities formerly considered the eastern bearded greenbul as conspecific with this species.

=== Subspecies ===
Two subspecies are recognized:

- Criniger barbatus barbatus (Temminck, 1821) – Found from Sierra Leone to Benin
- Criniger barbatus ansorgeanus Hartert, E, 1907 – Found in southern Nigeria
