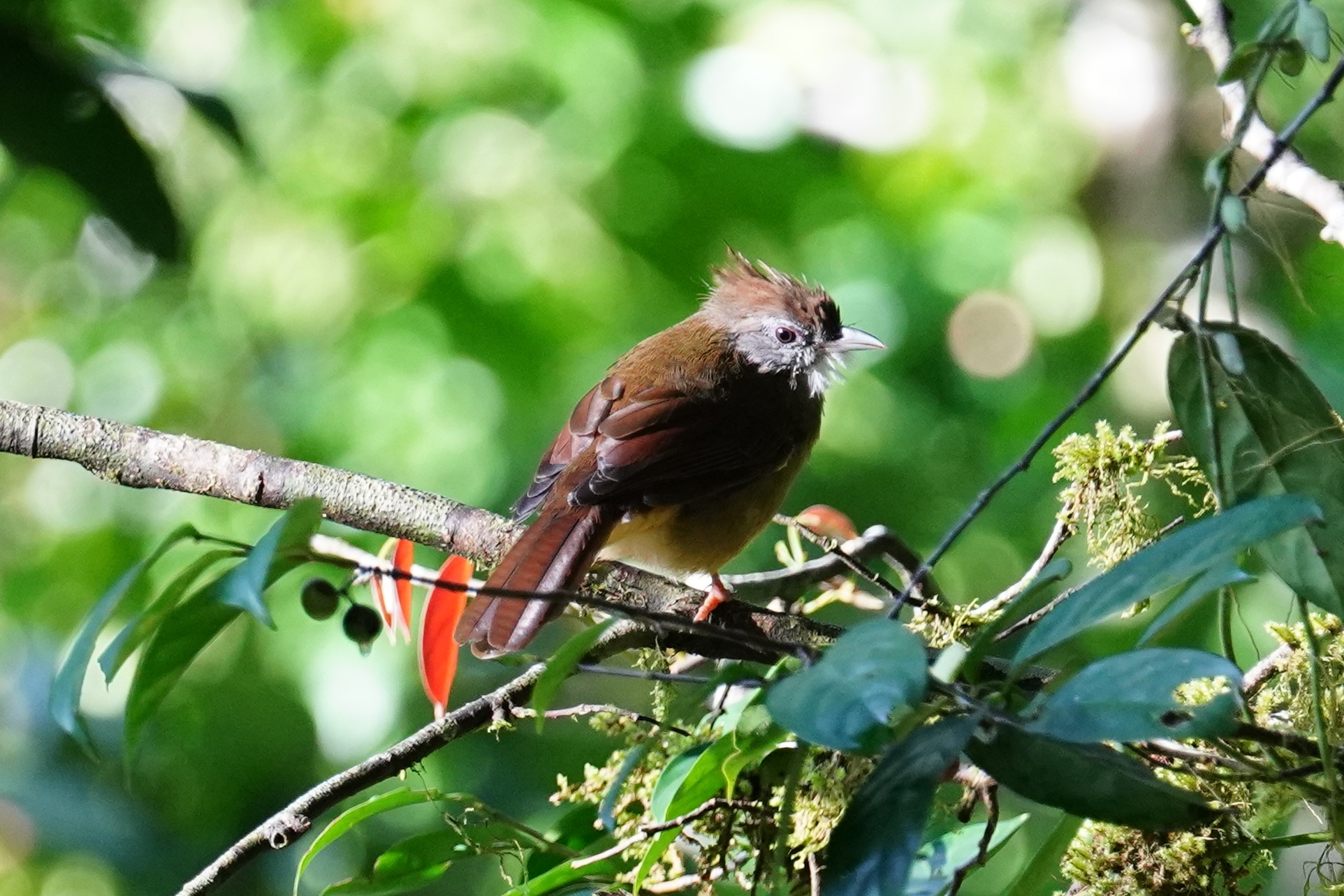
- In Khao Yai NP, Thailand

Conservation status
- Least Concern (IUCN 3.1)

Scientific classification
- Kingdom: Animalia
- Phylum: Chordata
- Class: Aves
- Order: Passeriformes
- Family: Pycnonotidae
- Genus: Alophoixus
- Species: A. pallidus

Binomial name
- Alophoixus pallidus (R. Swinhoe, 1870)
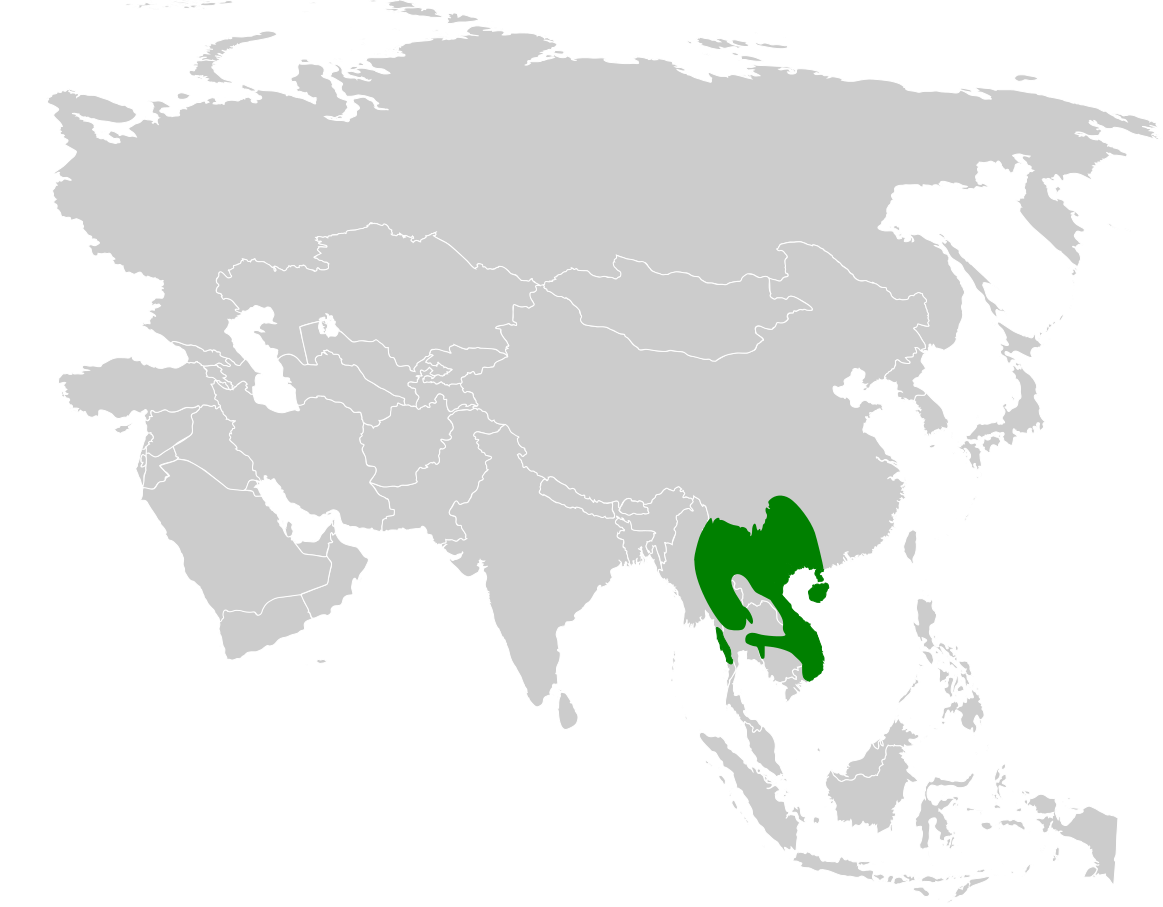

Synonyms
- Criniger pallidus

= Puff-throated bulbul =

Species of bird

The puff-throated bulbul (Alophoixus pallidus) is a songbird in the bulbul family, Pycnonotidae. The species was first described by Robert Swinhoe in 1870. It is found in Southeast Asia. Its natural habitat is subtropical or tropical moist lowland forests.

== Taxonomy and systematics ==
The puff-throated bulbul was originally described in the genus Criniger until moved to the genus Alophoixus in 2009. Alternate names for the puff-throated bulbul include the olivaceous bearded-bulbul, olivaceous bulbul and white-throated bulbul. The latter name should not be confused with the species of the same name, Alophoixus flaveolus.

=== Subspecies ===
Seven subspecies are recognized:

- Grey-crowned bulbul (A. p. griseiceps) - (Hume, 1873): Originally described as a separate species in the genus Criniger. Found in the Pegu Yoma Mountains (south-central Myanmar)
- A. p. robinsoni - (Ticehurst, 1932): Found in Tenasserim (south-eastern Myanmar)
- A. p. henrici - (Oustalet, 1896): Originally described as a separate species in the genus Criniger. Found in south-western China, eastern Myanmar, northern Thailand and northern Indochina
- A. p. pallidus - (R. Swinhoe, 1870): Found on Hainan Island (off south-eastern China)
- A. p. isani - (Deignan, 1956): Found in north-eastern Thailand
- A. p. annamensis - (Delacour & Jabouille, 1924): Found in central Indochina
- A. p. khmerensis - (Deignan, 1956): Found in southern Indochina

== Description ==
The puff-throated bulbul is a large (23 cm long) bulbul with olive upperparts, yellow underparts, and puffy white throat feathers. It is similar in appearance to the white-throated bulbul but with duller underparts. It has black feet and brown iris and bill. Males and females are visually indistinguishable.

== Behaviour and ecology ==
The puff-throated bulbul is a regular but not an obligate cooperative breeder. Groups can comprise one or more breeding pairs and breed either cooperatively or non-cooperatively. In cases of multiple breeding pairs in a single territory, the pairs nest separately. The female builds the nest and incubates and broods the young. Males and helpers aid in feeding the nestlings and fledglings. Nests are open cups typically located in the understorey.
