= Eastern bearded greenbul =

Conservation status
- Least Concern (IUCN 3.1)

Scientific classification
- Kingdom: Animalia
- Phylum: Chordata
- Class: Aves
- Order: Passeriformes
- Family: Pycnonotidae
- Genus: Criniger
- Species: C. chloronotus

Binomial name
- Criniger chloronotus (Cassin, 1859)
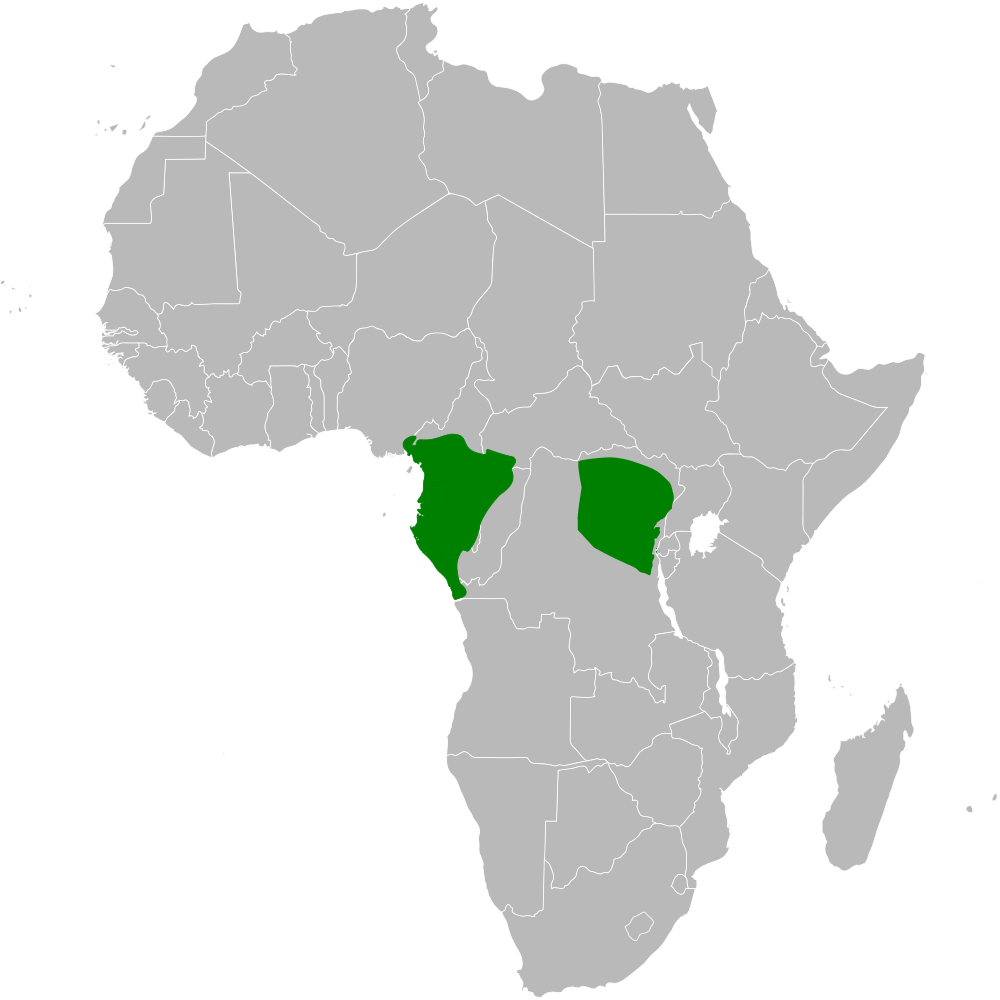

Synonyms
- Criniger barbatus chloronotus; Hypsipetes malaccensis; Trichophorus chloronotus

Species of songbird

The eastern bearded greenbul (Criniger chloronotus) is a species of songbird in the bulbul family, Pycnonotidae. It is found from south-eastern Nigeria to Central African Republic, north-eastern Democratic Republic of the Congo, Congo and extreme north-western Angola. Its natural habitats are subtropical or tropical moist lowland forests and subtropical or tropical moist montane forests.

== Taxonomy and systematics ==
The eastern bearded greenbul was originally described in the genus Hypsipetes. Formerly, some authorities considered the eastern bearded greenbul as conspecific with the western bearded greenbul. Alternate names for the eastern bearded greenbul include the bearded bulbul, Congo bulbul, eastern bearded bulbul, green-backed bulbul, oriental bearded bulbul, white-throated bearded-bulbul, white-throated bearded-greenbul and white-throated bulbul. The latter two alternate names should not be confused with the species of the same name, Alophoixus flaveolus. Both the alternate name 'green-backed bulbul' and the synonym Hypsipetes malaccensis are also shared with the streaked bulbul.
