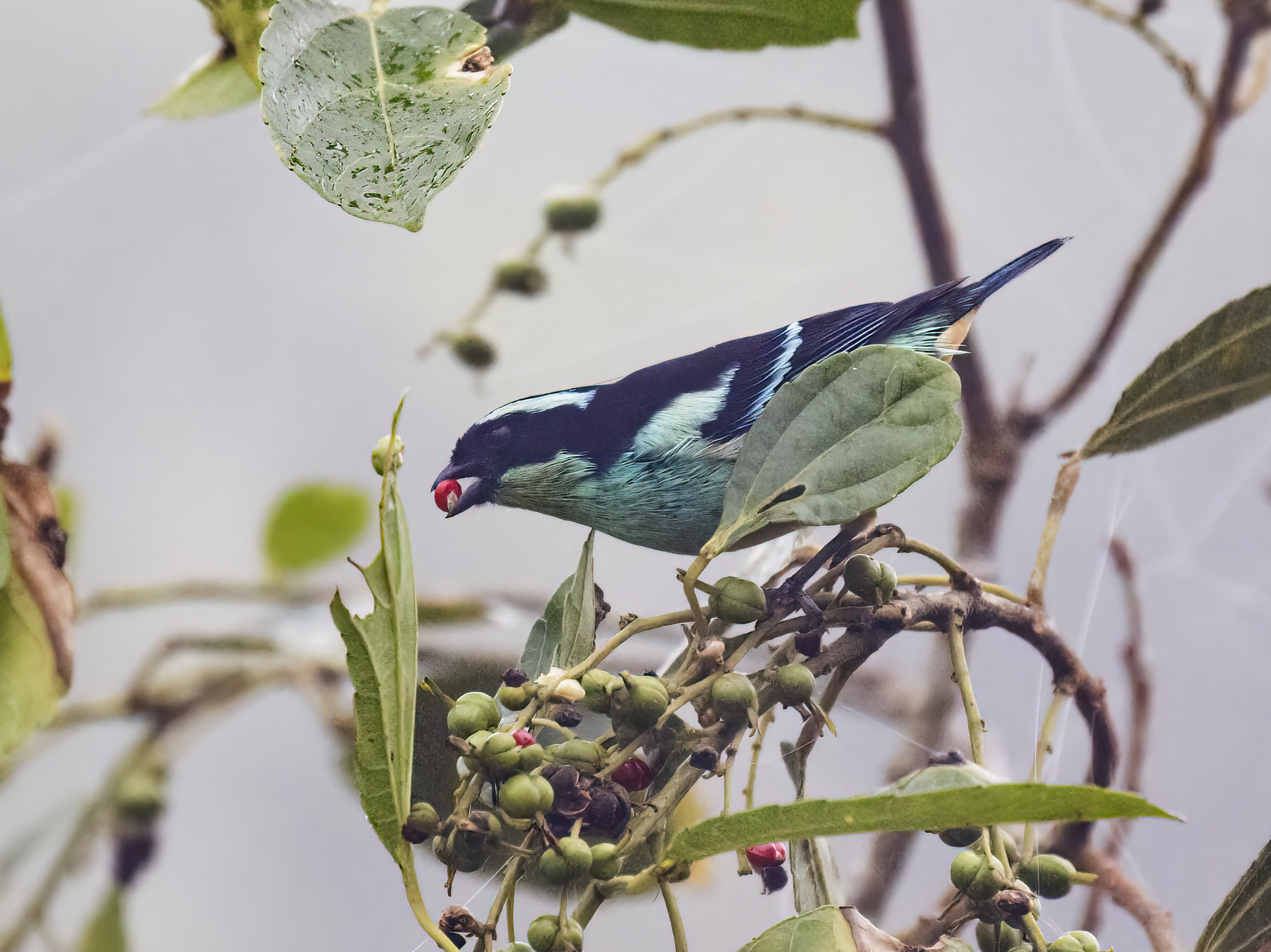

Conservation status
- Least Concern (IUCN 3.1)

Scientific classification
- Kingdom: Animalia
- Phylum: Chordata
- Class: Aves
- Order: Passeriformes
- Family: Thraupidae
- Genus: Tangara
- Species: T. cyanotis

Binomial name
- Tangara cyanotis (Sclater, PL, 1858)

= Blue-browed tanager =

Species of bird

The blue-browed tanager (Tangara cyanotis) is a species of bird in the family Thraupidae. It is found in Bolivia, Colombia, Ecuador, and Peru. Its natural habitat is subtropical or tropical moist montane forests.

== Taxonomy and systematics ==
The blue-browed tanager was first described as Calliste cyanotis by Philip Sclater in 1858, on the basis of a specimen sent by M. Verreaux. The generic name Tangara is from the Tupí word tangara, meaning dancer. The specific name cyanotis is from the Ancient Greek words κυανος (kuanos), meaning dark blue, and ωτις (otis), meaning eared. Blue-browed tanager is the official common name designated by the International Ornithologists' Union (IOC).

The blue-browed tanager is one of 27 species in the genus Tangara. Within the genus, it is placed in a species group with the golden-naped tanager and the metallic-green tanager. While DNA evidence suggests that the golden-naped tanager is not closely related to the other two species in the genus, it is likely that the blue-browed and metallic-green tanagers are sister to each other.

There are two recognized species of the blue-browed tanager. They are differentiated by differences in plumage.

- T. c. lutleyi Hellmayr, 1917: Found from southern Colombia to Ecuador and Peru. It differs from the nominate in having a black back and ear coverts.
- T. c. cyanotis (Sclater, PL, 1858): The nominate subspecies, it is found in Bolivia and southeastern Peru.

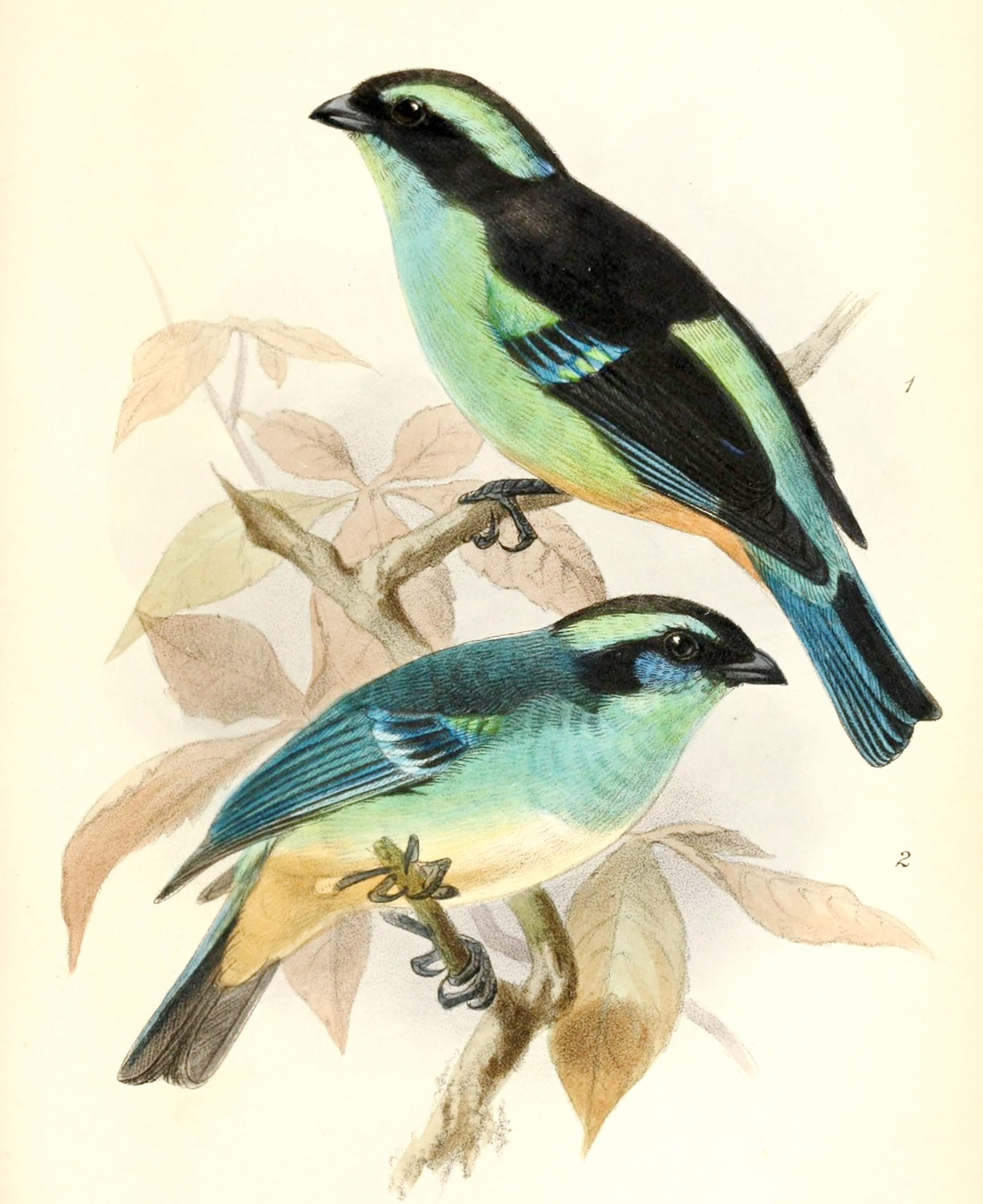
Tangara cyanotis melanotis & Tangara cyanotis cyanotis
