= Auguste Boissonneau =

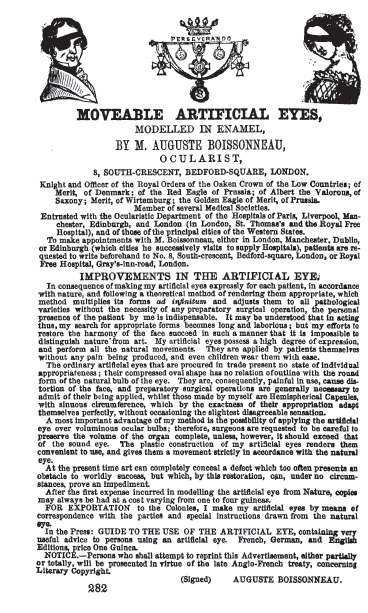
Advertisement from Boissonneau in The Medical Directory for Scotland, 1854

Auguste Boissonneau (26 July 1802, Saumur – 7 July 1883, Paris) was a French ornithologist and ocularist. In the latter field he was a pioneer of ocular prosthesis.

As an ornithologist, he was the taxonomic authority of numerous species native to tropical and subtropical South America. The hummingbird genus Boissonneaua (Reichenbach, 1854) commemorates his name, as does the species Pseudocolaptes boissonneautii (streaked tuftedcheek), a bird circumscribed by Frédéric de Lafresnaye in 1840.

== Ornithological taxa described by Boissonneau ==
- Black-chested mountain tanager - Cnemathraupis eximia.
- Blue-and-black tanager - Tangara vassorii.
- Blue cotinga - Cotinga nattererii.
- Bronze-tailed thornbill - Chalcostigma heteropogon.
- Buff-breasted mountain tanager - Dubusia taeniata.
- Collared inca - Coeligena torquata.
- Colombian mountain grackle - Macroagelaius subalaris.
- Crimson-mantled woodpecker - Piculus rivolii.
- Glossy flowerpiercer - Diglossa lafresnayii.
- Green-and-black fruiteater - Pipreola riefferii.
- Green-bearded helmetcrest - Oxypogon guerinii.
- Golden-bellied starfrontlet - Coeligena bonapartei.
- Golden-fronted whitestart- Myioborus ornatus.
- Grey-browed brush finch - Arremon assimilis.
- Metallic-green tanager - Tangara labradorides.
- Mountain velvetbreast - Lafresnaya lafresnayi.
- Moustached brush finch - Atlapetes albofrenatus.
- Pale-naped brush finch - Atlapetes pallidinucha.
- Purple-backed thornbill - Ramphomicron microrhynchum.
- Slaty brush finch - Atlapetes schistaceus.
- Smoky bush tyrant - Myiotheretes fumigatus.
- Sword-billed hummingbird - Ensifera ensifera
- White-throated toucanet - Aulacorhynchus albivitta.

== As a specimen dealer ==
In his 1837 Catalogue d'oiseaux empaillés, Boissonneau offered bird skins for sale to the Sociéte Impériale des Naturalistes de Moscou. Among his customers were Côme-Damien Degland, who ran the Musée Ornithologique de Come Damien Degland, Baron Frédéric de Lafresnaye, Jean Louis Cabanis for the Museum für Naturkunde zu Berlin, the Hof-Naturalienkabinett in Vienna Coenraad Jacob Temminck for the Reichsmuseum für Naturgeschichte in Leiden and many more. In addition to the museums, private collectors also purchased bird skins, such as George Loddiges and Benjamin Leadbeater.Later, the Natural History Museum in London acquired Loddige's material.

== Partial bibliography ==
- Nouvelles espèces d'Oiseaux-Mouches de Santa-Fé de Bogota, Revue zoologique la Société cuviérienne, 1839, S. 354–356.
- Oiseaux nouveaux ou peu connus de Santa-Fé de Bogota, Revue zoologique la Société cuviérienne, 1840, S. 2–8.
- Nouvelle espèce du genre Pic, Revue zoologique la Société cuviérienne, 1840, S. 36–37
- Oiseaux nouveaux de Santa-Fé de Bogota, Revue zoologique la Société cuviérienne, 1840, S. 66–71.
- Recherche sur l'histoire des yeux artifisiels, Annales de la Société de médecine de Gand, 1843.
- Prothèse oculaire. Yeux artificiels mobiles de M. Boissonneau, 1849.
- "Methode of complete and individual appropriation of artificial eyes comprising the different kinds of advertissements, with the wood cuts belonging to them. M. Auguste Boissonneau's moveable artificial eyes..." W. T. Soulby, 1853.
- De la Restauration de la physionomie chez les personnes privées d'un oeil, 1859.
