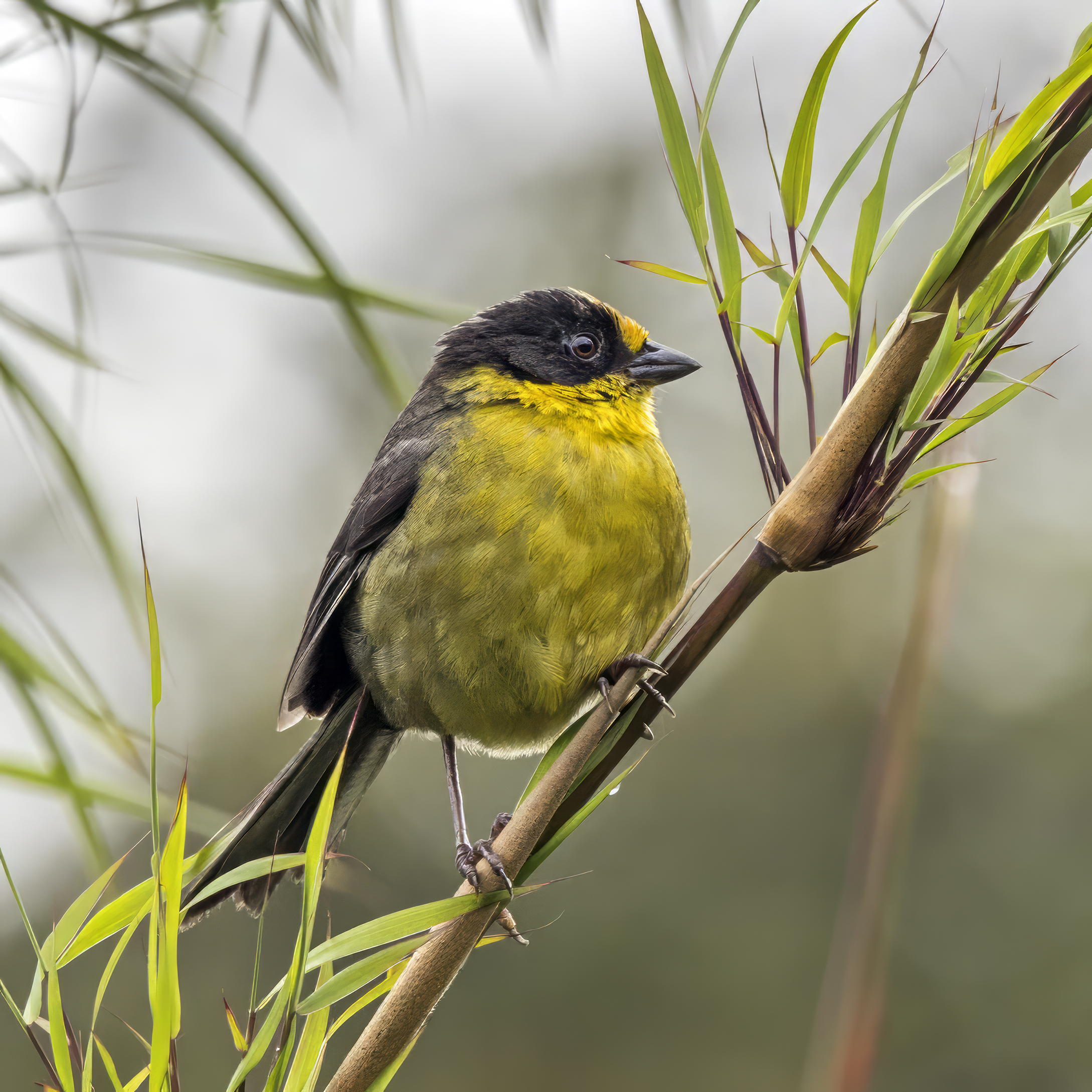
- A. p. pallidinucha Cundinamarca, Colombia

Conservation status
- Least Concern (IUCN 3.1)

Scientific classification
- Kingdom: Animalia
- Phylum: Chordata
- Class: Aves
- Order: Passeriformes
- Family: Passerellidae
- Genus: Atlapetes
- Species: A. pallidinucha

Binomial name
- Atlapetes pallidinucha (Boissonneau, 1840)

= Pale-naped brushfinch =

Species of bird

The pale-naped brushfinch (Atlapetes pallidinucha) is a species of bird in the family Passerellidae, the New World sparrows. It is found in Colombia, Ecuador, Peru, and Venezuela.

== Taxonomy and systematics ==
The pale-naped brushfinch was formally described in 1840 with the binomial Tanagra (Arremon) pallidinucha. It was reassigned to its present genus Atlapetes in 1911.

The pale-naped brushfinch has two subspecies, the nominate A. p. pallidinucha (Boissonneau, 1840) and A. p. papallactae (Hellmayr, 1913).

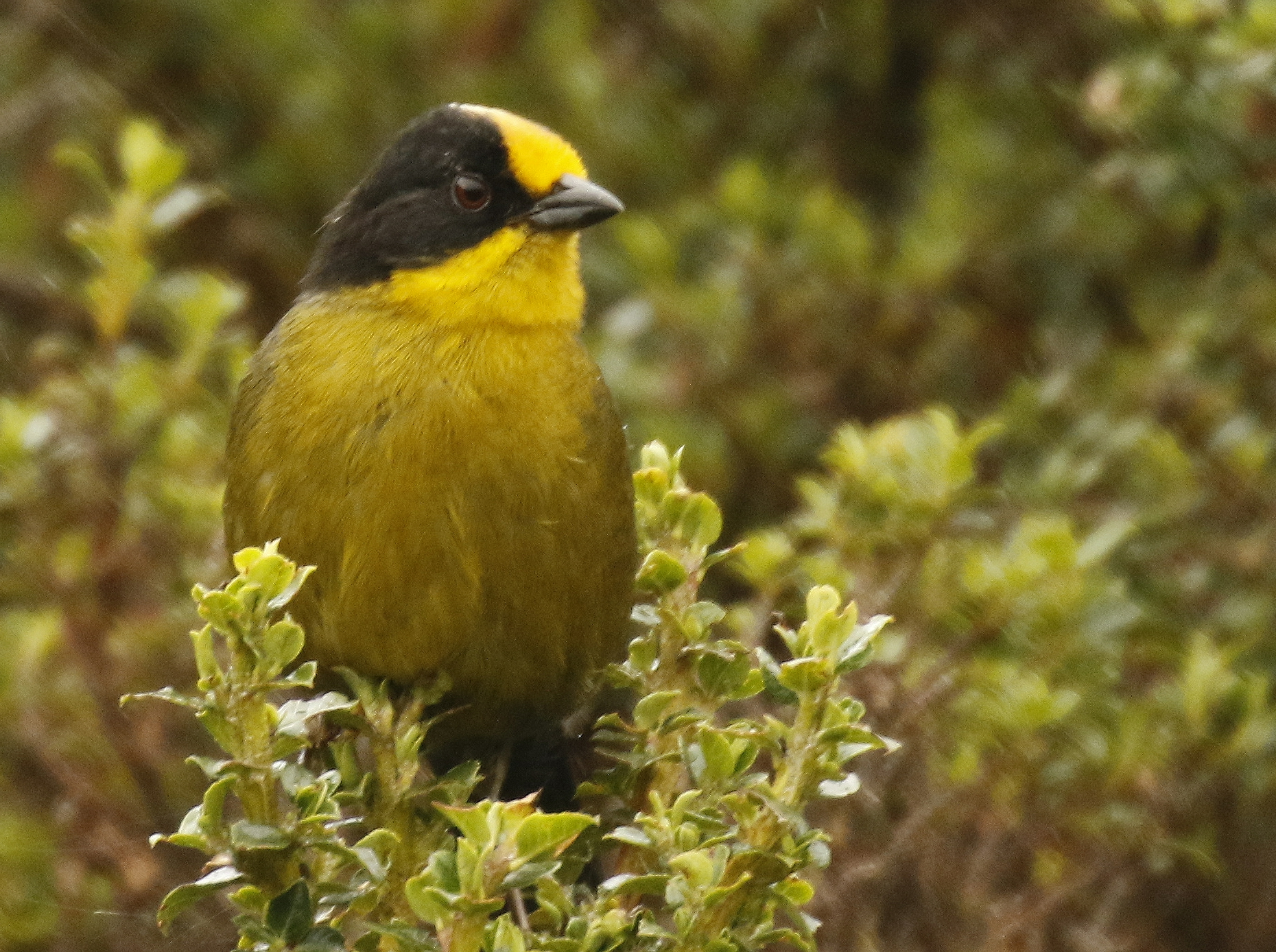
A. p. papallactae at Papallacta Pass, Ecuador

== Description ==
The pale-naped brushfinch is about 18 cm (7.1 in) long and weighs about 21 to 40 g (0.74 to 1.4 oz). The sexes have the same plumage. Adults of the nominate subspecies have a wide pale cinnamon stripe from the forehead to the middle of the crown, a white rear crown and nape, and a black face. Their upperparts are dark slate gray and their wings and tail blackish. Their throat, breast, and belly are bright yellow. Their sides, flanks, and undertail coverts are washed with olivaceous to gray. Juveniles are duller overall than adults with a thin crown streak, a brownish wash on the upperparts, and dusky streaks on the breast. Adults of subspecies A. p. papallactae have a very pale cinnamon or yellow forehead and their underparts except the throat are washed olivaceous to gray. Juveniles are browner than adults and have darker underparts. Adults of both subspecies have a dark chestnut iris, a short, thick, black bill, and pinkish-dusky legs and feet.

== Distribution and habitat ==
The pale-naped brushfinch has a disjunct distribution. The nominate is the more northerly of the two. It is found from far southern Táchira in western Venezuela south in Colombia's Eastern Andes to Cundinamarca Department. Subspecies A. p. papallactae is found in Colombia's Central Andes and south on the eastern Andean slope through Ecuador into far northern Peru to the Marañón River on the border of Piura and Cajamarca departments.

The pale-naped brushfinch inhabits the understory and edges of humid forest near tree line, including secondary forest and elfin forest. It also occurs in the forest interior where it favors bamboo thickets. In elevation it ranges between 2,500 to 3,275 m (8,200 to 10,700 ft) in Venezuela, between 2,400 to 3,300 m (7,900 to 10,800 ft) in Colombia, mostly between 2,700 to 3,700 m (8,900 to 12,100 ft) in Ecuador, and between 2,500 to 3,200 m (8,200 to 10,500 ft) in Peru.

== Behavior ==
=== Movement ===
The pale-naped brushfinch is a year-round resident.

=== Feeding ===
The pale-naped brushfinch feeds on insects, berries, and seeds. It forages on the ground or a little above it, usually in dense vegetation. It forages in pairs or family groups and often joins mixed-species feeding flocks.

=== Breeding ===
The pale-naped brushfinch's breeding season has not been fully defined. It spans at least February to September in Colombia and includes November in Ecuador. One nest is known. It was a cup made from dry twigs and grass with moss on its outer bottom and lined with woven thin dry grass. It was 40 cm (16 in) above the ground in a thicket of grass and bamboo. It held one egg that was pale greenish blue with dark spots and blotches. The incubation period, time to fledging, and details of parental care are not known.

=== Vocalization ===
The pale-naped brushfinch's dawn song, usually given in duet, is "a thin, high tsie...tsie weu, tsi...tsie weu tsie weu, ti...ti wee tsits we weee or tsie...tsie tsieu". The first tsi notes are alike or descending and the tsieu note rises sharply. Its territorial song is "wheet-tew-tew-tew". Its calls are "a high-pitched soft tip" and a repeated "nasal pffe".

== Status ==
The IUCN has assessed the pale-naped brushfinch as being of Least Concern. It has a large range; its population size is not known but is believed to be stable. No immediate threats have been identified. It is considered fairly common in Venezuela and Peru and common in Colombia.
