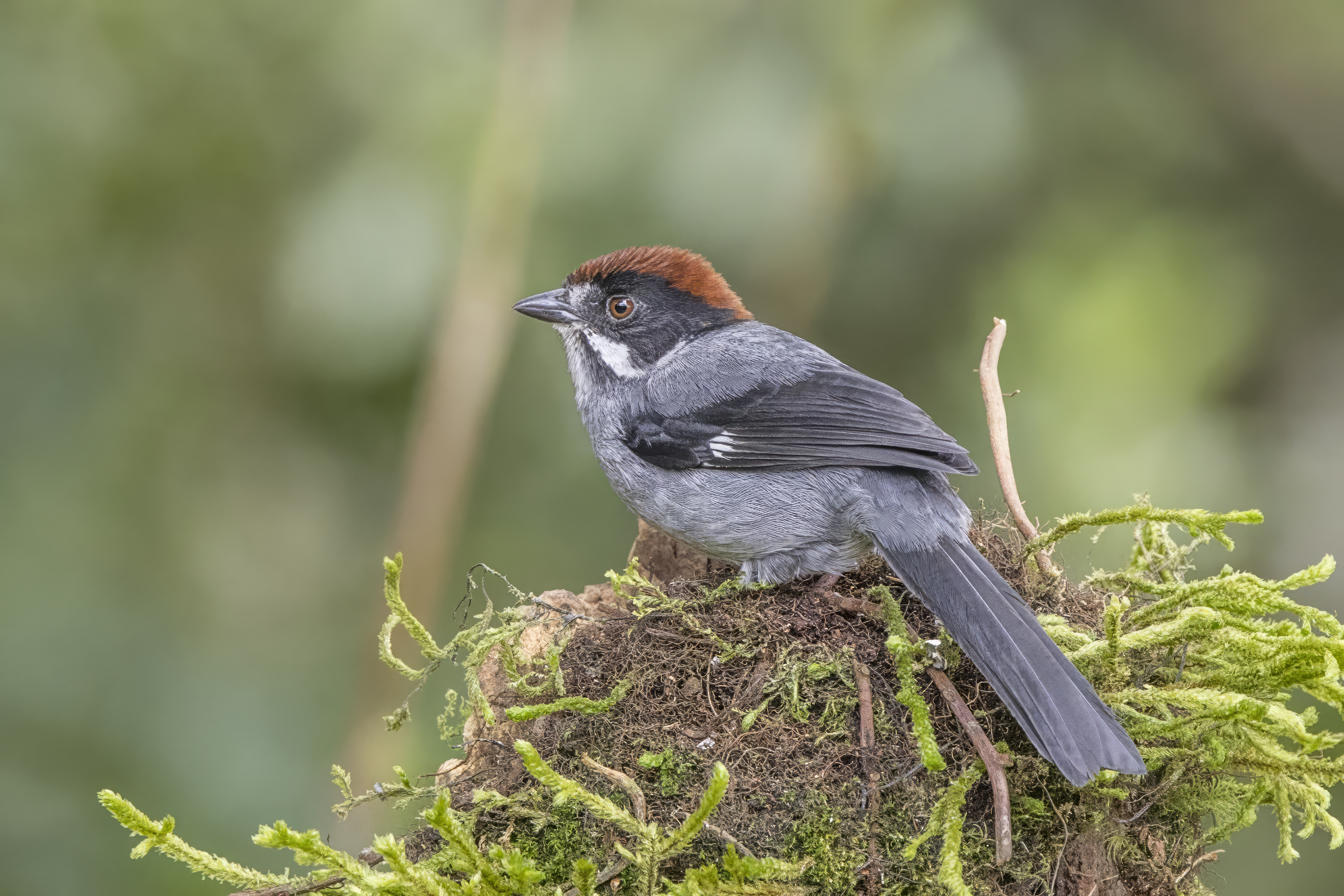
- In Colombia

Conservation status
- Least Concern (IUCN 3.1)

Scientific classification
- Kingdom: Animalia
- Phylum: Chordata
- Class: Aves
- Order: Passeriformes
- Family: Passerellidae
- Genus: Atlapetes
- Species: A. schistaceus

Binomial name
- Atlapetes schistaceus (Boissonneau, 1840)

= Slaty brushfinch =

Species of bird

The slaty brushfinch or northern slaty brushfinch (Atlapetes schistaceus) is a species of bird in the family Passerellidae, the New World sparrows. It is found from Venezuela to Ecuador.

== Taxonomy and systematics ==
The slaty brushfinch was formally described in 1840 with the binomial Tanagra (Arremon) schistaceus. It was reassigned to its present genus Atlapetes in 1911.

The slaty brushfinch has these four subspecies:

- A. s. fumidus Wetmore & Phelps, WH Jr, 1953
- A. s. castaneifrons (Sclater, PL & Salvin, 1875)
- A. s. tamae Cory, 1913
- A. s. schistaceus (Boissonneau, 1840)

What is now the Cuzco brushfinch (A. canigenis) was long treated as another subspecies but by the early twenty-first century it was widely recognized as a full species. What most taxonomic systems recognize as Taczanowski's brushfinch (A. taczanowskii) was also long treated as another subspecies. BirdLife International's Handbook of the Birds of the World recognized it as a species in 2016. The IOC and the Clements taxonomy followed suit in 2024, though Clements calls it the Peruvian slaty brushfinch. The first version of AviList in 2025 also recognized it. However, as of February 2026 the independent South American Classification Committee has declined to recognize the split.

This article follows the four-subspecies model.

== Description ==
The slaty brushfinch is 17 to 18 cm (6.7 to 7.1 in) long and weighs about 23 to 44 g (0.81 to 1.6 oz). The sexes have the same plumage. Adults of the nominate subspecies A. s. schistaceus have a rusty crown and nape and a mostly black face. They have a whitish spot on the lores and a long white "moustache" with a thin black stripe below it. Their upperparts are dark gray and their tail blackish. Their wings are mostly blackish with white bases on the primaries and white marginal coverts. The last shows as a white spot on the folded wing. Their throat is whitish with dark speckles, their breast, flanks, and undertail coverts medium gray, and the center of their belly whitish. Juveniles have some black streaks in the crown and blackish streaks on the breast and flanks.

Subspecies A. s. castaneifrons has a paler crown than the nominate with nearly blackish upperparts and no white on the primaries. A. s. fumidus has paler upperparts and darker underparts than castaneifrons. A. s. tamae also is like castaneifrons with darker underparts. All subspecies have a dark reddish brown iris, a blackish bill, and brown-gray legs and feet.

== Distribution and habitat ==
The slaty brushfinch has a disjunct distribution. The subspecies are found thus:

- A. s. fumidus: the Serranía del Perijá that straddles the Colombia-Venezuela border
- A. s. castaneifrons: Venezuelan Andes from northern Táchira north to far southern Lara state
- A. s. tamae: from southern Táchira in western Venezuela into adjoining Norte de Santander Department in eastern Colombia
- A. s. schistaceus: Colombia's Western and Central Andes and south on the eastern Andean slope to northern Azuay Province in central Ecuador

The slaty brushfinch inhabits the shrubby edges and undergrowth of a variety of humid to wet forest types. These include elfin forest, cloudforest, and montane secondary forest. In Venezuela it also occurs above tree line in patches of trees. In elevation it ranges between 2,000 and 3,800 m (6,600 and 12,500 ft) in Venezuela, between 2,000 and 3,600 m (6,600 and 11,800 ft) in Colombia, and mostly between 2,500 and 3,400 m (8,200 and 11,200 ft) in Ecuador.

== Behavior ==
=== Movement ===
The slaty brushfinch is a year-round resident.

=== Feeding ===
The slaty brushfinch feeds on a wide variety of insects, other small invertebrates, and fruits. It forages singly or in pairs and regularly joins mixed-species feeding flocks. It mostly forages in the forest undergrowth up to about 5 m (15 ft) above the ground, in contrast to many other brushfinches which forage mainly near the ground. However, it does forage as high as the canopy. It generally takes its food by gleaning.

=== Breeding ===
The slaty brushfinch's breeding season has not been fully defined. It includes November in Venezuela, apparently spans April to September or beyond in Colombia, and includes December in Ecuador. Nothing else is known about the species' breeding biology.

=== Vocalization ===
The slaty brushfinch sings mostly at dawn, "a short tsuu, tweet-tweet". Pairs sing in duet, "poorly coordinated...high-pitched notes and trills that end with [a] distinctive chewy-chewy-chewy or t'chew, t'chew, t'chew". When foraging it makes "thin tseet notes".

== Status ==
The IUCN has assessed the slaty brushfinch as being of Least Concern. It has a large range; its population size is not known and is believed to be decreasing. No immediate threats have been identified. It is considered common in Venezuela and Colombia and less common in Ecuador.
