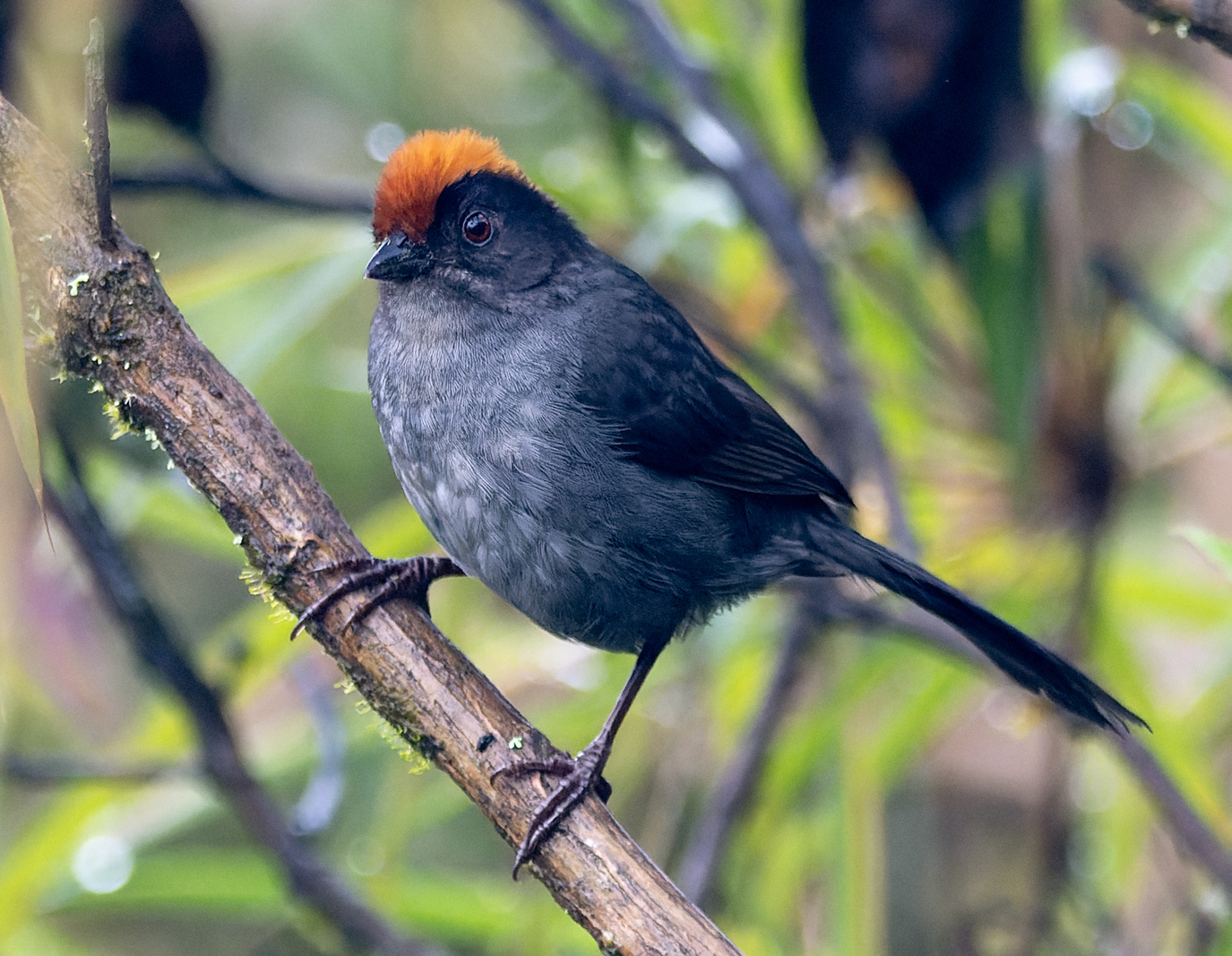

Conservation status
- Least Concern (IUCN 3.1)

Scientific classification
- Kingdom: Animalia
- Phylum: Chordata
- Class: Aves
- Order: Passeriformes
- Family: Passerellidae
- Genus: Atlapetes
- Species: A. canigenis

Binomial name
- Atlapetes canigenis Chapman, 1919

= Cuzco brushfinch =

Species of bird

The Cuzco brushfinch (Atlapetes canigenis), also known as the grey brushfinch or sooty brushfinch, is a species of bird in the family Passerellidae. It is endemic to humid Andean forest in southeastern Peru, where mainly found in Cusco. It is sometimes considered a subspecies of the slaty brushfinch.

== Description ==
Brushfinches are typically medium-size sparrows, with long tails. Brushfinches are usually gray or olive in colour with a contrasting crown. Cuzco brushfinches are two-toned with a uniform dusky gray and a rufous crown. The center of the belly, as well as the other underparts, are lighter gray than the outside, which is dark gray and the rufous color extends to the nape. The crown is boarded by a black stripe extending from in front of the eyes until the gray auriculars. The tail and wings are blackish with the primaries margined slightly with a grayish external. There is a slight fulvous or tawny tint to the remiges most external parts.

One important note is that the Cuzco brushfinch shows considerable variation with the intensity of gray in the underparts - some almost uniformly dark gray below and others that are pale gray with grayish-white abdomens.

Males and females are extremely similar in colour, with the female being slightly smaller.

=== Measurements ===
Adults:

Male: wing 76 mm (3.0 in), tail 78 mm, tarsus 27 mm (1.1 in), culmen 15.5 mm (0.61 in)

Female: wing 72 mm (2.8 in), tail 72 mm, tarsus 25 mm, culmen 15 mm

== Taxonomy ==
The Cuzco brushfinch is a species in the genus Atlapetes - along with 30 others. This genus is in the under-class Aves, order passeriformes (songbirds) and family Emberizidae. The Cuzco brushfinch has been denoted in 1919 by Chapman as Atlapetes canigenis.

In 1938 canigenis was categorized as a subspecies of slaty brushfinch. However, Canigenis is in a clade that contains other taxa of Atlapetes from southern Peru and Bolivia, such as Atlapetes melanolaemus (black-faced brush-finch), Atlapetes melanopsis (black-spectacled brush-finch) and Atlapetes forbesi (Apurimac brush-finch), and is not as closely related to schistaceus as once thought.

Remsen and Graves (1995) later predicted that the populations of the slaty brushfinch are not monophyletic but rather have a closer relatedness to the parapatric populations of rufous-naped brushfinch. This species had population distributed from northwestern Venezuela to Bolivia.

Many brushfinches occur in this area; for example, A. mfinucha rerborghi, A. schistaceus canigenis and A. mfinucha tnelnizolaernus, which all have a similarly rather poorly developed malar stripe. However this does not imply a close relationship, despite all looking very similar and having a similar habitat. Paynter (1978) hypothesised no close relationship between A. melanolaemus and A. canigenis.

== Distribution and habitat ==
=== Distribution ===
The Cuzco brushfinch is native to the Americas. More specifically it is an endemic of south-central Peru where it is found in montane areas of the Andes. The known elevation range for this brushfinch is approximately 2,300–3,600 m (7,550–11,810 ft) above sea level. They are mostly seen in the surrounding areas of Cusco.

=== Habitat ===
There is very little information on the specific habitat of the Cuzco brushfinch. They do tend to reside in the humid temperate zone of the Andes, as they thrive in humid montane forest on the slopes.

== Behavior ==
=== Vocalization ===
The Cuzco brushfinch has complex series of high-pitched squeaks. It is described as "shrill trill followed by a chatter and tew-tew-tew swee swee".

Their "dawn song" was defined as the varied phrases given at regular intervals by the male alone, mainly or only at dawn and is different than a duet call. They are also known to include loud drawn out notes.

=== Diet ===
Undocumented, but most likely it will eat a mixture of terrestrial invertebrates, seeds, and small fruits and berries. They have been seen to eat seeds from a tree. Similar species have been documented as a group to the sub-canopy type foragers.

=== Reproduction ===
Very little is documented about the nest and eggs of the Cuzco brushfinch. It is presumed that the nest is a cup. This species is seen very actively breeding at altitudes of 2,300 to 3,600 m (7,500 to 11,800 ft), meaning that they probably stay in their normal habitat for this.
