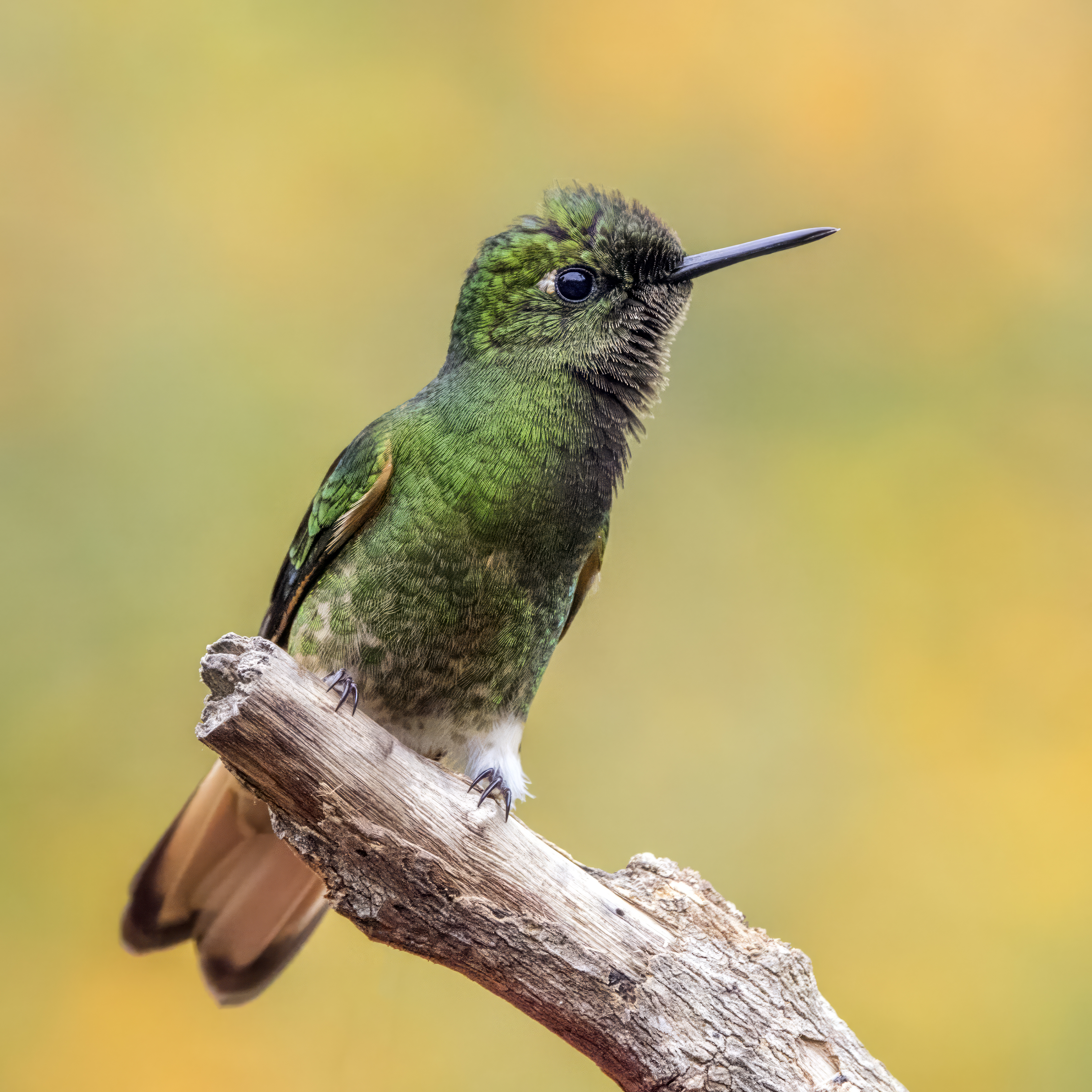
- Boissonneaua flavescens flavescens, Colombia

Conservation status
- Least Concern (IUCN 3.1)
- CITES Appendix II

Scientific classification
- Kingdom: Animalia
- Phylum: Chordata
- Class: Aves
- Order: Apodiformes
- Family: Trochilidae
- Genus: Boissonneaua
- Species: B. flavescens

Binomial name
- Boissonneaua flavescens (Loddiges, 1832)

= Buff-tailed coronet =

Species of hummingbird

The buff-tailed coronet (Boissonneaua flavescens) is a species of hummingbird in the 'Brilliants' tribe Heliantheini, within the subfamily Lesbiinae. It is found in Colombia, Ecuador, and Venezuela.

== Taxonomy and systematics ==
The buff-tailed coronet shares genus Boissonneaua with two other coronets, the chestnut-breasted (B. matthewsii) and velvet-purple (B. jardini). It has two subspecies, the nominate B. f. flavescens and B. f. tinochlora.

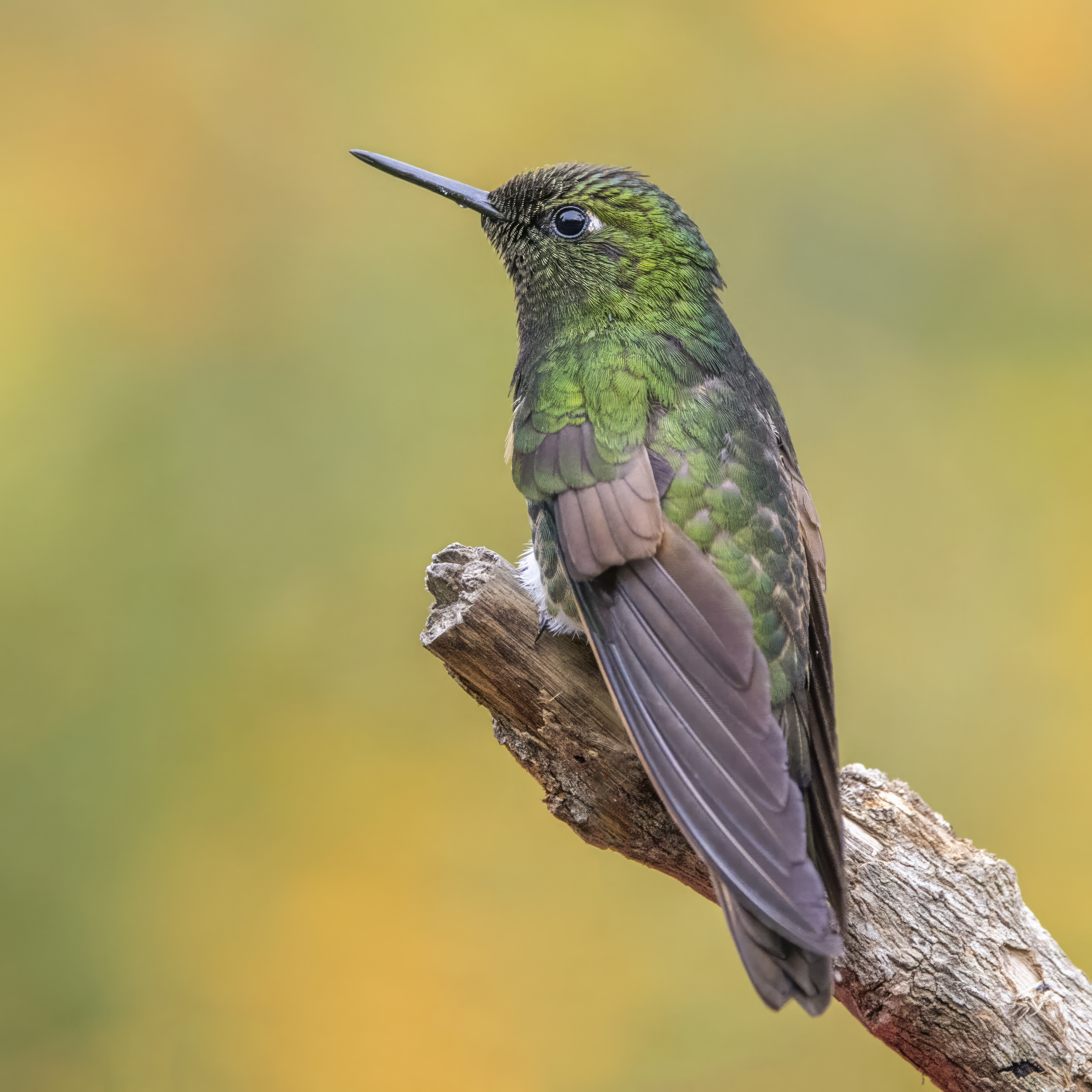
B. f. flavescens
Colombia

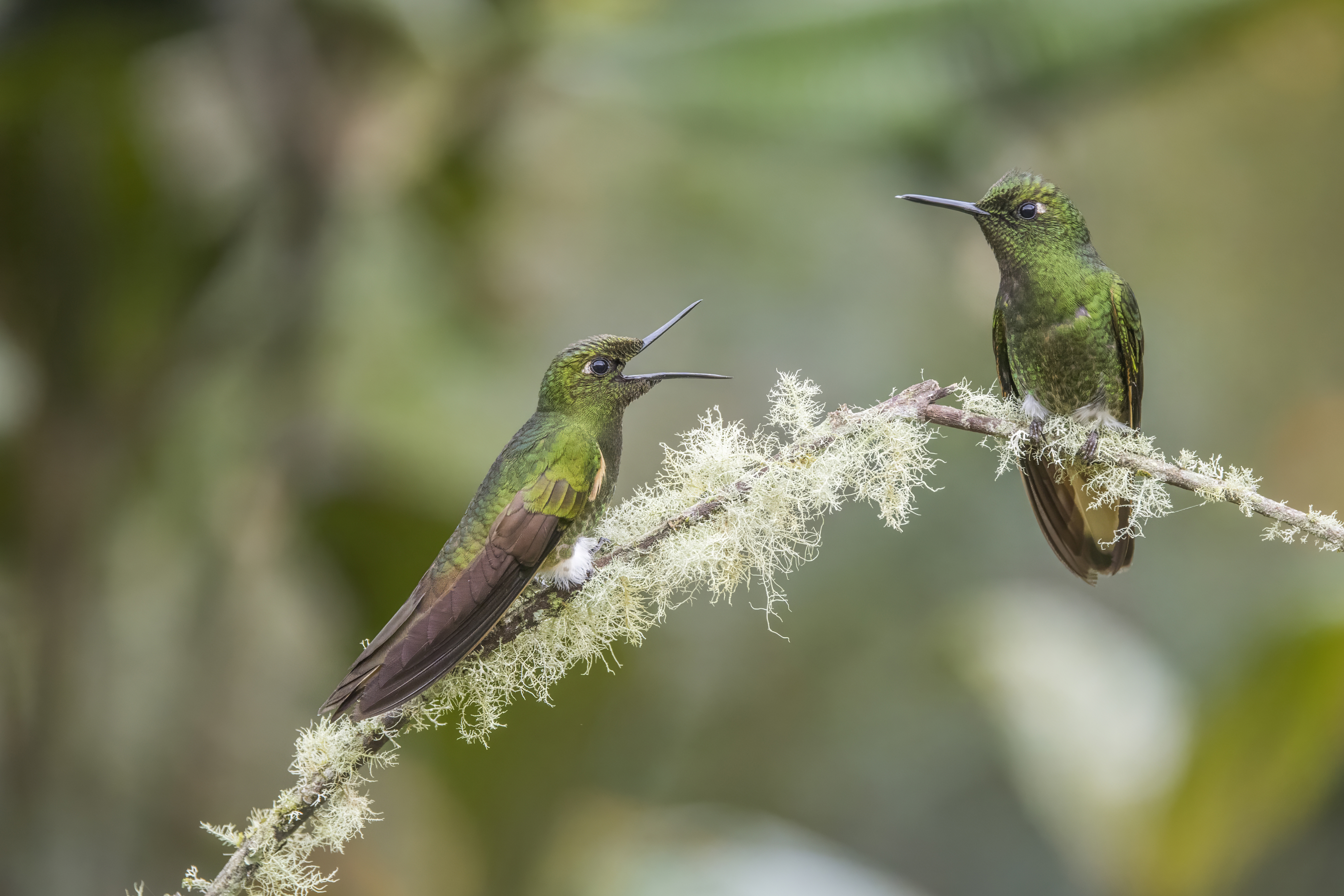
B. f. flavescens
Colombia

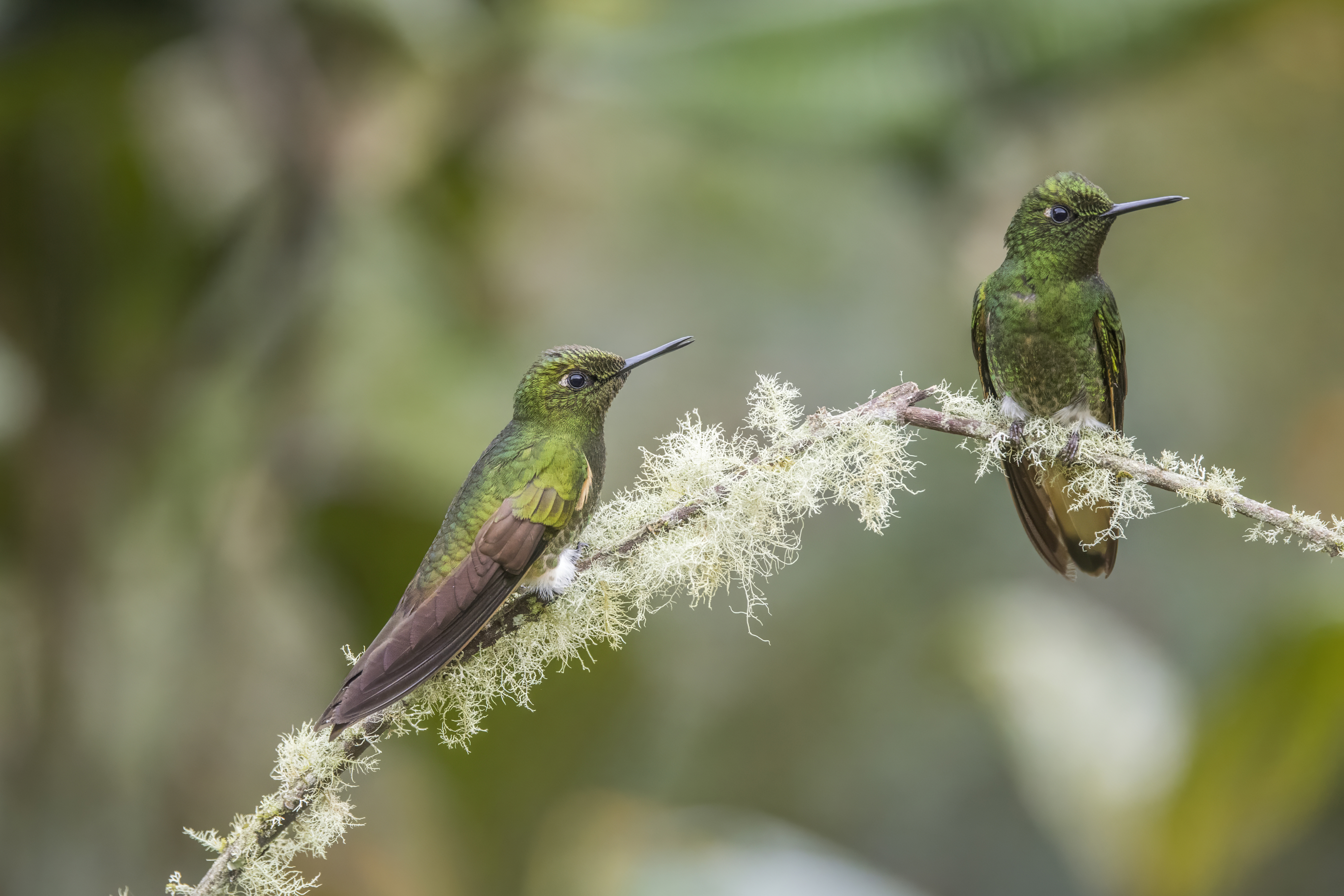
B. f. flavescens
Colombia

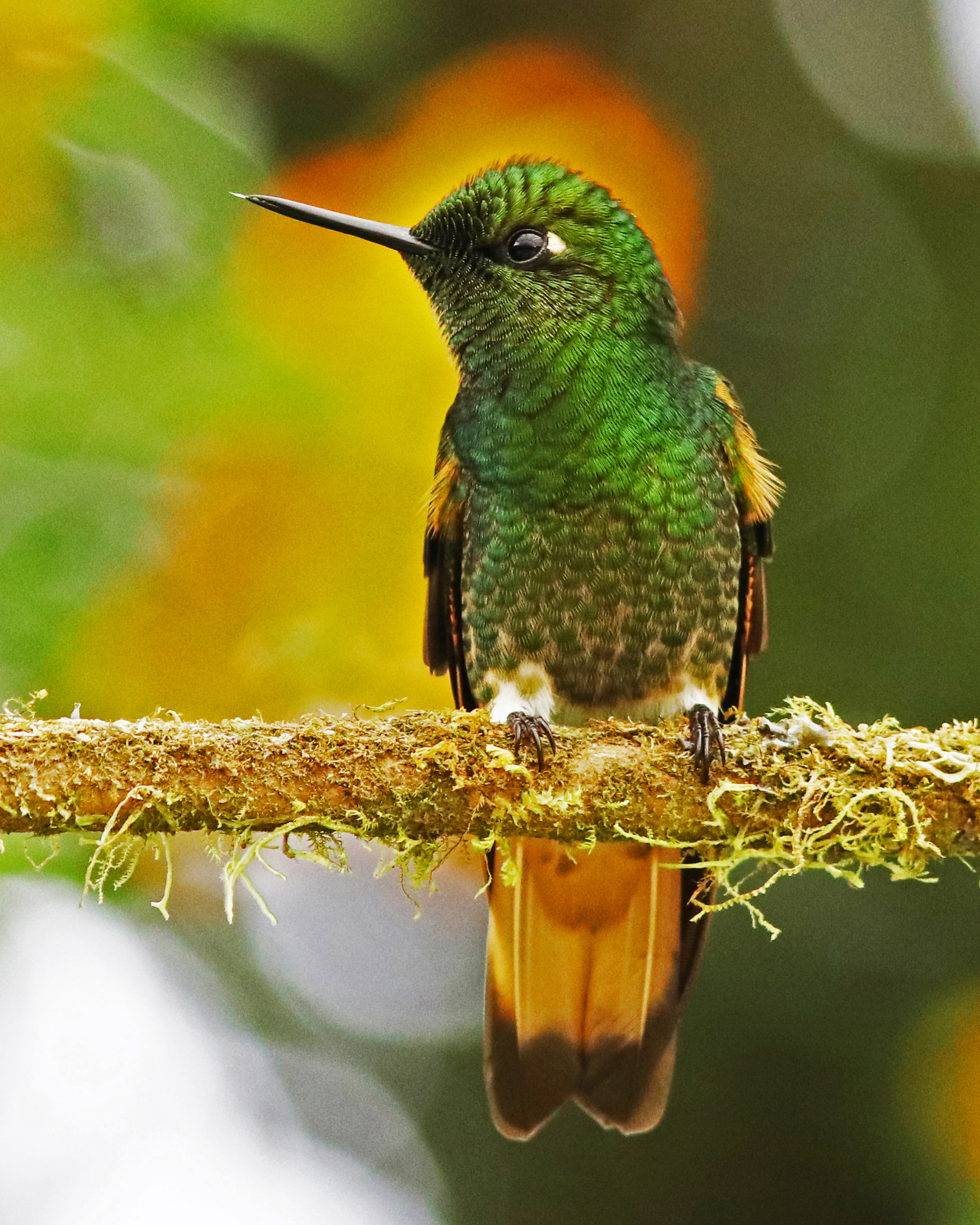
B. f. tinochlora
Ecuador

== Description ==
The buff-tailed coronet is 11 to 12 cm (4.3 to 4.7 in) long and weighs 7.3 to 8.8 g (0.26 to 0.31 oz). Both sexes have a short, straight, black bill and a small white spot behind the eye. Males of the nominate subspecies are mostly shining green, with a buff belly accented by green spots. The underwing coverts are cinnamon and show in flight. The central tail feathers are bronzy and the rest are buff with bronze tips and edges. It has small white tufts on the legs. The nominate female has more buff on the underparts and the bronze of the tail is less extensive. The buff parts of both sexes of B. f. tinochlora have a cinnamon cast and there is more bronze on the tail feathers' tips.

== Distribution and habitat ==
The nominate subspecies of buff-tailed coronet is found from the Andes of western Venezuela's Mérida state south and west through all three Andean ranges of Colombia. B. f. tinochlora is found from southwestern Colombia south along the west slope of the Andes as far as Cotopaxi Province in central Ecuador and also in a few places on Ecuador's eastern Andean slope. The species inhabits the interior and edges of humid to wet montane forest, cloudforest, and elfin forest. It also occurs in more open shrubby landscapes. In elevation it ranges from 2,000 to 3,500 m (6,560 to 11,480 ft).

== Behavior ==
=== Movement ===
The buff-tailed coronet is sedentary.

=== Feeding ===
The buff-tailed coronet is highly territorial, though it may share feeding at a flowering tree with other hummingbirds. It typically forages in the mid-story but also feeds in the canopy. Its main nectar sources are in genera Cavendishia, Palicourea, Disterigma, and Huilaea. It feeds by clinging to the flower, holding its wings open for a second or two after landing. In addition to nectar, it captures small insects by hawking from a perch.

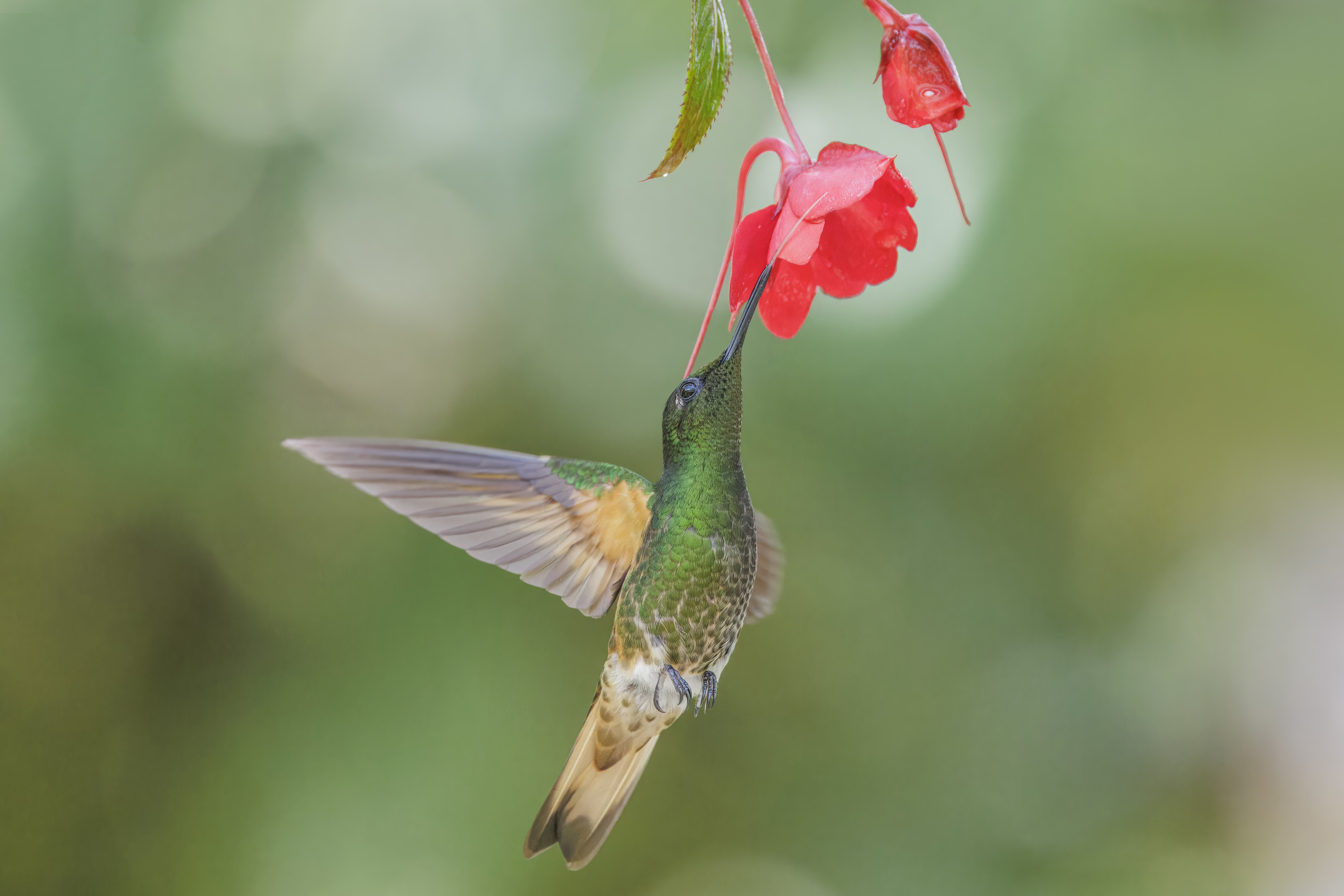
B. f. tinochlora

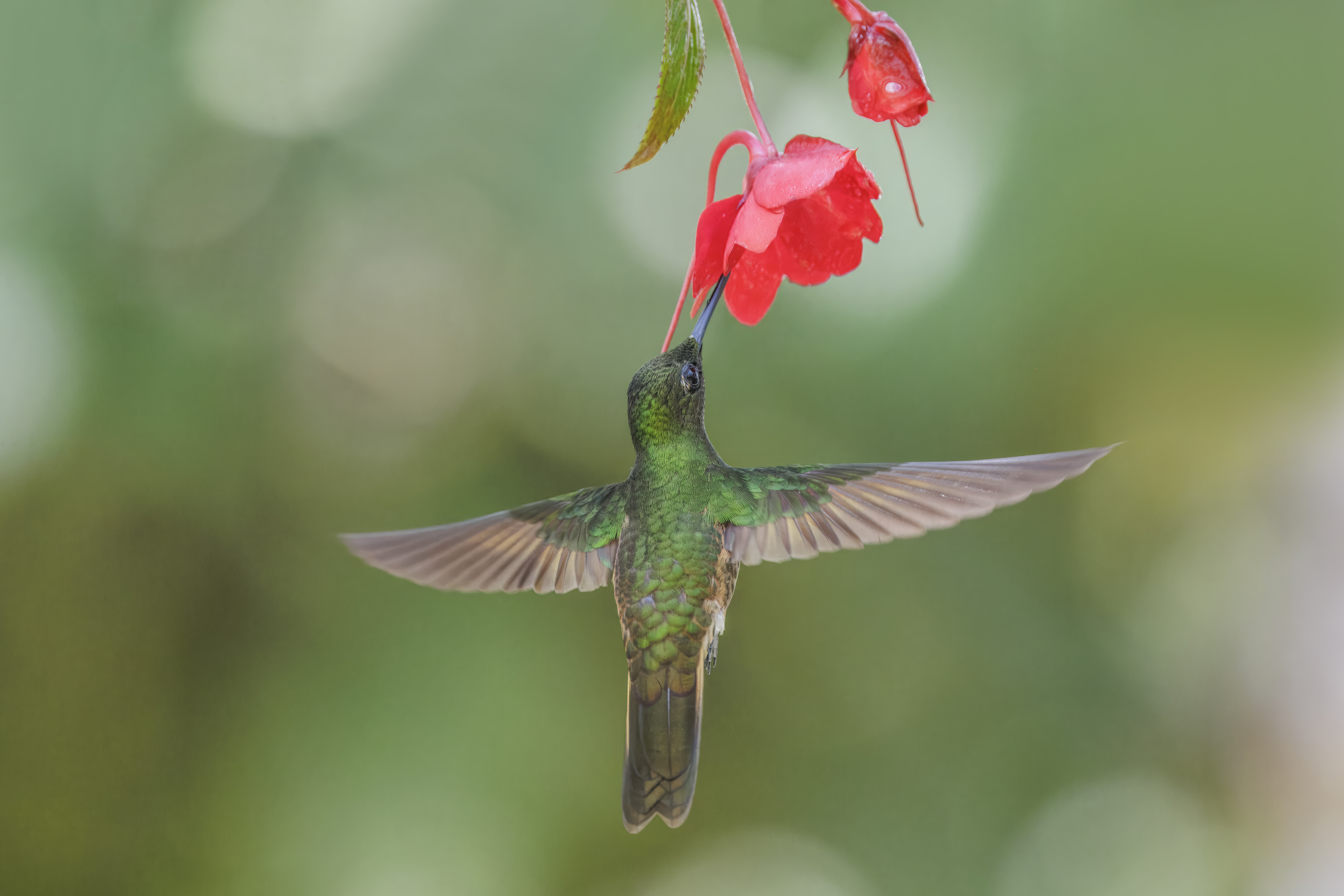
feeding

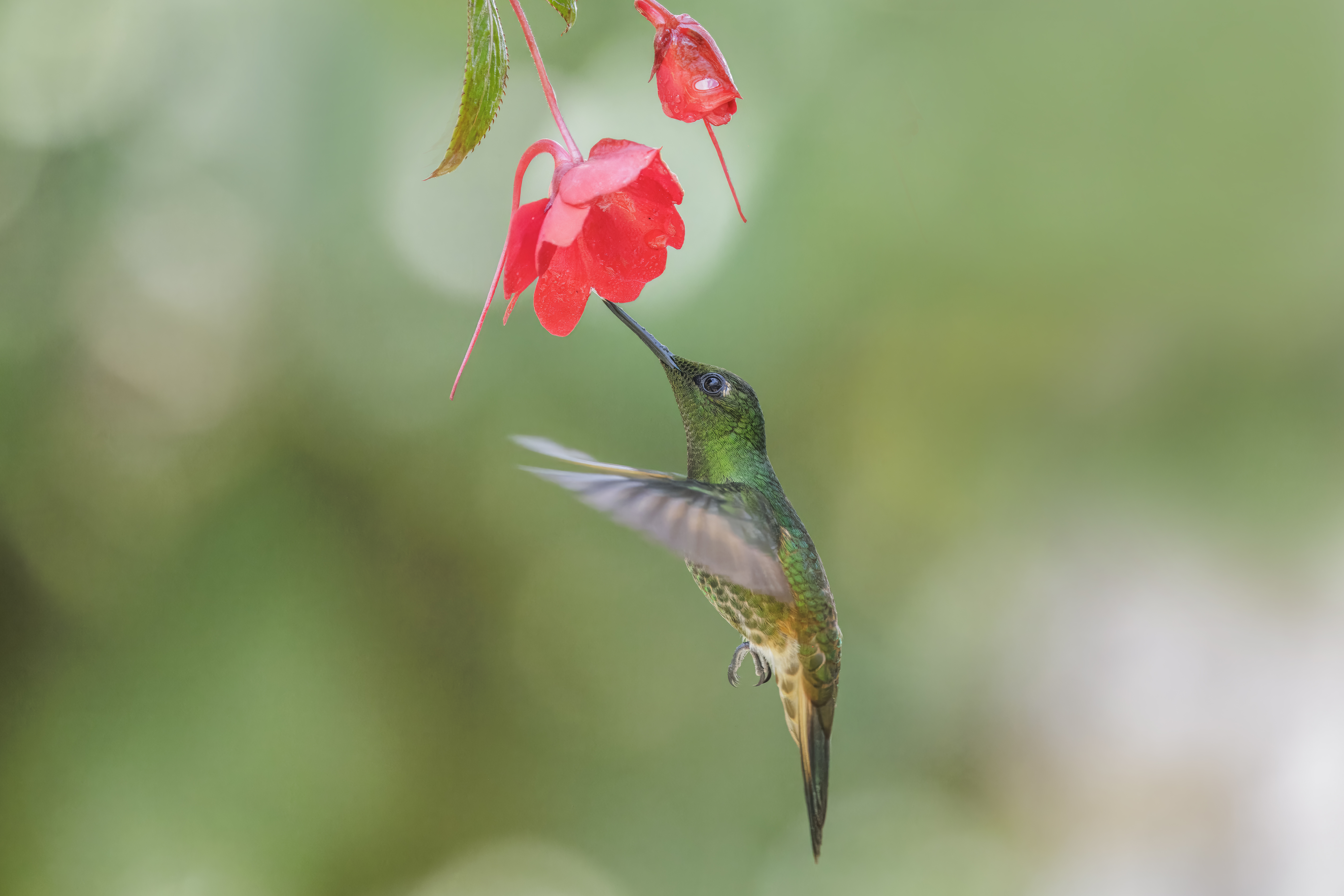
near Nanegalito, Ecuador

=== Breeding ===
Buff-tailed coronet breeding behavior has been recorded between November and March. It builds a cup nest of moss and lichen that is usually attached to a branch between 3 and 10 m (10 and 30 ft) above the ground. The female incubates the clutch of two eggs.

=== Vocalization ===
What is thought to be the buff-tailed coronet's song is "a continuous series of single high-pitched 'tsit' notes." It sometimes sings with several others of its species nearby. It also makes a "squeaky twittering, with rising piping notes and stuttering rattles," especially when interacting with other hummingbirds.

== Status ==
The IUCN has assessed the buff-tailed coronet as being of Least Concern, though its population size and trend are not known. No immediate threats have been identified. It is considered rare to locally common in different parts of its large range. It occurs in at least one protected area in Colombia.
