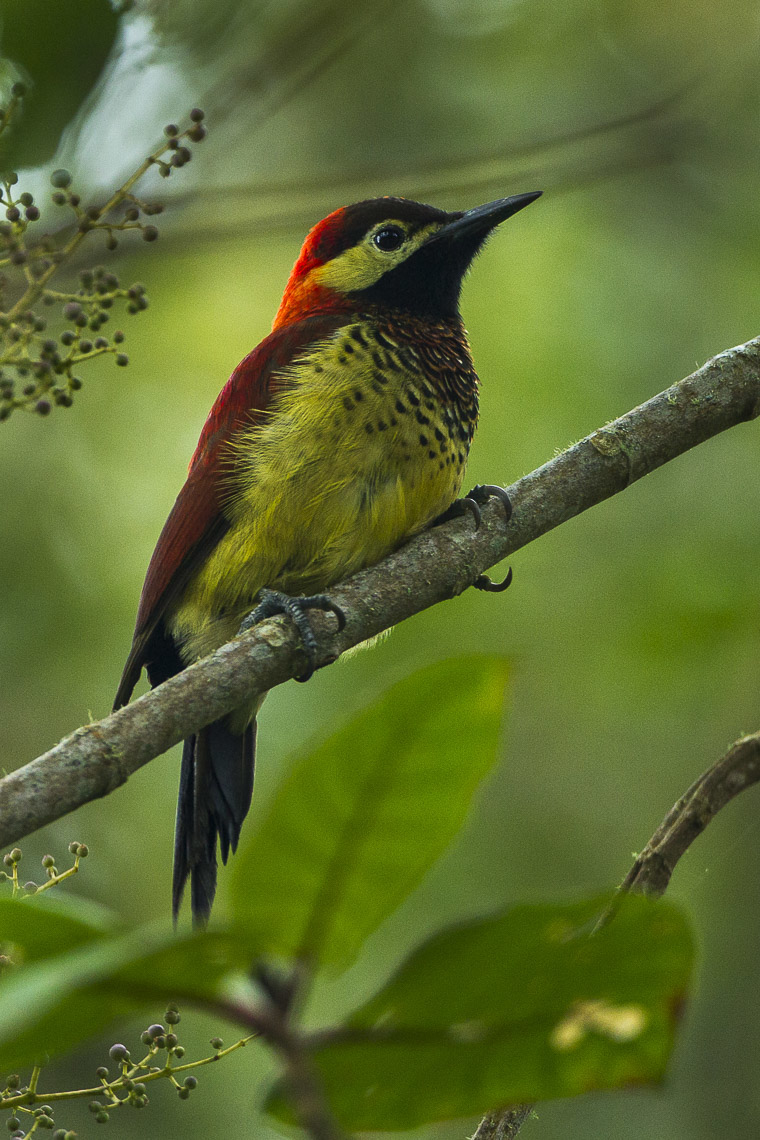

Conservation status
- Least Concern (IUCN 3.1)

- Least Concern (IUCN 3.1)

Scientific classification
- Kingdom: Animalia
- Phylum: Chordata
- Class: Aves
- Order: Piciformes
- Family: Picidae
- Genus: Colaptes
- Species: C. rivolii

Binomial name
- Colaptes rivolii (Boissonneau, 1840)
- Range of crimson-mantled woodpecker sensu stricto

Synonyms
- Picus Rivolii; Piculus rivolii

= Crimson-mantled woodpecker =

Species of bird

The crimson-mantled woodpecker (Colaptes rivolii) is a species of bird in subfamily Picinae of the woodpecker family Picidae. It is found in Bolivia, Colombia, Ecuador, Peru, and Venezuela.

== Taxonomy and systematics ==
The crimson-mantled woodpecker was originally described as Picus Rivolii. It was later placed in genus Hypoxanthus that was still later merged into Piculus; since about 2007 it has been moved into Colaptes by taxonomic systems.

The American Ornithological Society, the International Ornithological Committee, and the Clements taxonomy recognize these six subspecies of crimson-mantled woodpecker:

- C. r. quindiuna (Chapman, 1923)
- C. r. zuliensis (Aveledo & Peréz, 1989)
- C. r. rivolii (Boissonneau, 1840)
- C. r. meridae (Chapman, 1923)
- C. r. brevirostris (Taczanowski, 1874)
- C. r. atriceps (Sclater and Salvin, 1876)

BirdLife International's Handbook of the Birds of the World (HBW) treats C. r. atriceps as a separate species, the black-crowned woodpecker.

The specific epithet rivolii honors French ornithologist François Victor Masséna, third Duke of Rivoli and third Prince of Essling.

This article follows the six-subspecies model.

== Description ==
The crimson-mantled woodpecker is 23 to 26 cm (9.1 to 10 in) long and weighs 85 to 112 g (3.0 to 4.0 oz). Males and females have the same plumage except on their heads. Adult males of the nominate subspecies C. r. rivolii have a red crown. Their face is mostly pale yellow with a dark red malar stripe and a black chin and throat. Adult females have a black crown and malar stripe. Both sexes have a crimson red nape and mantle; their rump and uppertail coverts are black. Their wings are bronzy red and their tail is black. Their underparts are yellow with black and red scallops on the breast and sometimes black spots on the belly. Their bill is black, their iris red-brown to brown, and the legs pale gray. Juveniles are generally duller than adults and have no red on the breast; the male's crown is blacker.

The other subspecies of crimson-mantled woodpecker vary little from the nominate with the exception of C. r. atriceps. Males of that subspecies have a black crown that is more extensive than the female's. Both sexes have no red on the breast and their wings are less red than those of the nominate.

== Distribution and habitat ==
The subspecies of crimson-mantled woodpecker are found thus:

- C. r. quindiuna, Colombia's Cordillera Central
- C. r. zuliensis, the Serranía del Perijá on the Colombia-Venezuela border
- C. r. rivolii, Colombia's Cordillera Oriental into northwestern Venezuela
- C. r. meridae, the Andes of northwestern Venezuela between Trujillo and Táchira
- C. r. brevirostris, the Andes from southwestern Colombia south through Ecuador into central Peru
- C. r. atriceps, the Andes of southeastern Peru and western and central Bolivia (The range map omits this subspecies)

The crimson-mantled woodpecker inhabits the interior and edges of humid montane forest and the lower edge of the páramo zone. In Ecuador it mostly ranges at elevations between 2,000 and 3,300 m (6,600 and 10,800 ft).

== Behavior ==
=== Feeding ===
The crimson-mantled woodpecker forages at any level of the forest, typically on moss- and lichen-covered limbs but also on trunks. Its primary food is small arthropods, especially ants; it also feeds on fruit. It usually forages singly or in pairs, but does regularly join mixed species feeding flocks. It shuns the introduced shrub gorse.

=== Breeding ===
The crimson-mantled woodpecker's breeding season has not been defined but appears to vary geographically. One author surmised that it spans June to November in Peru and another suggested that (possibly species-wide) it includes February to March. It nests in tree cavities but nothing else is known about its breeding biology.

=== Vocal and non-vocal sounds ===
What is thought to be the song of the crimson-mantled woodpecker's most widespread subspecies brevirostris is "a series of fairly monotone, rapid metallic notes...kee'r'r-ker'r-ke'r'r. The apparent song of atriceps is a "descending low churr...grr'r'r'r'l". The species also makes "a rising REE?" call. The crimson-mantled woodpecker drums, but not frequently.

== Status ==
The IUCN follows HBW taxonomy and so has assessed the crimson-mantled sensu stricto and black-crowned woodpeckers separately. Both are rated as being of Least Concern. The population size of neither is known but both are believed to be stable. No immediate threats to either have been identified. "Human activity has little direct effect on the Crimson-mantled Woodpecker, other than the local effects of habitat destruction."
