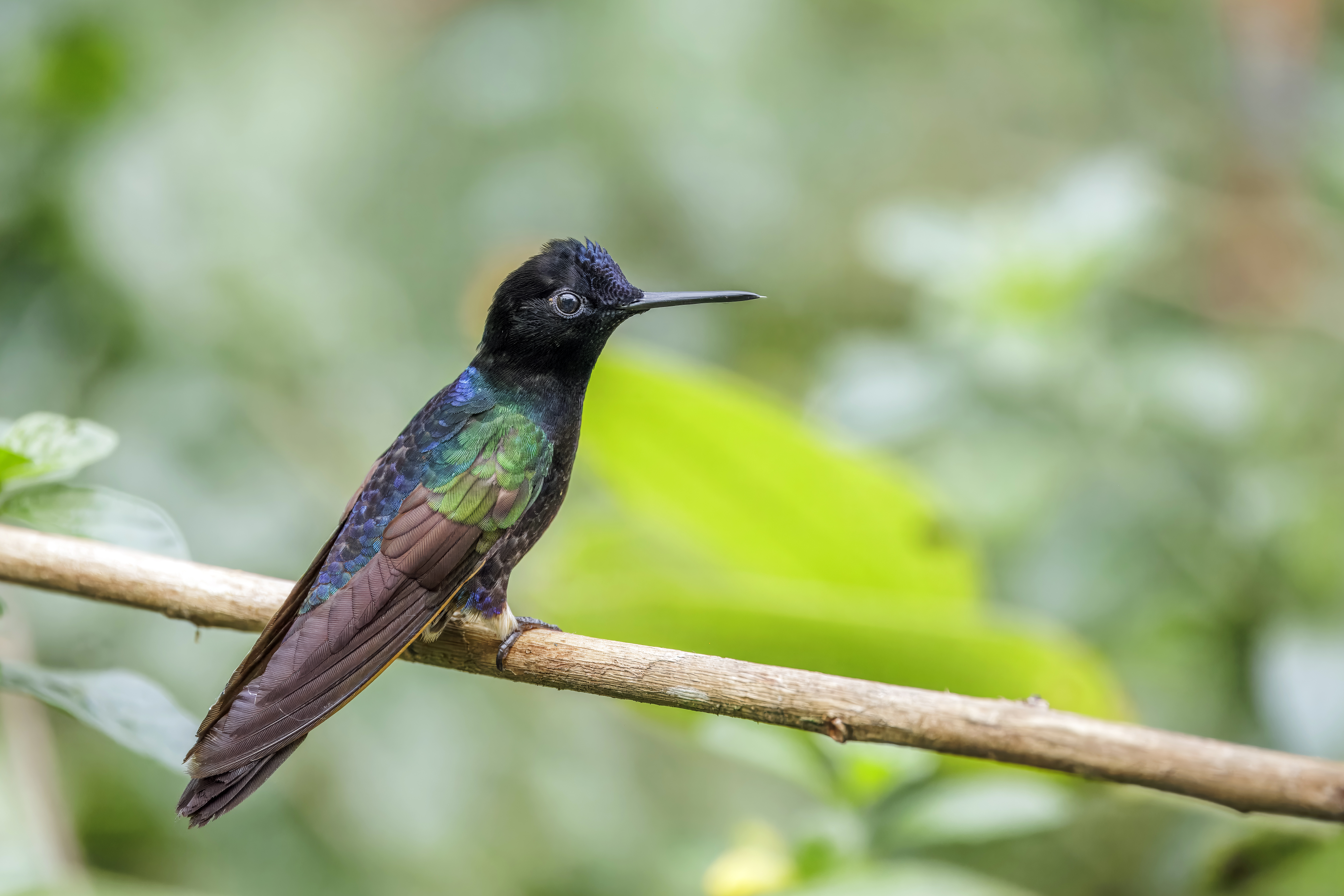
- In northwestern Ecuador

Conservation status
- Least Concern (IUCN 3.1)
- CITES Appendix II

Scientific classification
- Kingdom: Animalia
- Phylum: Chordata
- Class: Aves
- Order: Apodiformes
- Family: Trochilidae
- Genus: Boissonneaua
- Species: B. jardini

Binomial name
- Boissonneaua jardini (Bourcier, 1851)

= Velvet-purple coronet =

Species of hummingbird

The velvet-purple coronet (Boissonneaua jardini) is a species of hummingbird in the "brilliants", tribe Heliantheini in subfamily Lesbiinae. It is found in Colombia and Ecuador.

== Taxonomy and systematics ==
The velvet-purple coronet shares genus Boissonneaua with two other coronets, the chestnut-breasted (B. matthewsii) and buff-tailed (B. flavescens). It is monotypic.

== Description ==
The velvet-purple coronet is 11 to 12.7 cm (4.3 to 5.0 in) long and weighs 8.0 to 8.5 g (0.28 to 0.30 oz). Both sexes have a short, straight, black bill and a white spot behind the eye. Both have a notched tail, though the female's is less deeply indented than the male's, and both have small white puffs on the legs. Males have a velvety black head with a glittering purplish blue crown; the rest of the upperparts are shining bluish green. The throat is velvety black and the breast and belly glittering purplish blue. The underwing coverts are cinnamon and show in flight. The central tail feathers are black and the rest white with black tips and edges. Females are similar to males but duller overall, and the breast and belly feathers have buff to grayish brown fringes.

== Distribution and habitat ==
The velvet-purple coronet is found along the Pacific slope of the Andes from southwestern Colombia's Chocó Department to northwestern Ecuador's Pichincha Province. It mostly inhabits the interior and edges of wet mossy primary and secondary forest, but also occurs in shrubby landscapes. It has been recorded between 800 and 1,700 m (2,600 and 5,600 ft) in Ecuador and between 350 and 2,200 m (1,150 and 7,220 ft) in Colombia, but is most common above 1,200 m (3,900 ft).

== Behavior ==
=== Movement ===
The velvet-purple coronet is generally sedentary, but seasonal elevational movements are known from Colombia.

=== Feeding ===
The velvet-purple coronet is territorial and defends clusters of flowers from other nectar-feeding birds. It forages at any forest level from the lower strata to the canopy. It feeds by clinging to the flower, holding its wings open for a second or two after landing. In addition to feeding on nectar it captures small insects by hawking from a perch.

=== Breeding ===
The velvet-purple coronet's breeding season spans at least from January to March but might extend as far as September. It builds a cup nest of moss and lichen on a horizontal branch or in a small fork. The female incubates the clutch of two eggs. The incubation period and time to fledging are not known.

=== Vocalization ===
The velvet-purple coronet's courtship song is described as a "series of alternating harsh and soft whistles, 'si, siii, si, siii, si, siii...'".

== Status ==
The IUCN has assessed the velvet-purple coronet as being of Least Concern, though it has a somewhat restricted range and its population size is not known and thought to be decreasing. It is considered uncommon and very local.

== Gallery ==
in the Ecuadorian Chocó cloudforest

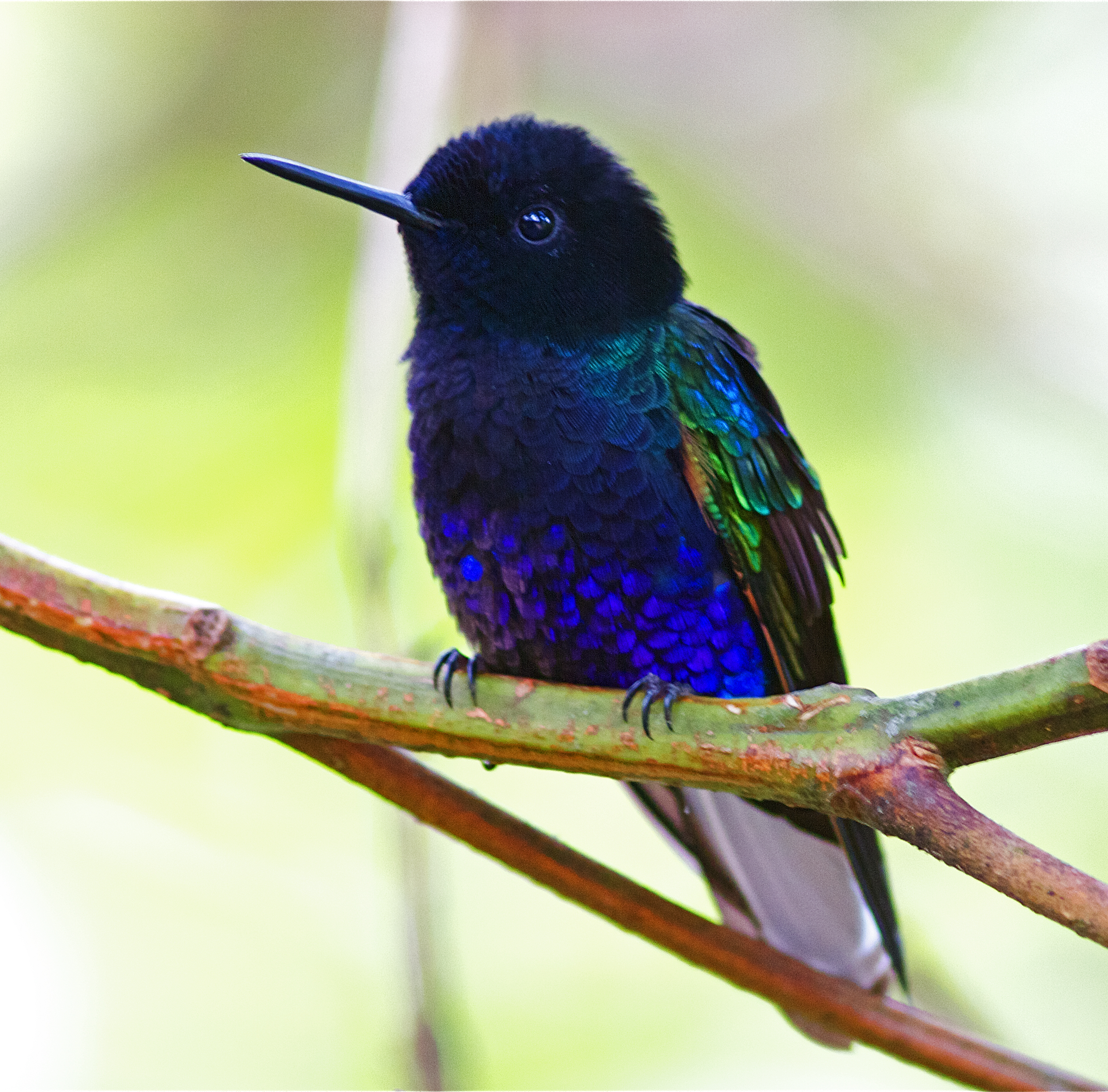

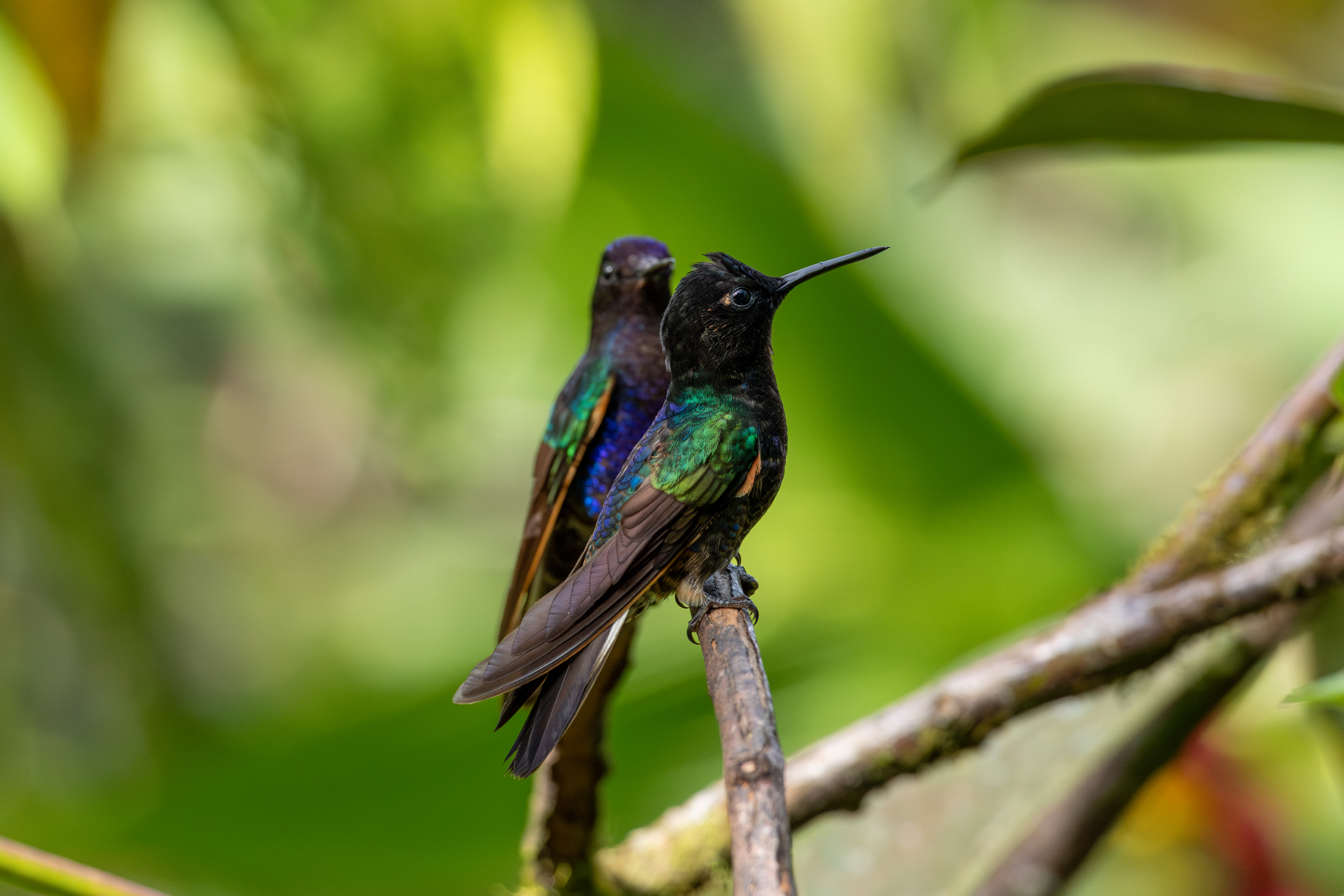
Pair of Velvet-purple coronets

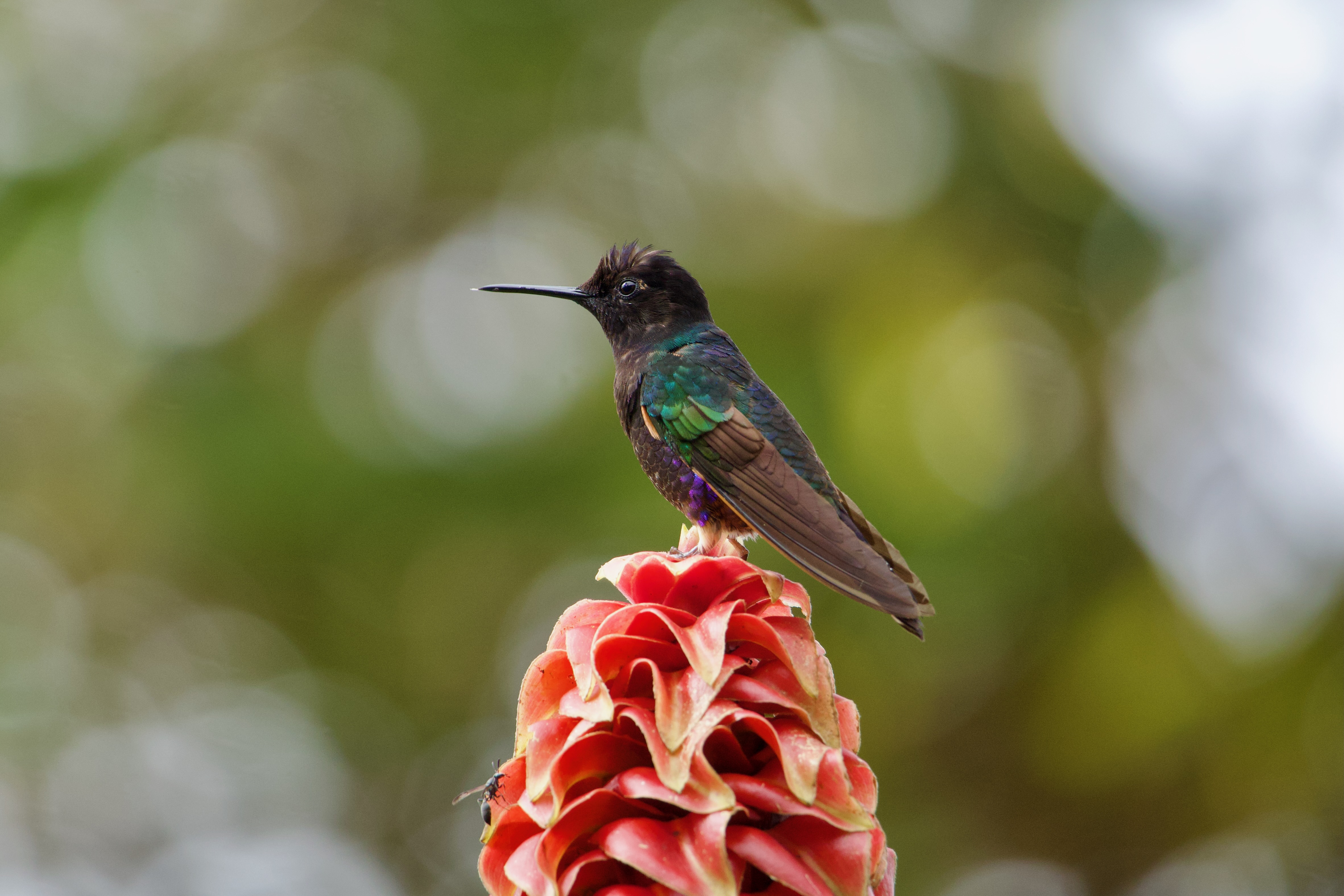
in Pichincha Province, Ecuador
