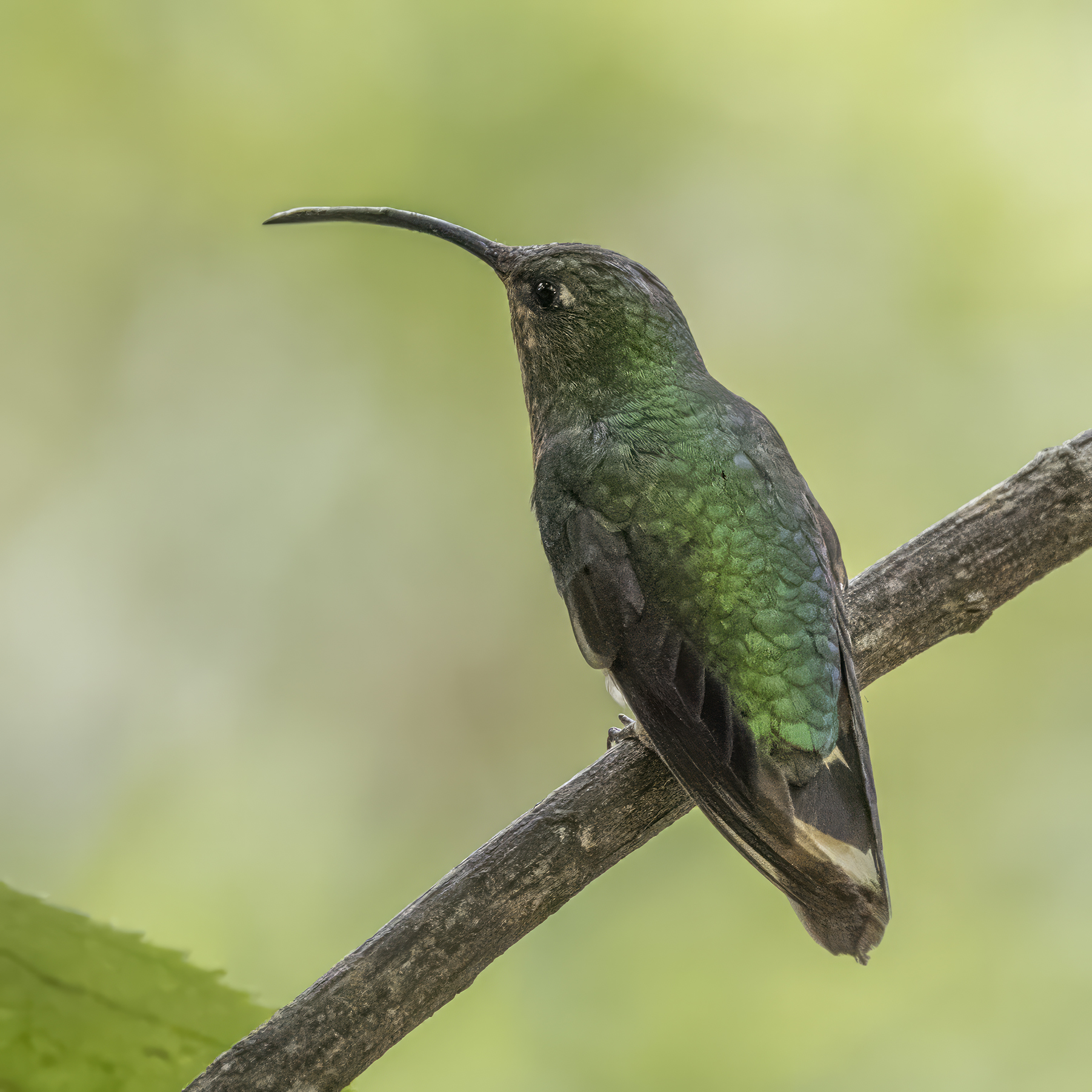
- Male
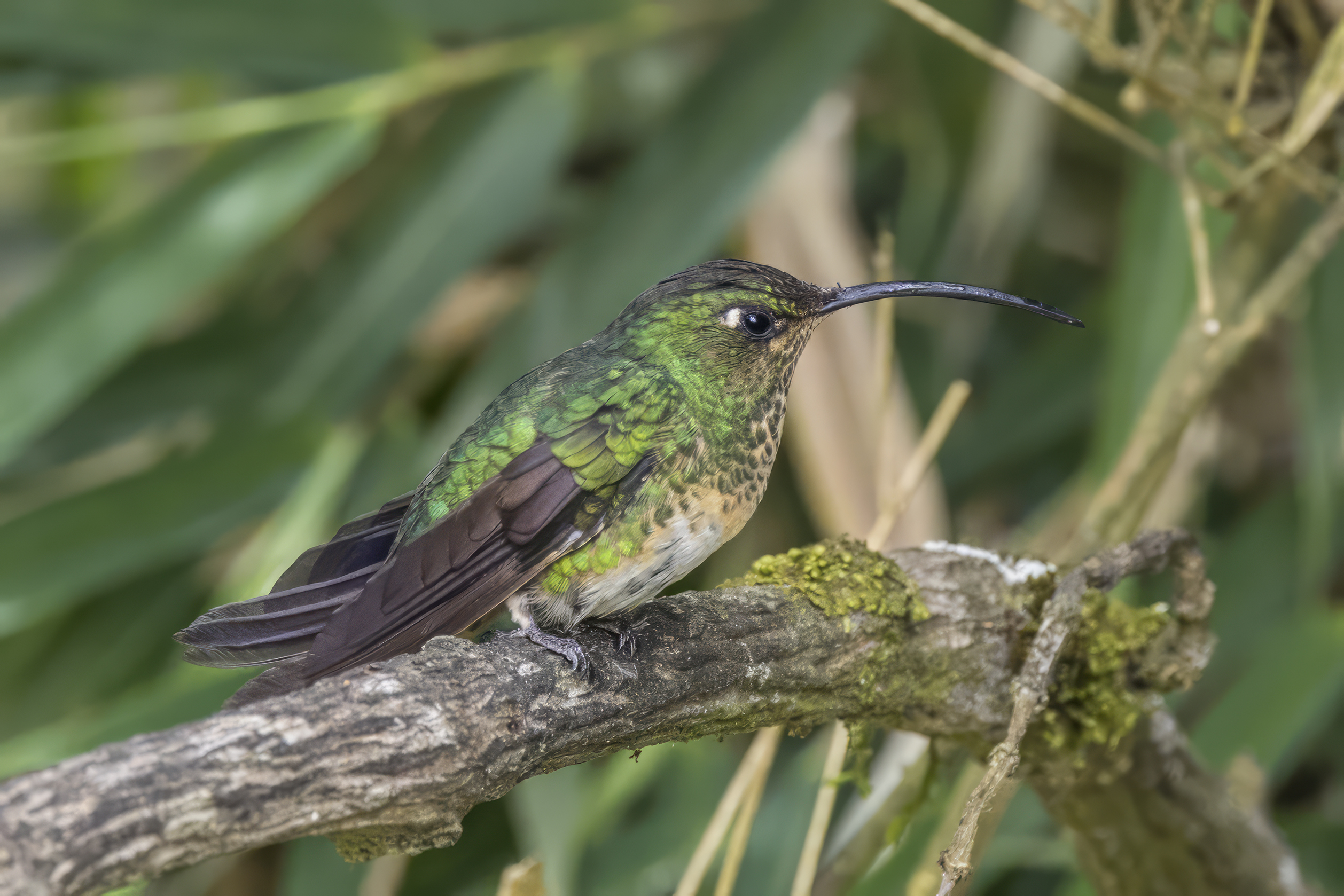
- Female both L. l. longirostris in Colombia

Conservation status
- Least Concern (IUCN 3.1)
- CITES Appendix II

Scientific classification
- Kingdom: Animalia
- Phylum: Chordata
- Class: Aves
- Order: Apodiformes
- Family: Trochilidae
- Tribe: Heliantheini
- Genus: Lafresnaya; Bonaparte, 1850
- Species: L. lafresnayi

Binomial name
- Lafresnaya lafresnayi (Boissonneau, 1840)

= Mountain velvetbreast =

Species of hummingbird

The mountain velvetbreast (Lafresnaya lafresnayi) is a species of hummingbird in the "brilliants", tribe Heliantheini in subfamily Lesbiinae. It is found in Colombia, Ecuador, Peru, and Venezuela.

== Taxonomy and systematics ==
The mountain velvetbreast is the only member of its genus. Seven subspecies are recognized:

- L. l. liriope Bangs (1910)
- L. l. longirostris Schuchmann, Weller & Wulfmeyer (2003)
- L. l. greenewalti Phelps & Phelps Jr (1961)
- L. l. lafresnayi Boissonneau (1840)
- L. l. saul Delattre & Bourcier (1846)
- L. l. orestes Zimmer, JT (1951)
- L. l. rectirostris Berlepsch & Stolzmann (1902)
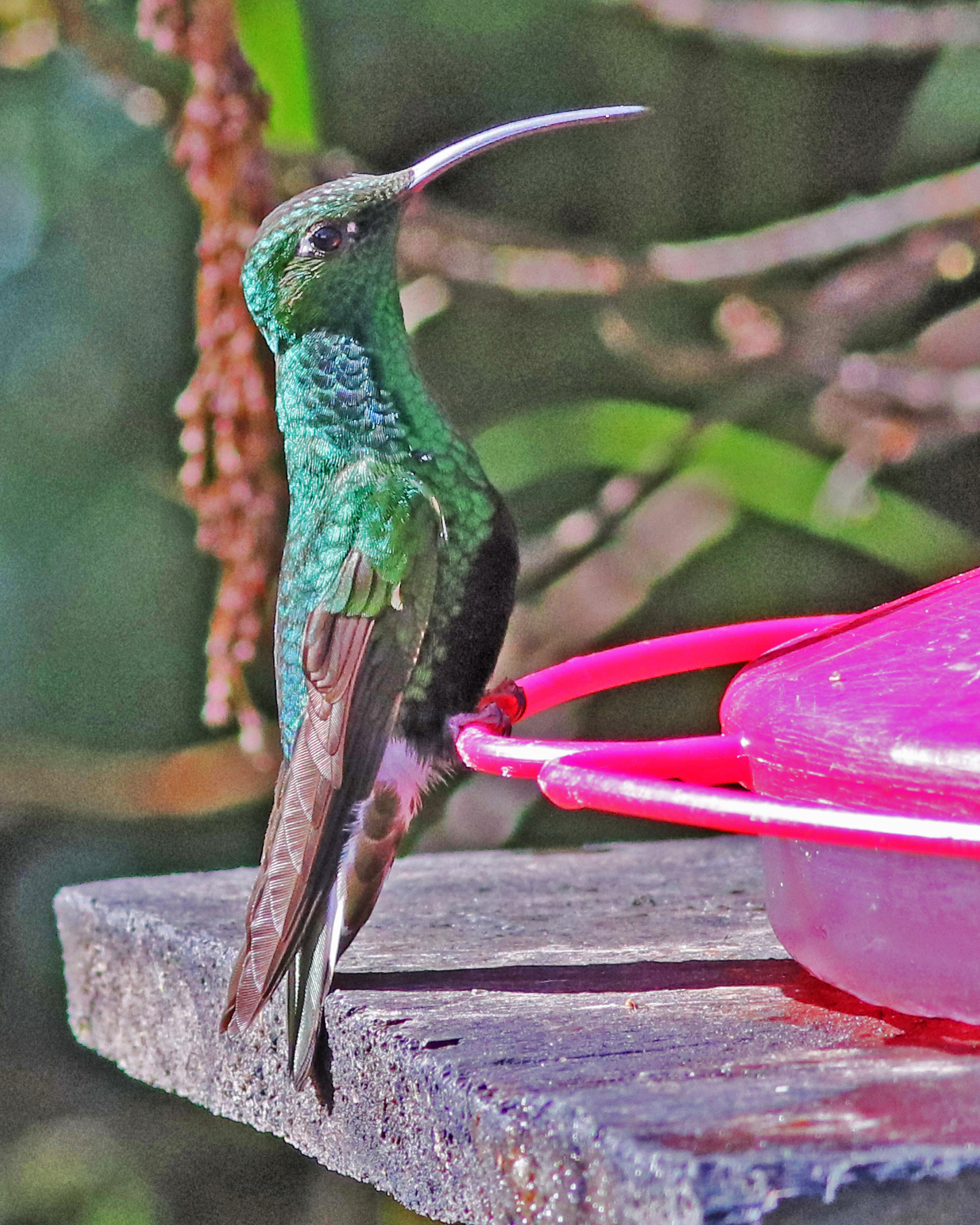
male showing its black belly

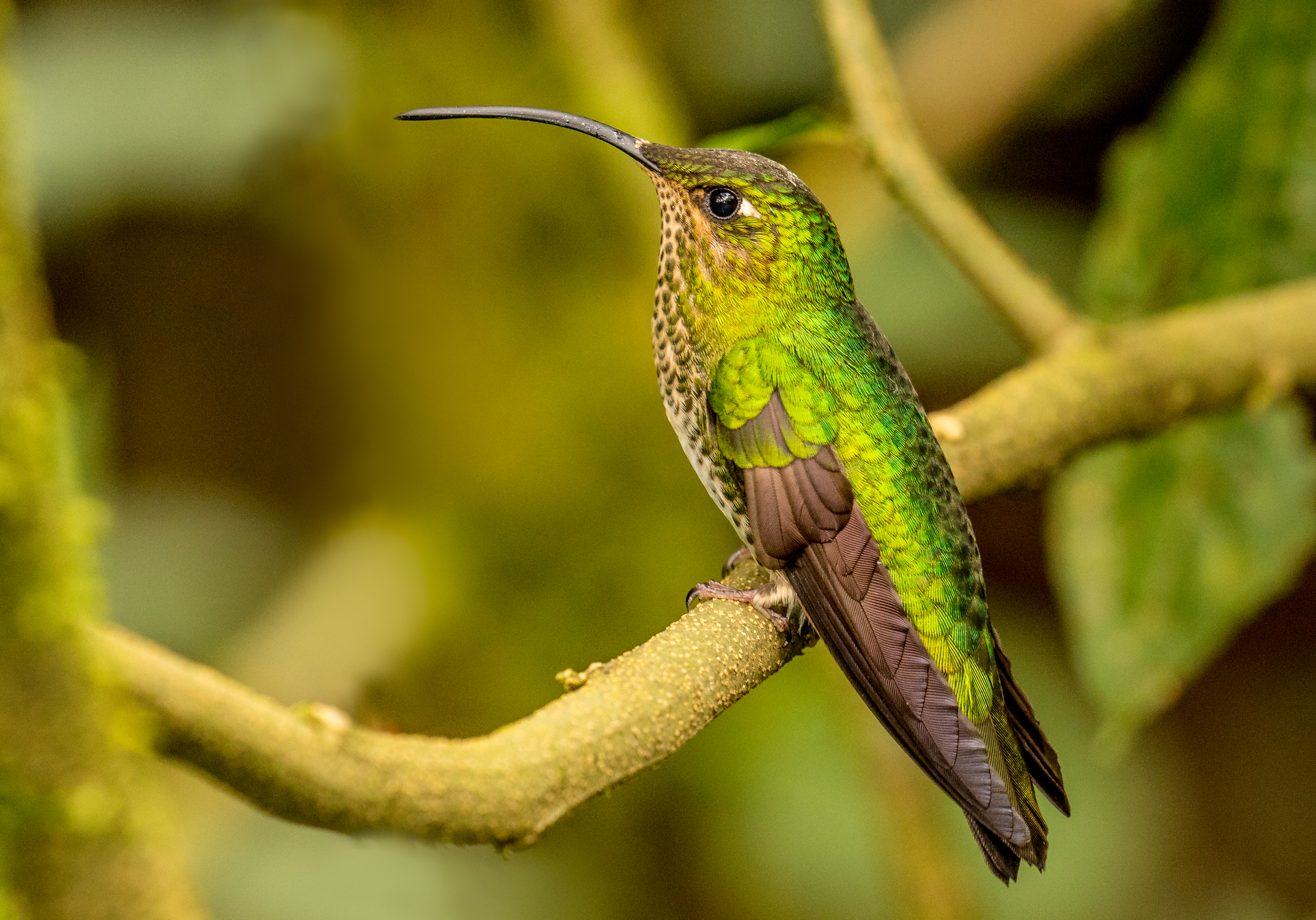
L. l. saul, Ecuador

In the early 20th century at least one author treated L. l. liriope and L. l. saul as separate species.

== Description ==
The mountain velvetbreast is 11.5 to 12 cm (4.5 to 4.7 in) long including its 2.7 to 3.2 cm (1.1 to 1.3 in) bill. It weighs 4.5 to 6.3 g (0.16 to 0.22 oz). Males have a thin decurved black bill whose length and curvature vary among the subspecies. The female's bill is less curved than the male's and also varies geographically. All subspecies have a white spot behind the eye.

Adult males of the nominate subspecies L. l. lafresnayi have grass green upperparts. Their throat and breast are iridescent emerald green and the belly velvet black. The central tail feathers are bronzy green and the rest buff with black tips. Adult females also have grass green upperparts. Their underparts are buff with iridescent green spots. Juveniles are similar to females but that females have the beginning of the black belly.

Males of the other subspecies have whitish, not buff, outer tail feathers, and females have white underparts rather than the nominate's buff. Most of the subspecies have minor differences in bill length and curvature from the nominate, but that of subspecies L. l. saul is more decurved and that of L. l. orestes is even more decurved. The most recently described subspecies, L. l. longirostris, has the longest bill of all, though its curvature is only slightly more than that of the nominate.

The subspecies also differ somewhat in plumage. L. l. liriope has coppery green central tail feathers. L. l. greenewalti is similar to the nominate but paler and more yellowish green. L. l. longirostris has less coppery inner tail feathers than liriope and is unique among the subspecies with horn- to buff-colored outer tail feathers. L. l. saul has white outer tail feathers with greenish bronze tips. L. l. orestes differs from the nominate only in its greatly decurved bill and white outer tail feathers. L. l. rectirostris has a wide black band at the end of its tail feathers.

== Distribution and habitat ==
The subspecies of mountain velvetbreast are found thus:

- L. l. liriope, the isolated Sierra Nevada de Santa Marta in northern Colombia
- L. l. longirostris, the northern part of Colombia's Central Andes
- L. l. greenewalti, the western Venezuelan states of Trujillo, Mérida, and Táchira
- L. l. lafresnayi, extreme southwestern Andes of Venezuela and Colombia's Eastern Andes
- L. l. saul, from the Andes of southwestern Colombia south through Ecuador into extreme northern Peru
- L. l. orestes, the east slope of the northern Peruvian Andes south of the Marañón River
- L. l. rectirostris, the Andes of northern and central Peru

The mountain velvetbreast primarily inhabits the edges of humid montane forest and also shrubby slopes, though it uncommonly occurs within the forest. In elevation it generally ranges from 1,800 to 3,400 m (5,900 to 11,200 ft) and is most numerous between 2,000 to 2,800 m (6,600 to 9,200 ft). In Ecuador it is regularly found up to 3,500 m (11,500 ft) and locally as high as 3,700 m (12,100 ft).

== Behavior ==
=== Movement ===
The mountain velvetbreast makes seasonal movements between the lower elevation forest and the higher páramo.

=== Feeding ===
The mountain velvetbreast feeds on nectar from a variety of plants that have long tubular flowers; Those of genus Siphocampylus seem to be especially favored. Males defend feeding territories but females forage by trap-lining, visiting a circuit of feeding sites. Both sexes also capture small arthropods by gleaning from foliage and by hawking.

=== Breeding ===
The mountain velvetbreast's breeding seasons vary geographically but it apparently breeds somewhere in every month except June. It makes a bulky cup nest of moss, lichen, and spider silk. It is usually placed 1 to 3 m (3 to 10 ft) above ground in vegetation on a steep rock face or earthen bank, though sometimes on a tree trunk. The female incubates the clutch of two eggs for 16 to 19 days and fledging occurs 23 to 26 days after hatch.

=== Vocalization ===
The mountain velvetbreast's calls include "a repeated high-pitched 'tseee' or 'pseeuw', sometimes followed by a stuttering descending series", "soft 'tek' notes", and "a thin rattle".

== Status ==
The IUCN has assessed the mountain velvetbreast as being of Least Concern. It has a very large range, and though its population size is not known it is believed to be stable. It is common in the Sierra Nevada de Santa Marta, less common and patchily distributed in the Andes, and uncommon in Venezuela and Ecuador. It does occur in several protected areas in Ecuador.
