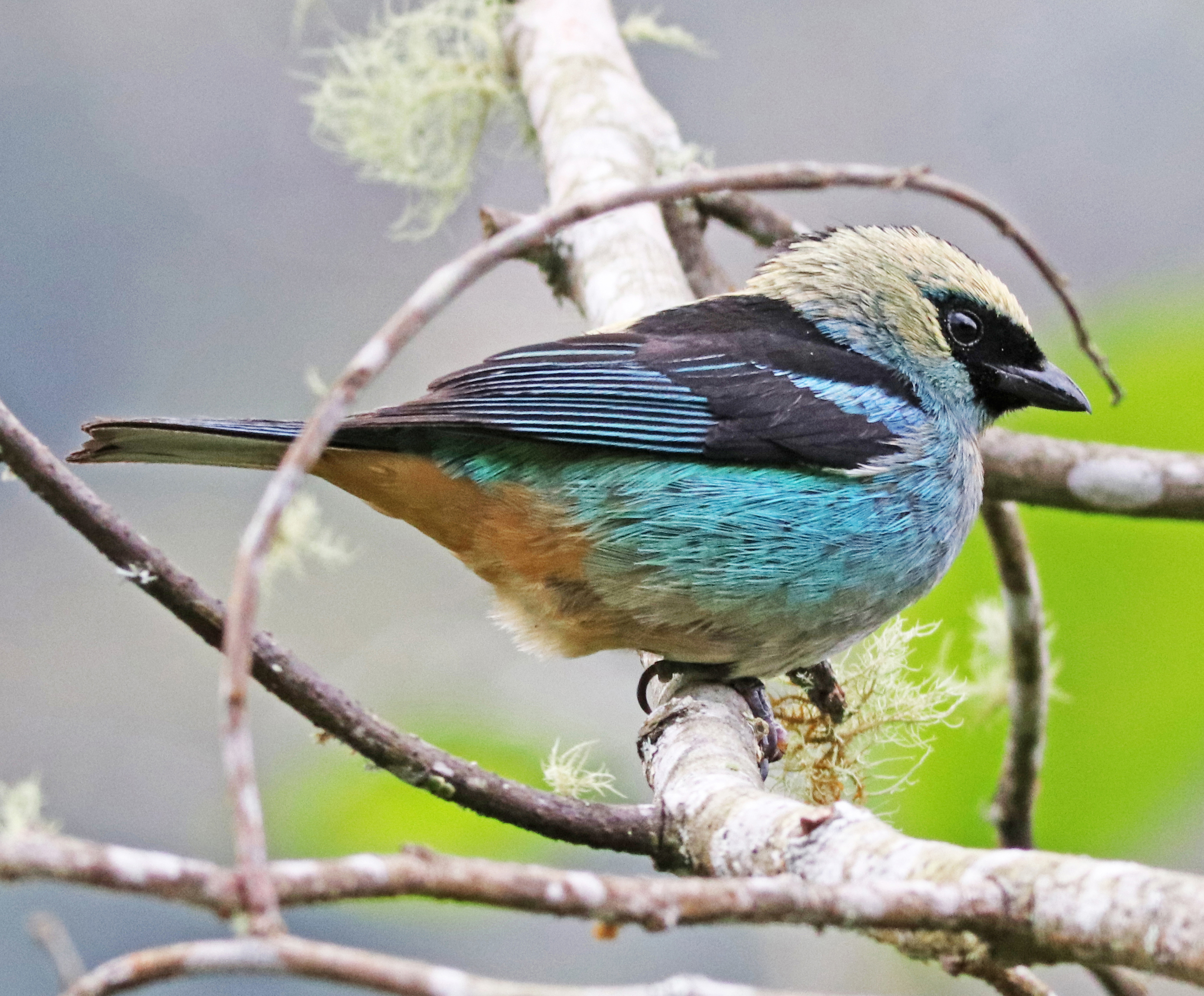
- Northwestern Ecuador

Conservation status
- Least Concern (IUCN 3.1)

Scientific classification
- Kingdom: Animalia
- Phylum: Chordata
- Class: Aves
- Order: Passeriformes
- Family: Thraupidae
- Genus: Tangara
- Species: T. labradorides

Binomial name
- Tangara labradorides (Boissonneau, 1840)

= Metallic-green tanager =

Species of bird

The metallic-green tanager (Tangara labradorides) is a species of bird in the family Thraupidae. It is found in Colombia, Ecuador, and Peru. Its natural habitat is subtropical or tropical moist montane forests.

== Taxonomy and systematics ==
The blue-and-black tanager was first described as Tanagra (Aglaia) labradorides by Auguste Boissonneau in 1840 on the basis of a specimen from Santa Fe, Colombia. The generic name Tangara comes from the Tupí word tangara, meaning dancer. The specific name labradorides is from the French pierre de Labrador (feldspar), and the Ancient Greek -ides, meaning resembling, referring to the species' metallic blue-green color, which resembles that of feldspar. Metallic-green tanager is the official common name designated by the International Ornithologists' Union (IOC).

The metallic-green tanager is one of 27 species in the genus Tangara. It was previously thought to form a species group with the blue-browed and golden-naped tanagers. However, phylogenetic studies have shown that the golden-naped tanager is only distantly related to the other two species in the group. Its relation with the blue-browed tanager is also unclear, as some studies have shown the metallic-green tanager to be sister to the blue-browed tanager, but others have found this grouping to be paraphyletic.

=== Subspecies ===
There are two recognized subspecies of the metallic-green tanager. DNA studies have shown that the rate of divergence between in nucleotide sequences between the two subspecies is higher than that of several other tanagers currently recognized as distinct species.

- T. l. labradorides (Boissonneau, 1840): The nominate subspecies, it is found in western and central Colombia and western Ecuador.
- T. l. chaupensis Chapman, 1925: Found from southeastern Ecuador and northern Peru. It is similar to the nominate, but is greener in color, with a paler abdomen, no gold on the forehead, and golden-green margins on the primary flight feathers.

== Gallery ==
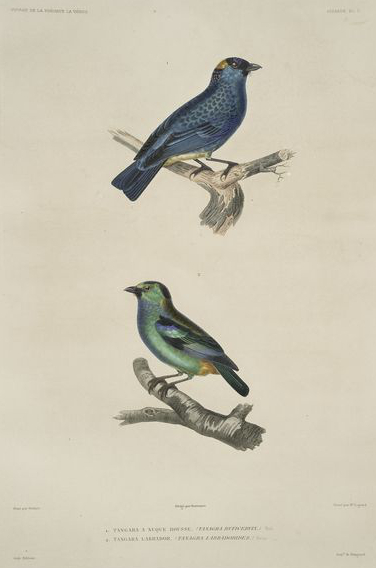
Painting of metallic-green tanager (below) with a golden-naped tanager (above)

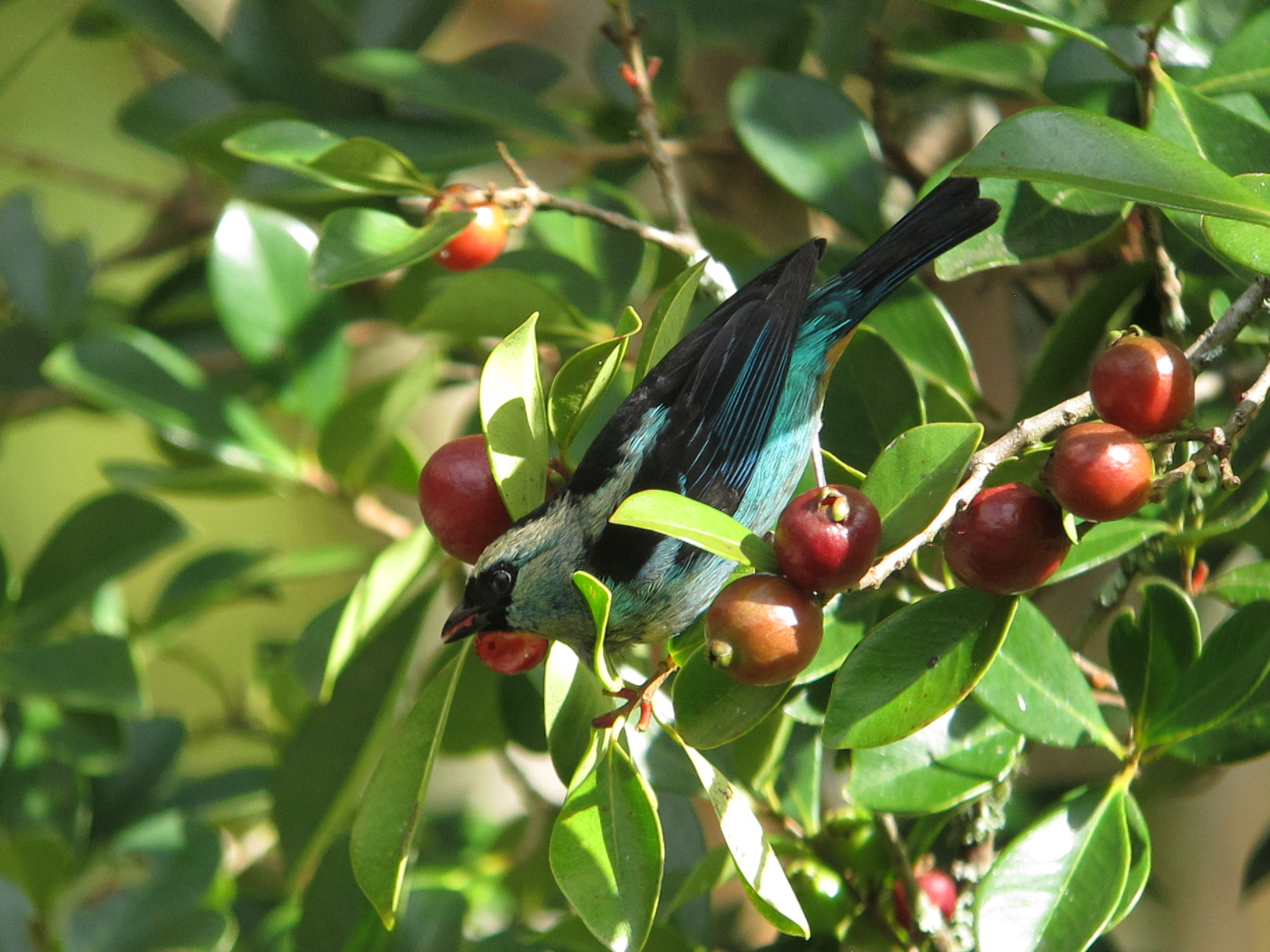
A metallic-green tanager eating fruit.
