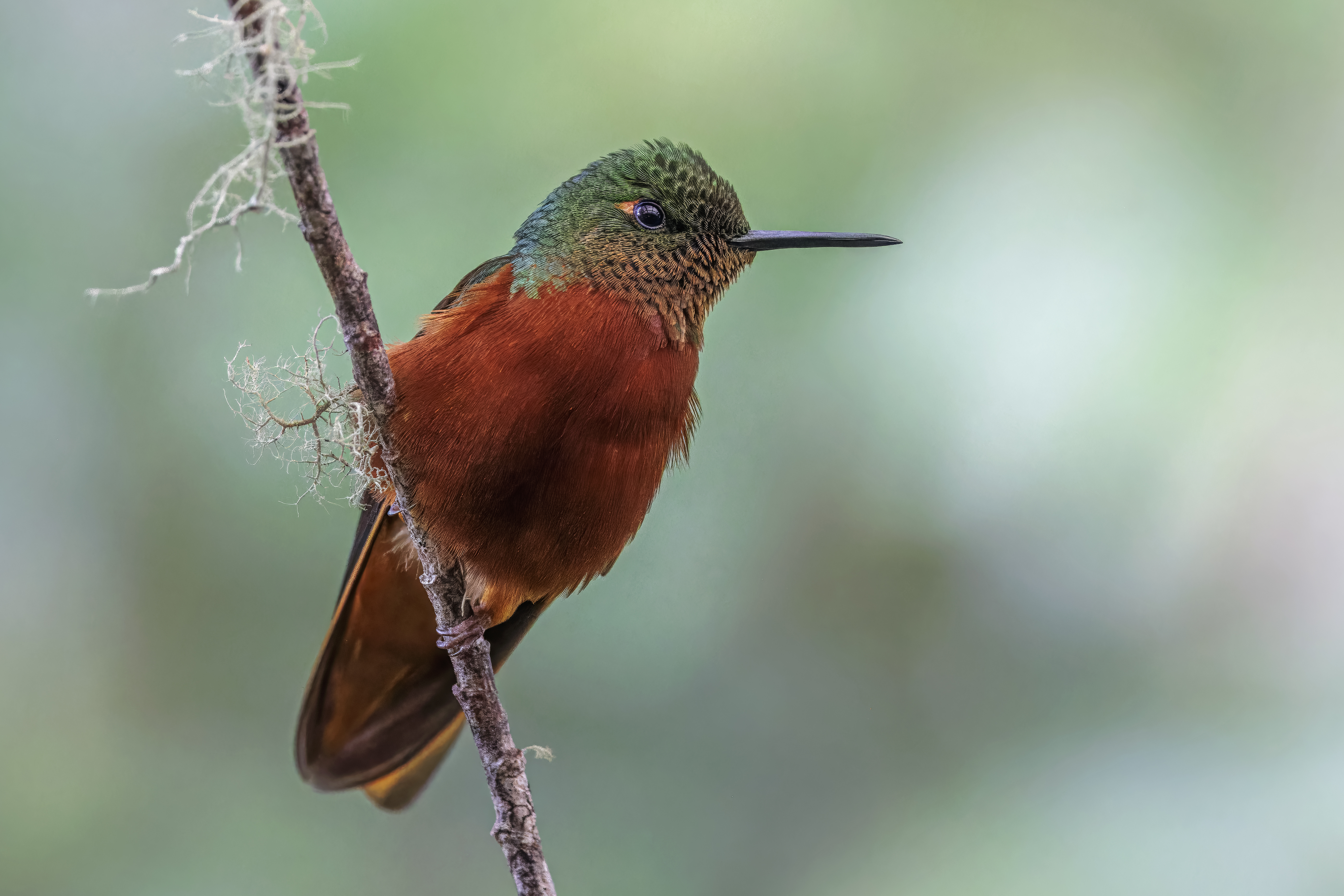
- in Ecuador

Conservation status
- Least Concern (IUCN 3.1)
- CITES Appendix II

Scientific classification
- Kingdom: Animalia
- Phylum: Chordata
- Class: Aves
- Order: Apodiformes
- Family: Trochilidae
- Genus: Boissonneaua
- Species: B. matthewsii

Binomial name
- Boissonneaua matthewsii (Bourcier, 1847)

= Chestnut-breasted coronet =

Species of hummingbird

The chestnut-breasted coronet (Boissonneaua matthewsii) is a species of hummingbird in the "brilliants", tribe Heliantheini in subfamily Lesbiinae. It is found in Colombia, Ecuador, and Peru.

== Taxonomy and systematics ==
The chestnut-breasted coronet shares genus Boissonneaua with two other coronets, the buff-tailed (B. flavescens) and velvet-purple (B. jardini). It is monotypic.

== Description ==
The chestnut-breasted coronet is 10.5 to 13 cm (4.1 to 5.1 in) long and weighs about 6.5 to 8.3 g (0.23 to 0.29 oz). Both sexes have a short, straight, black bill, a white spot behind the eye, and a notched tail. Males have metallic green upperparts. Their throat has yellowish green speckles on a buff base and the rest of the underparts are reddish chestnut with some green speckles on the flanks. The central tail feathers are bronzy and the rest reddish chestnut with bronzy tips. The female's plumage is almost identical, but with somewhat paler underparts and less speckling on the throat.

== Distribution and habitat ==
The chestnut-breasted coronet is found from extreme southeastern Colombia south along the east slope of the Andes through Ecuador and Peru as far as Cuzco Department. It also occurs on the west slope of the Andes from central Ecuador into northwestern Peru. It inhabits the interior and edges of humid montane forest and also gardens near the forest. In elevation it ranges between 1,600 and 3,300 m (5,250 and 10,830 ft) in Ecuador, though is most numerous between 1,900 and 2,700 m (6,230 and 8,860 ft). In Peru it occurs between 1,500 and 3,300 m (4,920 and 10,830 ft).

== Behavior ==
=== Movement ===
The chestnut-breasted coronet's movements, if any, have not been documented.

=== Feeding ===
The chestnut-breasted coronet is highly territorial and defends clusters of flowers from other nectar-feeding birds. It typically forages from the mid-story to the canopy. It feeds by clinging to the flower, holding its wings open for a second or two after landing. In addition to feeding on nectar it captures small insects by hawking from a perch.

=== Breeding ===
The chestnut-breasted coronet's breeding phenology has not been described. It is assumed to make a cup nest like other closely related hummingbirds.

=== Vocalization ===
One description of chestnut-breasted coronet vocalizations is "a high, thin, liquid tip, a rapid, sweet trill, and various squeaky notes."

== Status ==
The IUCN has assessed the chestnut-breasted coronet as being of Least Concern. It has a large range, but its population size and trend are not known. No immediate threats have been identified. It is considered uncommon to fairly common in Ecuador and uncommon to common in Peru. "Human activity has little short-term direct effect on Chestnut-breasted Coronet, other than the local effects of habitat destruction".
