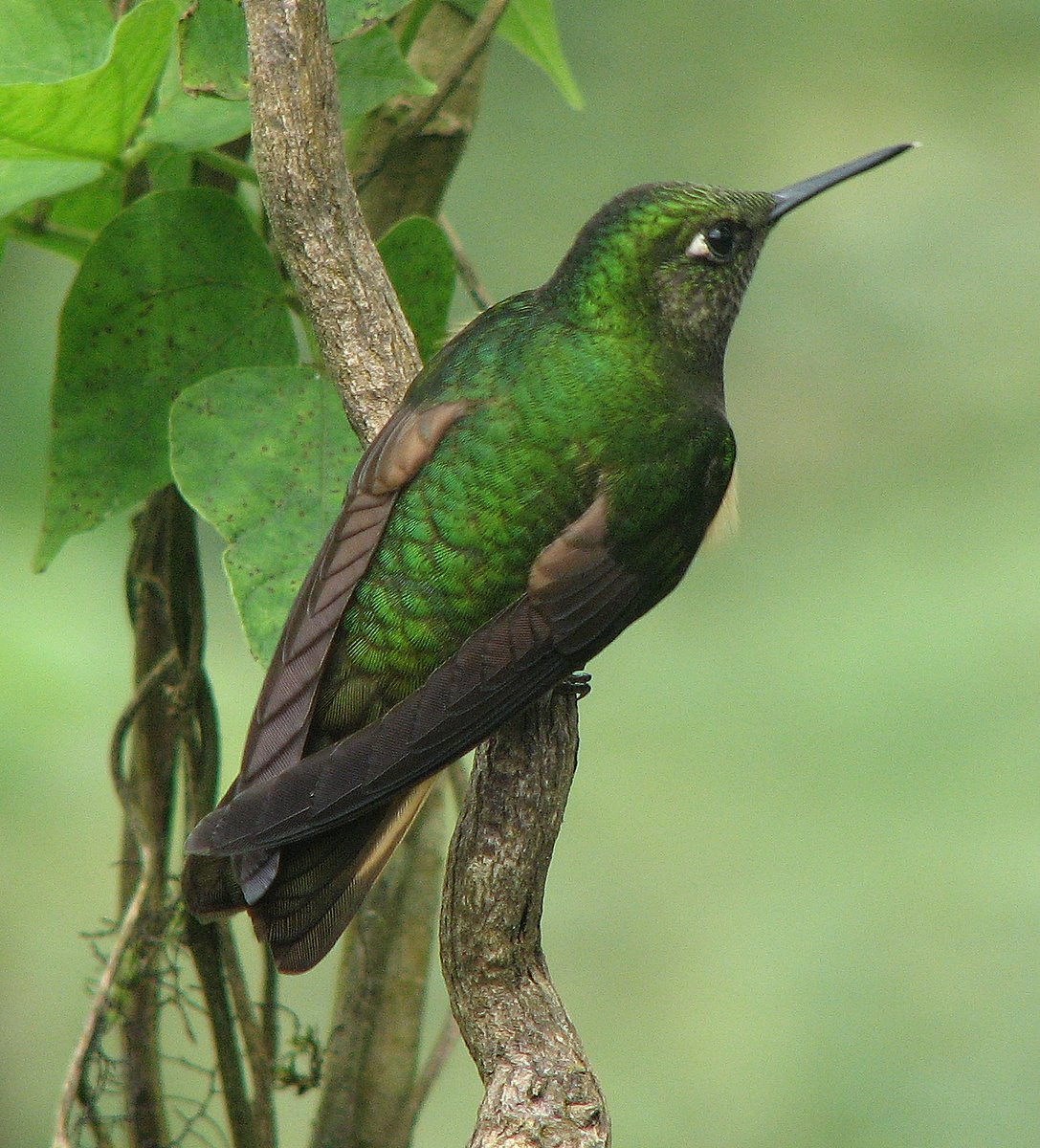
- Buff-tailed coronet, Boissonneaua flavescens

Scientific classification
- Kingdom: Animalia
- Phylum: Chordata
- Class: Aves
- Order: Apodiformes
- Family: Trochilidae
- Tribe: Heliantheini
- Genus: Boissonneaua; Reichenbach, 1854

Type species
- Trochilus flavescens Loddiges, 1832

Species
- 3, see text

= Boissonneaua =

Genus of birds

Boissonneaua is a small genus of hummingbirds in the family Trochilidae. They are found in humid Andean forests from western Venezuela to southern Peru. They have a straight black bill, contrasting outer rectrices, and a distinctive habit of quickly lifting both wings up shortly after landing, thereby revealing their rufous underwing coverts.

== Species ==
The genus contains three species:

Genus Boissonneaua – Reichenbach, 1854 – two species
Common name	Scientific name and subspecies	Range	Size and ecology	IUCN status and estimated population
Chestnut-breasted coronet	Boissonneaua matthewsii (Bourcier, 1847)	Colombia, Ecuador, and Peru.	Size: 10.5 to 13 cm (4.1 to 5.1 in) long and weighs about 6.5 to 8.3 g (0.23 to 0.29 oz) Habitat: Diet:	LC
Buff-tailed coronet	Boissonneaua flavescens (Loddiges, 1832) Two subspecies: B. f. flavescens; B. f. tinochlora	Colombia, Ecuador, and Venezuela.	Size: 11 to 12 cm (4.3 to 4.7 in) long and weighs 7.3 to 8.8 g (0.26 to 0.31 oz) Habitat: Diet:	LC
Velvet-purple coronet	Boissonneaua jardini (Bourcier, 1851)	western Colombia and north-western Ecuador.	Size: 11 to 12.7 cm (4.3 to 5.0 in) long and weighs 8.0 to 8.5 g (0.28 to 0.30 oz) Habitat: Diet:	LC
