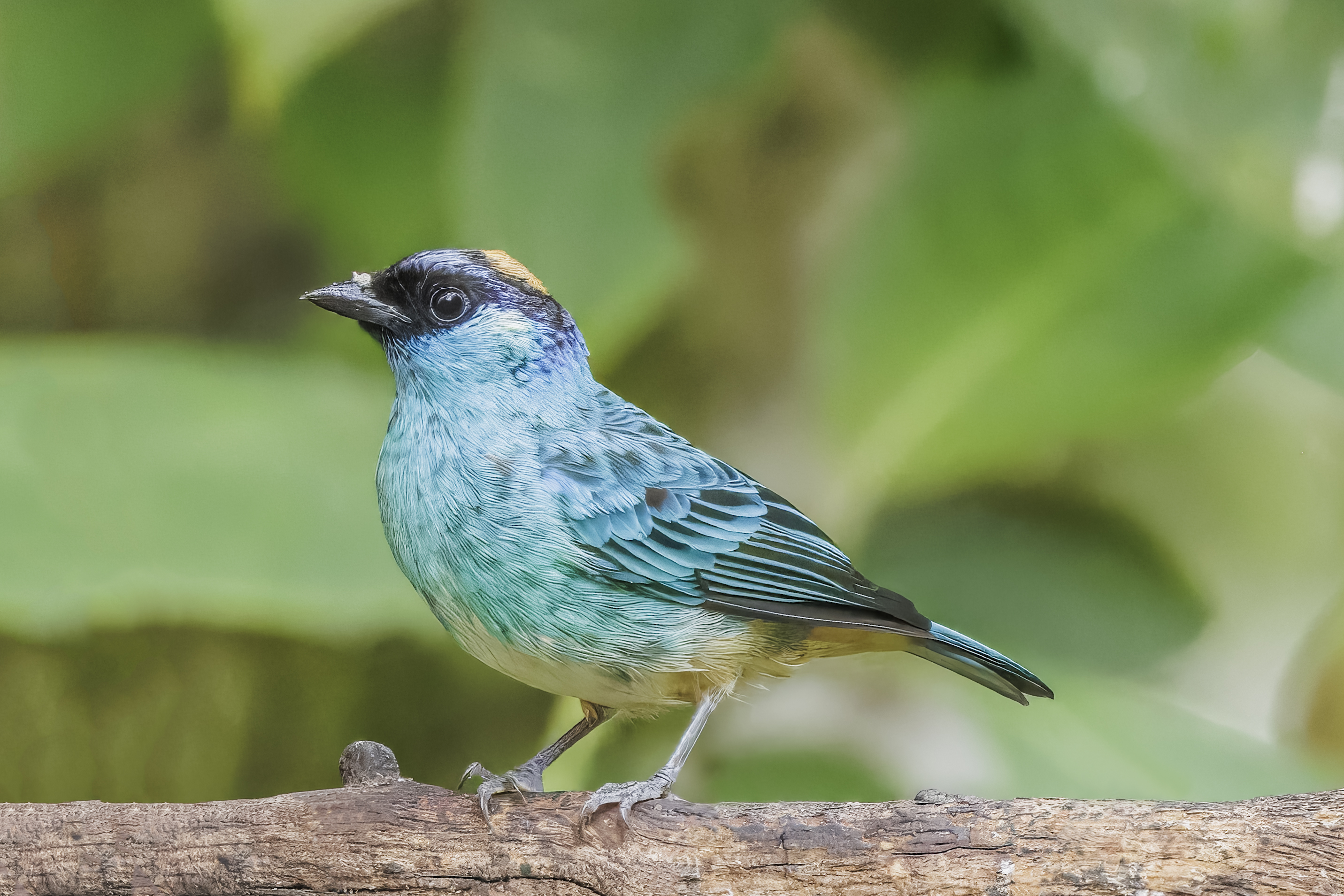

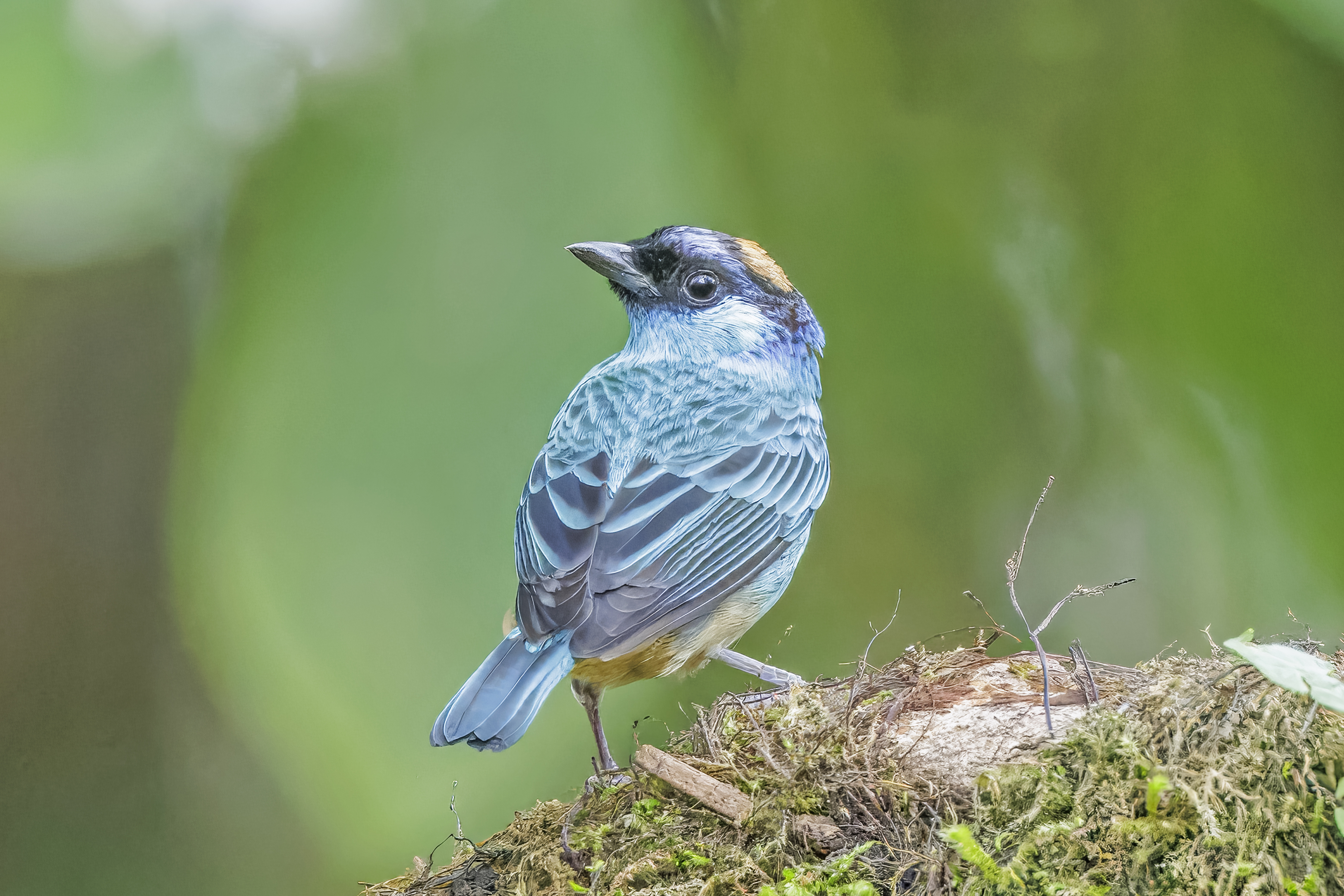
- Both C. r. leucotis in Ecuador

Conservation status
- Least Concern (IUCN 3.1)

Scientific classification
- Kingdom: Animalia
- Phylum: Chordata
- Class: Aves
- Order: Passeriformes
- Family: Thraupidae
- Genus: Chalcothraupis; Bonaparte, 1851
- Species: C. ruficervix

Binomial name
- Chalcothraupis ruficervix (Prévost & Des Murs, 1842)

Synonyms
- Tanagra ruficervix (protonym)

= Golden-naped tanager =

Species of bird

The golden-naped tanager (Chalcothraupis ruficervix) is a species of bird in the tanager family Thraupidae. It is found in South America from Colombia to Bolivia. Its natural habitats are subtropical or tropical moist montane forests and heavily degraded former forest.

== Taxonomy ==
The golden-naped tanager was illustrated by the French naturalists Florent Prévost and Marc Athanase Parfait Oeillet Des Murs in 1842. They coined the binomial name Tanagra ruficervix. The type locality is Bogotá in Colombia. The specific epithet combines the Latin rufus meaning "red" and cervix meaning "nape". A molecular phylogenetic study published in 2014 found that Tangara was polyphyletic and in the rearrangement to create monophyletic genera, the golden-naped tanager was moved to the resurrected genus Chalcothraupis. The genus had originally been introduced by the French naturalist Charles Lucien Bonaparte in 1851 with the golden-naped tanager as the type species. The genus name combines the Ancient Greek khalkos meaning "bronze" and thraupis, an unidentified small bird.

Six subspecies are recognised:

- C. r. ruficervix (Prévost & Des Murs, 1842) – Colombia
- C. r. leucotis (Sclater, PL, 1851) – west Ecuador
- C. r. taylori (Taczanowski & Berlepsch, 1885) – southeast Colombia, east Ecuador and north Peru
- C. r. amabilis (Zimmer, JT, 1943) – north to central Peru
- C. r. inca (Parkes, 1969) – south Peru
- C. r. fulvicervix (Sclater, PL & Salvin, 1876) – southeast Peru and west Bolivia

== Description ==
Golden-naped tanagers have plumage similar to those of the metallic-green tanager, the swallow tanager and the blue-and-black tanager as adults of all three species are primarily blue with black facial masking, however, the golden-naped tanager is the only primarily blue tanager with a golden or reddish crown patch or nape. Females have a similar pattern to males, but have duller colors and a narrower nape patch. Juveniles of both sexes have a primarily dull blue-gray coloration with a lighter breast and belly, and lack the distinctive golden nape.
