= List of New World sparrow species =

The International Ornithological Committee (IOC) recognizes these 141 species in the New World sparrow family Passerellidae, distributed among 30 genera in the following sequence. One extinct species, the Bermuda towhee (†), is included. Confusingly, only 70 of the 141 include "sparrow" in their name. Forty-four are called brushfinches and the remaining 27 have a variety of other names. The North American and South American classification committees of the American Ornithological Society (AOS) and the Clements taxonomy recognize fewer species, BirdLife International's Handbook of the Birds of the World recognizes more, and all three also use some different common names.

This list is presented according to the IOC taxonomic sequence and can also be sorted alphabetically by common name and binomial.

Image	Common name	Binomial name + authority	IOC sequence
	Tanager finch	Oreothraupis arremonops (Sclater, PL, 1855)	1
	Yellow-throated chlorospingus	Chlorospingus flavigularis (Sclater, PL, 1852)	2
	Yellow-whiskered chlorospingus	Chlorospingus parvirostris Chapman, 1901	3
	Ashy-throated chlorospingus	Chlorospingus canigularis (Lafresnaye, 1848)	4
	Sooty-capped chlorospingus	Chlorospingus pileatus Salvin, 1865	5
	Common chlorospingus	Chlorospingus flavopectus (Lafresnaye, 1840)	6
	Tacarcuna chlorospingus	Chlorospingus tacarcunae Griscom, 1924	7
	Pirre chlorospingus	Chlorospingus inornatus (Nelson, 1912)	8
	Dusky chlorospingus	Chlorospingus semifuscus Sclater, PL & Salvin, 1873	9
	Tumbes sparrow	Rhynchospiza stolzmanni (Taczanowski, 1877)	10
	Yungas sparrow	Rhynchospiza dabbenei (Hellmayr, 1912)	11
	Chaco sparrow	Rhynchospiza strigiceps (Gould, 1839)	12
	Rufous-winged sparrow	Peucaea carpalis Coues, 1873	13
	Cinnamon-tailed sparrow	Peucaea sumichrasti (Lawrence, 1871)	14
	Stripe-headed sparrow	Peucaea ruficauda (Bonaparte, 1853)	15
	Black-chested sparrow	Peucaea humeralis (Cabanis, 1851)	16
	Bridled sparrow	Peucaea mystacalis (Hartlaub, 1852)	17
	Botteri's sparrow	Peucaea botterii (Sclater, PL, 1858)	18
	Cassin's sparrow	Peucaea cassinii (Woodhouse, 1852)	19
	Bachman's sparrow	Peucaea aestivalis (Lichtenstein, MHC, 1823)	20
	Grasshopper sparrow	Ammodramus savannarum (Gmelin, JF, 1789)	21
	Grassland sparrow	Ammodramus humeralis (Bosc, 1792)	22
	Yellow-browed sparrow	Ammodramus aurifrons (Spix, 1825)	23
	Olive sparrow	Arremonops rufivirgatus (Lawrence, 1851)	24
	Green-backed sparrow	Arremonops chloronotus (Salvin, 1861)	25
	Black-striped sparrow	Arremonops conirostris (Bonaparte, 1850)	26
	Tocuyo sparrow	Arremonops tocuyensis Todd, 1912	27
	Five-striped sparrow	Amphispizopsis quinquestriata (Sclater, PL & Salvin, 1868)	28
	Black-throated sparrow	Amphispiza bilineata (Cassin, 1850)	29
	Lark sparrow	Chondestes grammacus (Say, 1822)	30
	Lark bunting	Calamospiza melanocorys Stejneger, 1885	31
	Chipping sparrow	Spizella passerina (Bechstein, 1798)	32
	Clay-colored sparrow	Spizella pallida (Swainson, 1832)	33
	Black-chinned sparrow	Spizella atrogularis (Cabanis, 1851)	34
	Field sparrow	Spizella pusilla (Wilson, A, 1810)	35
	Brewer's sparrow	Spizella breweri Cassin, 1856	36
	Worthen's sparrow	Spizella wortheni Ridgway, 1884	37
	Sierra Nevada brushfinch	Arremon basilicus (Bangs, 1898)	38
	Perija brushfinch	Arremon perijanus (Phelps, WH & Gilliard, 1940)	39
	Costa Rican brushfinch	Arremon costaricensis (Bangs, 1907)	40
	Black-headed brushfinch	Arremon atricapillus (Lawrence, 1874)	41
	Caracas brushfinch	Arremon phaeopleurus (Sclater, PL, 1856)	42
	Paria brushfinch	Arremon phygas (Berlepsch, 1912)	43
	Grey-browed brushfinch	Arremon assimilis (Boissonneau, 1840)	44
	White-browed brushfinch	Arremon torquatus (d'Orbigny & Lafresnaye, 1837)	45
	Orange-billed sparrow	Arremon aurantiirostris Lafresnaye, 1847	46
	Black-capped sparrow	Arremon abeillei Lesson, RP, 1844	47
	Maranon sparrow	Arremon nigriceps Taczanowski, 1880	48
	Golden-winged sparrow	Arremon schlegeli Bonaparte, 1850	49
	Yellow-mandibled sparrow	Arremon axillaris Sclater, PL, 1854	50
	Pectoral sparrow	Arremon taciturnus (Hermann, 1783)	51
	Sao Francisco sparrow	Arremon franciscanus Raposo, M, 1997	52
	Half-collared sparrow	Arremon semitorquatus Swainson, 1838	53
	Moss-backed sparrow	Arremon dorbignii Sclater, PL, 1856	54
	Saffron-billed sparrow	Arremon flavirostris Swainson, 1838	55
	Green-striped brushfinch	Arremon virenticeps (Bonaparte, 1855)	56
	Chestnut-capped brushfinch	Arremon brunneinucha (Lafresnaye, 1839)	57
	Sooty-faced finch	Arremon crassirostris (Cassin, 1865)	58
	Olive finch	Arremon castaneiceps (Sclater, PL, 1860)	59
	Sooty fox sparrow	Passerella unalaschcensis (Gmelin, JF, 1789)	60
	Slate-colored fox sparrow	Passerella schistacea Baird, SF, 1858	61
	Thick-billed fox sparrow	Passerella megarhyncha Baird, SF, 1858	62
	Red fox sparrow	Passerella iliaca (Merrem, 1786)	63
	American tree sparrow	Spizelloides arborea (Wilson, A, 1810)	64
	Volcano junco	Junco vulcani (Boucard, 1878)	65
	Guadalupe junco	Junco insularis Ridgway, 1876	66
	Dark-eyed junco	Junco hyemalis (Linnaeus, 1758)	67
	Yellow-eyed junco	Junco phaeonotus Wagler, 1831	68
	Baird's junco	Junco bairdi Ridgway, 1883	69
	Rufous-collared sparrow	Zonotrichia capensis (Müller, PLS, 1776)	70
	White-crowned sparrow	Zonotrichia leucophrys (Forster, JR, 1772)	71
	Golden-crowned sparrow	Zonotrichia atricapilla (Gmelin, JF, 1789)	72
	Harris's sparrow	Zonotrichia querula (Nuttall, 1840)	73
	White-throated sparrow	Zonotrichia albicollis (Gmelin, JF, 1789)	74
	Sagebrush sparrow	Artemisiospiza nevadensis (Ridgway, 1874)	75
	Bell's sparrow	Artemisiospiza belli (Cassin, 1850)	76
	Striped sparrow	Oriturus superciliosus (Swainson, 1838)	77
	Vesper sparrow	Pooecetes gramineus (Gmelin, JF, 1789)	78
	LeConte's sparrow	Ammospiza leconteii (Audubon, 1844)	79
	Seaside sparrow	Ammospiza maritima (Wilson, A, 1811)	80
	Nelson's sparrow	Ammospiza nelsoni (Allen, JA, 1875)	81
	Saltmarsh sparrow	Ammospiza caudacuta (Gmelin, JF, 1788)	82
	Baird's sparrow	Centronyx bairdii (Audubon, 1844)	83
	Henslow's sparrow	Centronyx henslowii (Audubon, 1829)	84
	Savannah sparrow	Passerculus sandwichensis (Gmelin, JF, 1789)	85
	Sierra Madre sparrow	Xenospiza baileyi Bangs, 1931	86
	Song sparrow	Melospiza melodia (Wilson, A, 1810)	87
	Lincoln's sparrow	Melospiza lincolnii (Audubon, 1834)	88
	Swamp sparrow	Melospiza georgiana (Latham, 1790)	89
	Large-footed finch	Pezopetes capitalis Cabanis, 1861	90
	Zapata sparrow	Torreornis inexpectata Barbour & Peters, JL, 1927	91
	Rusty-crowned ground sparrow	Melozone kieneri (Bonaparte, 1850)	92
	Canyon towhee	† Melozone fusca (Swainson, 1827)	93
	White-throated towhee	Melozone albicollis (Sclater, PL, 1858)	94
	Abert's towhee	Melozone aberti (Baird, SF, 1852)	95
	California towhee	Melozone crissalis (Vigors, 1839)	96
	White-eared ground sparrow	Melozone leucotis Cabanis, 1861	97
	Prevost's ground sparrow	Melozone biarcuata (Prévost & des Murs, 1842)	98
	Cabanis's ground sparrow	Melozone cabanisi (Sclater, PL & Salvin, 1868)	99
	Rusty sparrow	Aimophila rufescens (Swainson, 1827)	100
	Rufous-crowned sparrow	Aimophila ruficeps (Cassin, 1852)	101
	Oaxaca sparrow	Aimophila notosticta (Sclater, PL & Salvin, 1868)	102
	Green-tailed towhee	Pipilo chlorurus (Audubon, 1839)	103
	Spotted towhee	Pipilo maculatus Swainson, 1827	104
	Eastern towhee	Pipilo erythrophthalmus (Linnaeus, 1758)	105
	Bermuda towhee	Pipilo naufragus Olson & Wingate, 2012	106
	Collared towhee	Pipilo ocai (Lawrence, 1865)	107
	Rufous-capped brushfinch	Atlapetes pileatus Wagler, 1831	108
	White-naped brushfinch	Atlapetes albinucha (d'Orbigny & Lafresnaye, 1838)	109
	Yellow-thighed brushfinch	Atlapetes tibialis (Lawrence, 1864)	110
	Yellow-green brushfinch	Atlapetes luteoviridis (Griscom, 1924)	111
	Moustached brushfinch	Atlapetes albofrenatus (Boissonneau, 1840)	112
	Merida brushfinch	Atlapetes meridae (Sclater, PL & Salvin, 1871)	113
	Tepui brushfinch	Atlapetes personatus (Cabanis, 1849)	114
	Santa Marta brushfinch	Atlapetes melanocephalus (Salvin & Godman, 1880)	115
	Ochre-breasted brushfinch	Atlapetes semirufus (Boissonneau, 1840)	116
	Yellow-headed brushfinch	Atlapetes flaviceps Chapman, 1912	117
	Dusky-headed brushfinch	Atlapetes fuscoolivaceus Chapman, 1914	118
	White-rimmed brushfinch	Atlapetes leucopis (Sclater, PL & Salvin, 1878)	119
	White-headed brushfinch	Atlapetes albiceps (Taczanowski, 1884)	120
	Rufous-eared brushfinch	Atlapetes rufigenis (Salvin, 1895)	121
	Choco brushfinch	Atlapetes crassus Bangs, 1908	122
	Tricolored brushfinch	Atlapetes tricolor (Taczanowski, 1875)	123
	Slaty brushfinch	Atlapetes schistaceus (Boissonneau, 1840)	124
	Taczanowksi's brushfinch	Atlapetes taczanowksii (Sclater, PL & Salvin, 1875)	125
	Pale-naped brushfinch	Atlapetes pallidinucha (Boissonneau, 1840)	126
	Antioquia brushfinch	Atlapetes blancae Donegan, 2007	127
	Yellow-breasted brushfinch	Atlapetes latinuchus (Du Bus de Gisignies, 1855)	128
	Black-fronted brushfinch	Atlapetes nigrifrons Phelps, WH & Gilliard, 1940	129
	White-winged brushfinch	Atlapetes leucopterus (Jardine, 1856)	130
	Pale-headed brushfinch	Atlapetes pallidiceps (Sharpe, 1900)	131
	Bay-crowned brushfinch	Atlapetes seebohmi (Taczanowski, 1883)	132
	Rusty-bellied brushfinch	Atlapetes nationi (Sclater, PL, 1881)	133
	Apurimac brushfinch	Atlapetes forbesi Morrison, 1947	134
	Black-spectacled brushfinch	Atlapetes melanopsis Valqui & Fjeldså, 2002	135
	Vilcabamba brushfinch	Atlapetes terborghi Remsen, 1993	136
	Cuzco brushfinch	Atlapetes canigenis Chapman, 1919	137
	Grey-eared brushfinch	Atlapetes melanolaemus (Sclater, PL & Salvin, 1879)	138
	Bolivian brushfinch	Atlapetes rufinucha (d'Orbigny & Lafresnaye, 1837)	139
	Fulvous-headed brushfinch	Atlapetes fulviceps (d'Orbigny & Lafresnaye, 1837)	140
	Yellow-striped brushfinch	Atlapetes citrinellus (Cabanis, 1883)	141
