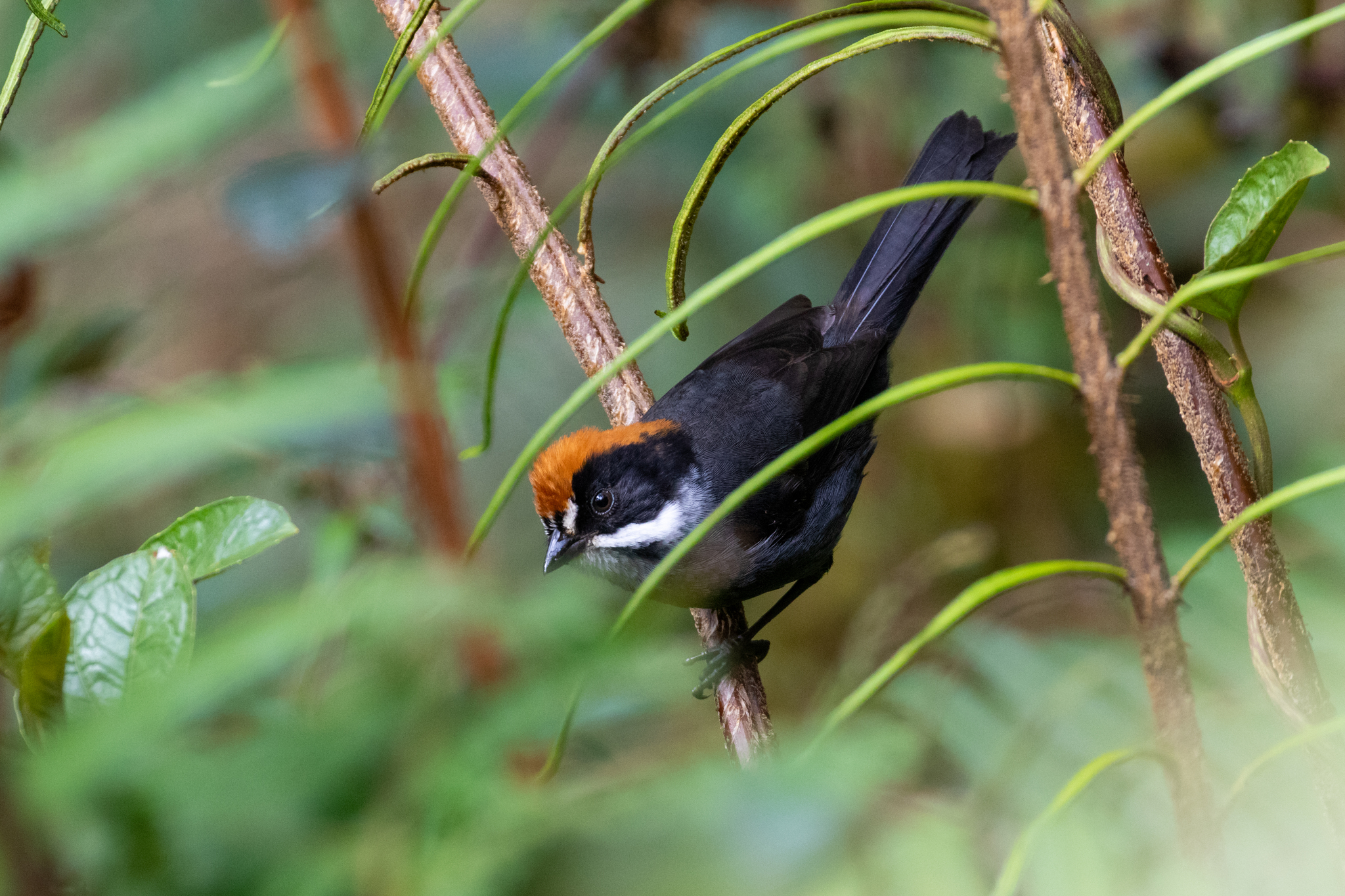

Conservation status
- Least Concern (IUCN 3.1)

Scientific classification
- Kingdom: Animalia
- Phylum: Chordata
- Class: Aves
- Order: Passeriformes
- Family: Passerellidae
- Genus: Atlapetes
- Species: A. taczanowskii

Binomial name
- Atlapetes taczanowskii (Sclater & Salvin, 1875)

= Taczanowski's brushfinch =

Species of bird

Taczanowski's brushfinch or Peruvian slaty brushfinch (Atlapetes taczanowskii) is a species of passerine bird in the New World sparrow family Passerellidae. It is endemic to Peru.

== Taxonomy and systematics ==
Taczanowski's brushfinch was formally described in 1874 by the Polish zoologist Władysław Taczanowski with the binomial Buarremon mystacalis, based on a specimen collected in the Andes of central Peru. Unfortunately, he chose a specific epithet that had been used in 1852 by Philip Sclater for Arremon mysticalis, now considered to be a junior synonym of Atlapetes albofrenatus Boissonneu, 1840, the moustached brushfinch. In 1875 the English ornithologists Philip Sclater and Osbert Salvin proposed the replacement name Buarremon taczanowskii for this species. In the early twentieth century genus Buarremon was merged into Atlapetes.

Taczanowski's brushfinch was long treated as a subspecies of the slaty brushfinch (Atlapetes schistaceus). A study published in 2015 found significant differences in morphology, vocalizations, and mitochondrial DNA sequences between the two. BirdLife International's Handbook of the Birds of the World restored Taczanowski's brushfinch as a species in 2016. The IOC and the Clements taxonomy followed suit in 2024, though Clements calls it the Peruvian slaty brushfinch. The first version of AviList in 2025 also recognized it. However, as of February 2026 the independent South American Classification Committee has declined to recognize the split.

Taczanowski's brushfinch is monotypic.

== Description ==
Taczanowski's brushfinch is 18 cm (7.1 in) long. The sexes have the same plumage. Adults have a russet or pale orange crown and nape and a mostly black face. They have a whitish spot above the lores and a long white "moustache" with a thin black stripe below it. Their upperparts are dark gray and their tail blackish. Their wings are mostly blackish with white marginal coverts that show as a white spot on the folded wing. Their throat is whitish with dark speckles, their breast, flanks, and undertail coverts medium gray, and the center of their belly whitish. They have a dark reddish brown iris, a blackish bill, and brown-gray legs and feet. Juveniles have a duller rufous crown and a duller blackish face than adults. Their upperparts are olive and their underparts mostly pale grayish with olive flanks and breast and heavy streaks.

== Distribution and habitat ==
Taczanowski's brushfinch is found in central Peru on the eastern slope of the Andes between Huánuco and Junín departments. It inhabits the shrubby undergrowth and edges of humid montane forest. In elevation it ranges from 2,500 to 3,700 m (8,200 to 12,100 ft).

== Behavior ==
=== Movement ===
Taczanowski's brushfinch is a year-round resident.

=== Feeding ===
The diet and feeding behavior of Taczanowski's brushfinch have not been studied separately from those of the slaty brushfinch when they were considered conspecific. They are assumed to be similar and are described here.

=== Breeding ===
A fledgling Taczanowski's brushfinch was found in mid-November, suggesting that the species' breeding season mostly precedes that month. Nothing else is known about its breeding biology.

=== Vocalization ===
The song of Taczanowski's brushfinch is "a variable, pleasant series of rich introductory notes followed by a different trill or series of notes, for example: chew-chew-chew ZEEEE". When excited, pairs duet with "a mellow dee-du-dew-dew interspersed with high screeches and twittering".

== Status ==
The IUCN has assessed Taczanowski's brushfinch as being of Least Concern. It has a restricted range; its population size is not known but is believed to be stable. No immediate threats have been identified. It is considered fairly common in that small range.
