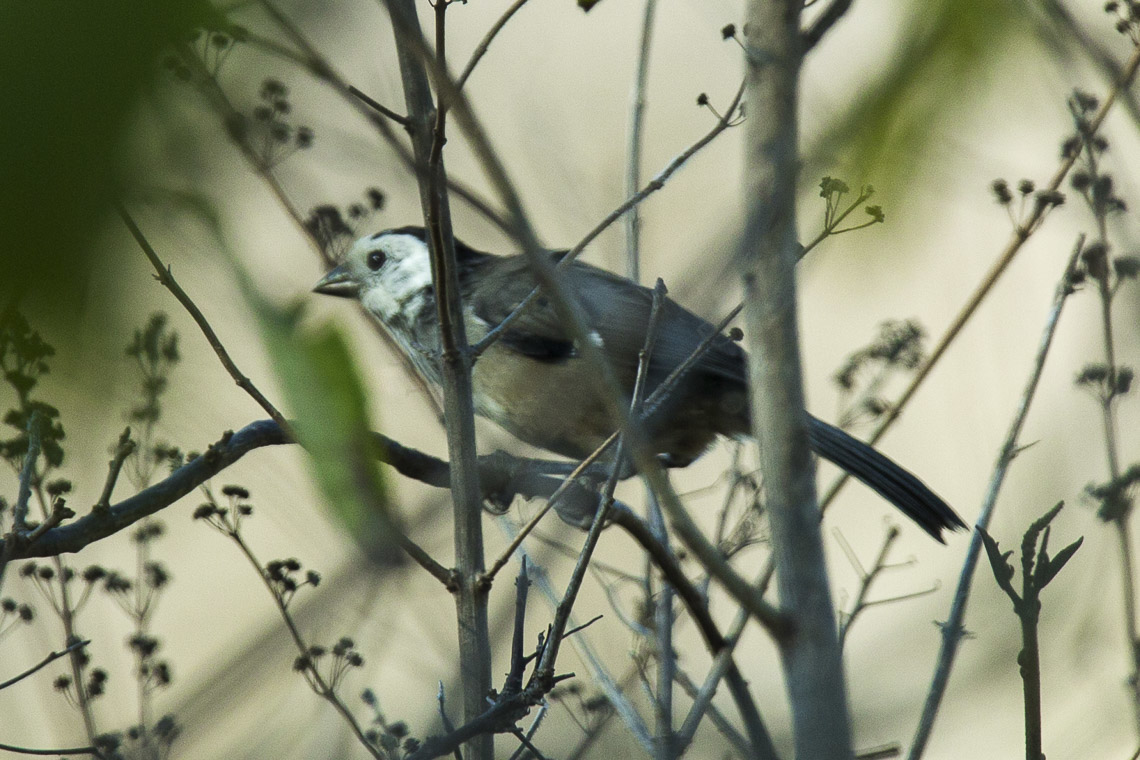

Conservation status
- Least Concern (IUCN 3.1)

Scientific classification
- Kingdom: Animalia
- Phylum: Chordata
- Class: Aves
- Order: Passeriformes
- Family: Passerellidae
- Genus: Atlapetes
- Species: A. albiceps

Binomial name
- Atlapetes albiceps (Taczanowski, 1884)

= White-headed brushfinch =

Species of bird

The white-headed brushfinch (Atlapetes albiceps) is a species of bird in the family Passerellidae, the New World sparrows. It is found in Ecuador and Peru.

== Taxonomy and systematics ==
The white-headed brushfinch was formally described in 1884 with the binomial Buarremon albiceps. In the early twentieth century genus Buarremon was merged into Atlapetes.

The white-headed brushfinch is monotypic. However, some authors have suggested that the pale-headed brushfinch (A. palidiceps) should be a subspecies of it but they are not closely related.

== Description ==
The white-headed brushfinch is 16 to 17 cm (6.3 to 6.7 in) long. It weighs 35 to 39 g (1.2 to 1.4 oz). The sexes have the same plumage. Adults have a black crown and nape; the rest of their head including the forecrown is white. Their upperparts are slate gray and their wings and tail are slightly more blackish. Their primaries have white bases that show as a patch on the closed wing. A very thin black line separates their ear coverts from their throat. Their breast and flanks are grayish and their belly and vent white. They have a brown iris, a black bill, and gray legs and feet.

== Distribution and habitat ==
The white-headed brushfinch is found on the Andes' Pacific slope from southern Loja Province in southwestern Ecuador south to Lambayeque and southwestern Cajamarca departments in northern Peru. It inhabits dry deciduous forest, dry scrublands, and gallery forest. In elevation it ranges between 200 and 1,100 m (700 and 3,600 ft) in Ecuador and up to 1,400 m (4,600 ft) in Peru.

== Behavior ==
=== Movement ===
The white-headed brushfinch is a year-round resident.

=== Feeding ===
The white-headed brushfinch's diet has not been studied but is known to include seeds and arthropods. It usually forages in pairs or small groups, on the ground and in low vegetation. It sometimes flocks with other brushfinches.

=== Breeding ===
Nothing is known about the white-headed brushfinch's breeding biology.

=== Vocalization ===
The white-headed brushfinch sings "a series of squeaky whistled notes, for example: PEE-ti-ti SEW-tew'tew'tew see-see". When a pair is excited, they make "a liquid descending chatter with some high screeches and twitters". The species' calls are "a high rising-falling tseeEEee", a "high ti", and "tseeip notes".

== Status ==
The IUCN has assessed the white-headed brushfinch as being of Least Concern. It has a small range; its population size is not known and is believed to be decreasing. No immediate threats have been identified. It is considered uncommon to locally fairly common in Ecuador and fairly common in Peru. "Human activity has little short-term direct effect on the White-headed Brush-Finch, other than the local effects of habitat destruction. Habitat loss is a potentially serious threat, however, given the relatively small distribution of this species, and the heavy land use in this region for agricultural purposes, primarily livestock grazing and subsistence farming."
