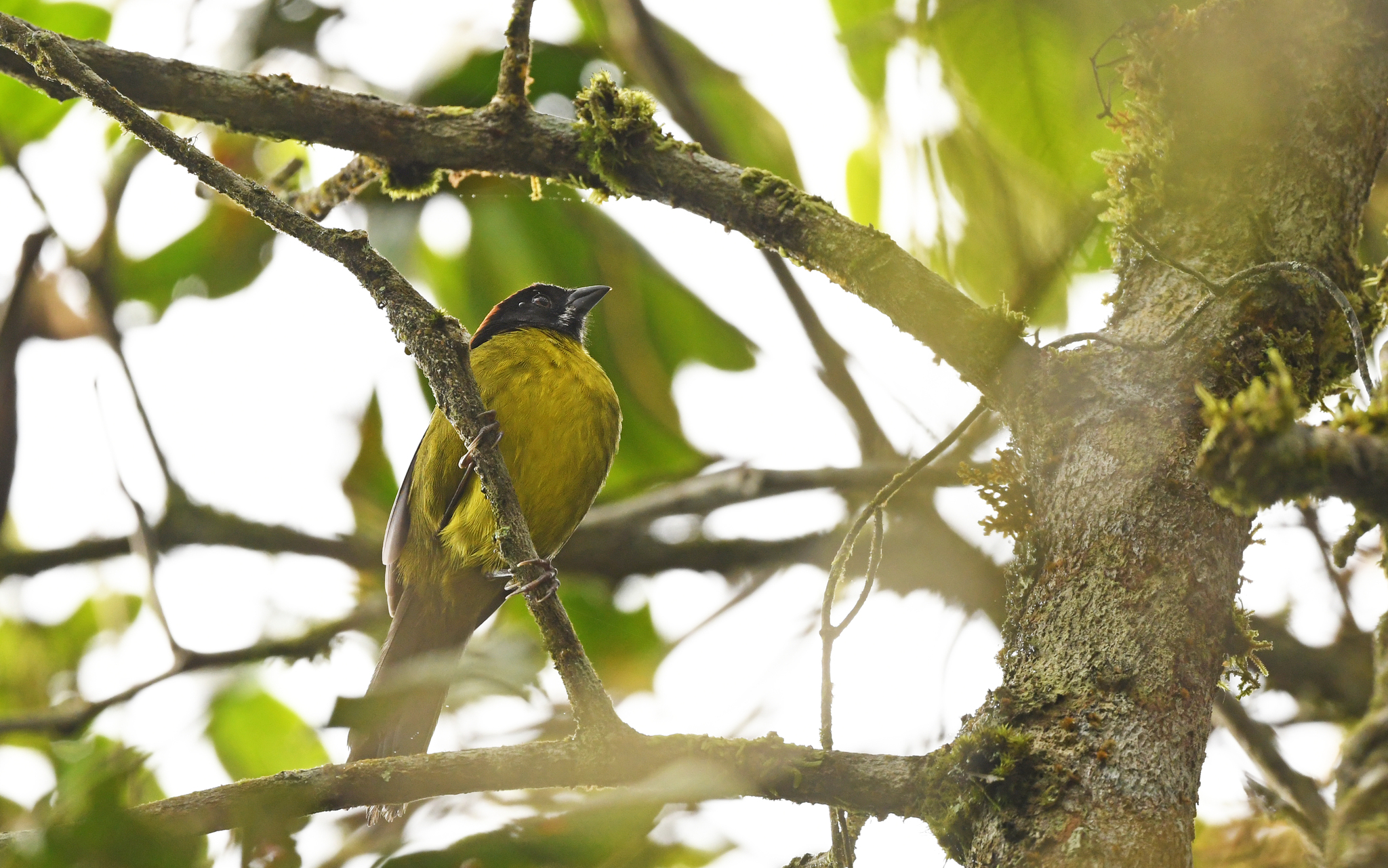

Conservation status
- Least Concern (IUCN 3.1)

Scientific classification
- Kingdom: Animalia
- Phylum: Chordata
- Class: Aves
- Order: Passeriformes
- Family: Passerellidae
- Genus: Atlapetes
- Species: A. albofrenatus

Binomial name
- Atlapetes albofrenatus (Boissonneau, 1840)

= Moustached brushfinch =

Species of bird

The moustached brushfinch (Atlapetes albofrenatus) is a species of bird in the family Passerellidae.

It is found in northern Colombia, where its natural habitats are subtropical or tropical moist montane forest and heavily degraded former forest.

== Taxonomy and systematics ==
The moustached brushfinch was first formally described in 1940 by the French ornithologist Auguste Boissonneau. He named it Tanagra (arremon) albo-frenatus, considering it to be part of the Tanager family.

A study of the mitochondrial DNA gene sequences for the family Passerellidae indicated that the moustached brushfinch is most closely related to the ochre-breasted brushfinch, found in Colombia and Venezuela, and the Santa Marta brushfinch, endemic to Colombia.

Two subspecies are recognised:

- A. a. albofrenatus (Boissonneau, A, 1840) – eastern Andes of Colombia (Norte de Santander to Cundinamarca)
- A. a. meridae (Sclater, PL & Salvin, O, 1871) – Andes of western Venezuela (Táchira and Mérida)

The subspecies A. a. meridae has sometimes been treated as a separate species, the Merida brushfinch, but both taxa have variable plumage and there is no published genetic data.

== Description ==
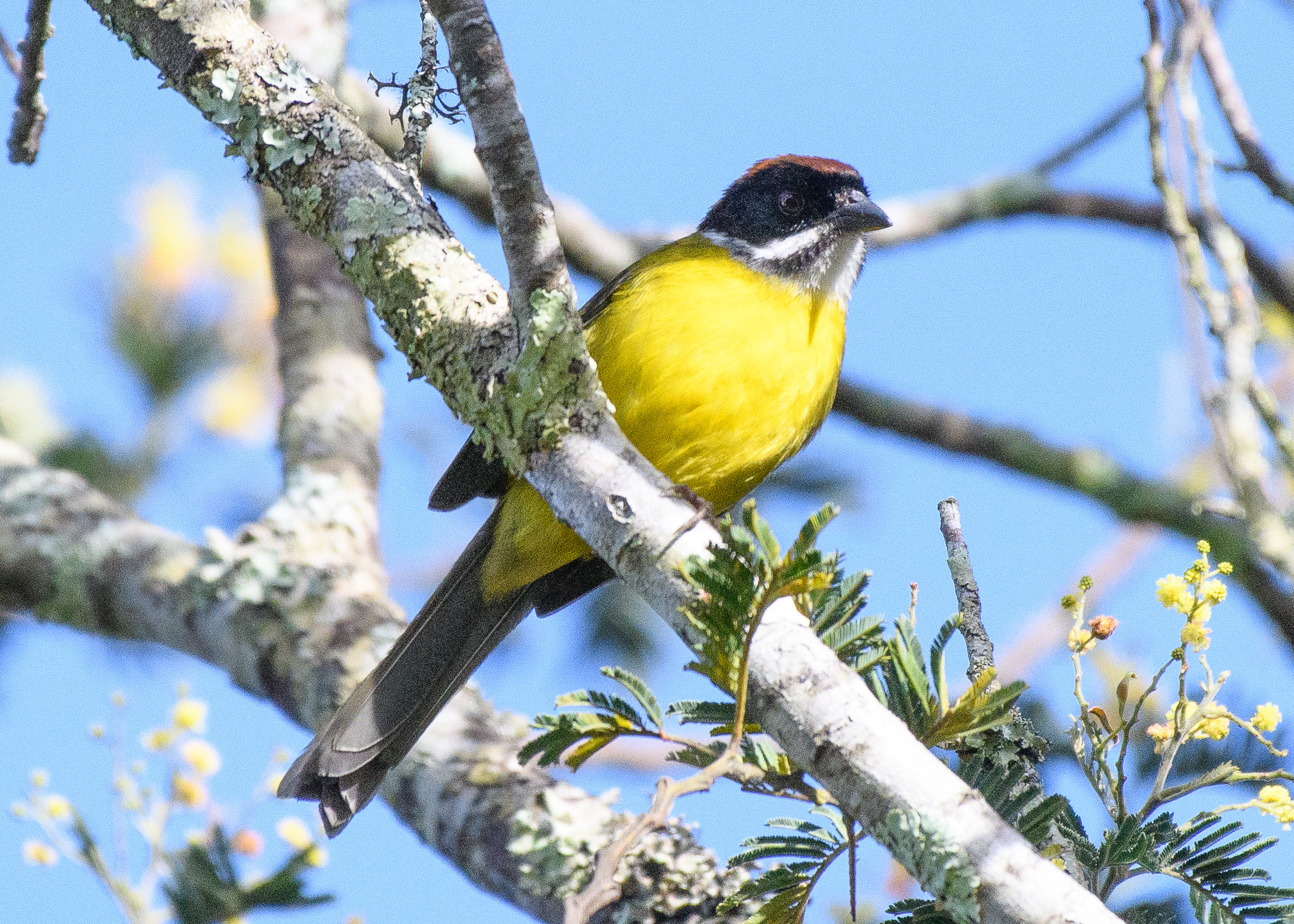
In Santander Department, Colombia

Like most Atlapetes species, the moustached brushfinch is a large-headed, long-tailed New World sparrow.

Adult. Adults are between 17.5 and 18cm in length, and weigh approximately 30g. Their upper parts are mostly olive green, with the primaries and tail being black tinged with olive. The breast, belly and vent are deep yellow, while the flanks are yellow with a greenish wash.

The species has a striking head pattern, with a bright chestnut-rufous cap and nape, black forehead, and an all black mask extending from the lores to the nape. The throat and malar stripes are white, separated by black submalars. In some poses the white malar stripe can be seen to extend almost to the nape.

The bill is black, the irises are red or reddish brown, and the tarsi and toes are brownish grey or pinkish grey.

Juvenile. Brownish olive above, dusky olive yellowish below with faint streaking. The moustachial area is dull yellow with a weakly formed malar stripe. The mask and sides of the head are duller blackish or dusky, and the crown is olive to brownish olive (not chestnut).

Similar species. The plumage of the merida brushfinch of Venezuela is distinguished from that of the moustached brushfinch by its yellow throat, a lighter crown described as cinnamon-rufous, a broader white malar stripe with a narrow black submalar, and a much narrower area of black on the forehead.

== Distribution and habitat ==
The moustached brushfinch is endemic to Colombia's Eastern Andes. Its range extends from just south of Bogotá to Santander. It appears to be localized in several disjunct areas rather than being widely distributed within the overall range. It is a species of the upper tropical and subtropical zones, and thus typically occurs between 1400 and 2500m in altitude, although it has been seen as low as 1000m. The species is resident (i.e. non-migratory).

The species inhabits the borders, undergrowth and midstory of thick subtropical cloud, elfin, and oak-dominated forests, as well as tangles of dry, thorny, scrubby brush. It is tolerant of disturbed habitat, and can be found in dense foliage on the borders of regenerating secondary forest.

== Behaviour and ecology ==
Behaviour. Moustached brushfinches normally move around quickly inside dense tangles of brush, with occasional visits to more exposed positions. They have been observed foraging, mainly close to the ground (<10m), as single birds, in pairs, and in what appear to be small family groups.

Diet. Insects, seeds and fruit.

Breeding. The breeding behaviour of the species has not been studied. The only relevant observation that has been recorded is that of an immature bird seen near Soatá in January, suggesting that breeding takes place in the December/January period.

== Status ==
The IUCN rates the species as Least Concern. No studies have been conducted the size of the population, but in the absence of evidence of significant declines in numbers or substantial threats its population is assessed as stable. No conservation measures specific to this species are in place.
