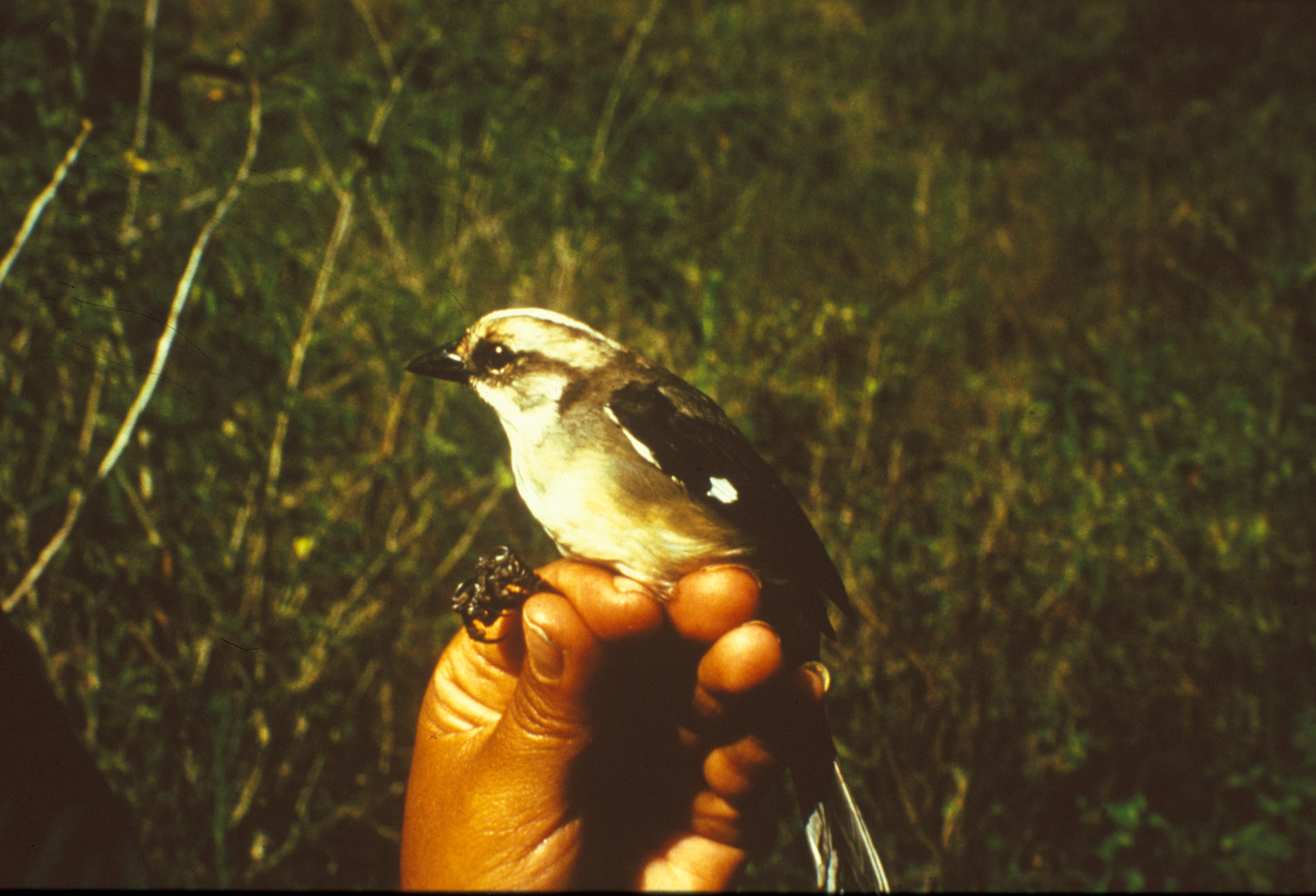

Conservation status
- Endangered (IUCN 3.1)

Scientific classification
- Kingdom: Animalia
- Phylum: Chordata
- Class: Aves
- Order: Passeriformes
- Family: Passerellidae
- Genus: Atlapetes
- Species: A. pallidiceps

Binomial name
- Atlapetes pallidiceps (Sharpe, 1900)

= Pale-headed brushfinch =

Species of bird

The pale-headed brushfinch (Atlapetes pallidiceps) is a species of bird in the family Passerellidae. It is endemic to the Jubones River drainage in south-central Ecuador.

== Description ==
Atlapetes pallidiceps was considered to be possibly extinct before its rediscovery in 1998, having last been recorded in 1969.

The species eats insects, seeds, and fruit, and engages in perch-gleaning behavior.

== Vocalizations ==
Male pale-headed brushfinches are the only sex that appears to vocalize in this species; their song is composed of 5 - 12 notes separated into three groups. These songs appear to be used primarily for the communication of territorial bounds, more commonly in young birds. A. pallidiceps songs are comparable to the songs of other Atlapetes members.

== Habitat ==
Atlapetes pallidiceps inhabits a less than 4 km² area of the Yunguilla Valley, characterized by sparsely-vegetated landslide rifts and fallow fields at elevations between 1,650–1,900 meters. Males have an average territory size of 0.7–1.4 hectares, typically within 100 meters of a stream, which generally contains large stands of Chusquea sp. bamboo.

== Conservation ==
The pale-headed brushfinch is classified as endangered, with total population of the species estimated to be 240–340 individuals (160–226 mature individuals).

This species has historically been heavily threatened by brood parasitism from the shiny cowbird (Molothrus bonariensis), with an estimated 38.5% of all A. pallidiceps nests being parasitized. After a management plan which included mass culling of cowbirds, the population has increased by a magnitude of 5 times pre-intervention size.

Upon the species' rediscovery, the population was very small, having only 12-22 breeding males across the Yunguilla Reserve in 1999. Due to aggressive conservation management, the population rapidly increased to a peak size of 110-120 distinct, male-occupied territories in 2008. These conservation efforts are believed to have stabilized the population, but the species remains restricted to the small Yunguilla Reserve and may have reached the carrying capacity of its current habitat.

The pale-headed brush-finch may compete for resources or be displaced from areas outside its small, known habitat by the white-browned brushfinch (Burraremon torquatus), rufous-collared sparrow (Zonotrichia capensis), and congeners Bolivian brushfinch (A. rufincha) and white-winged brushfinch (A. leucopterus).
