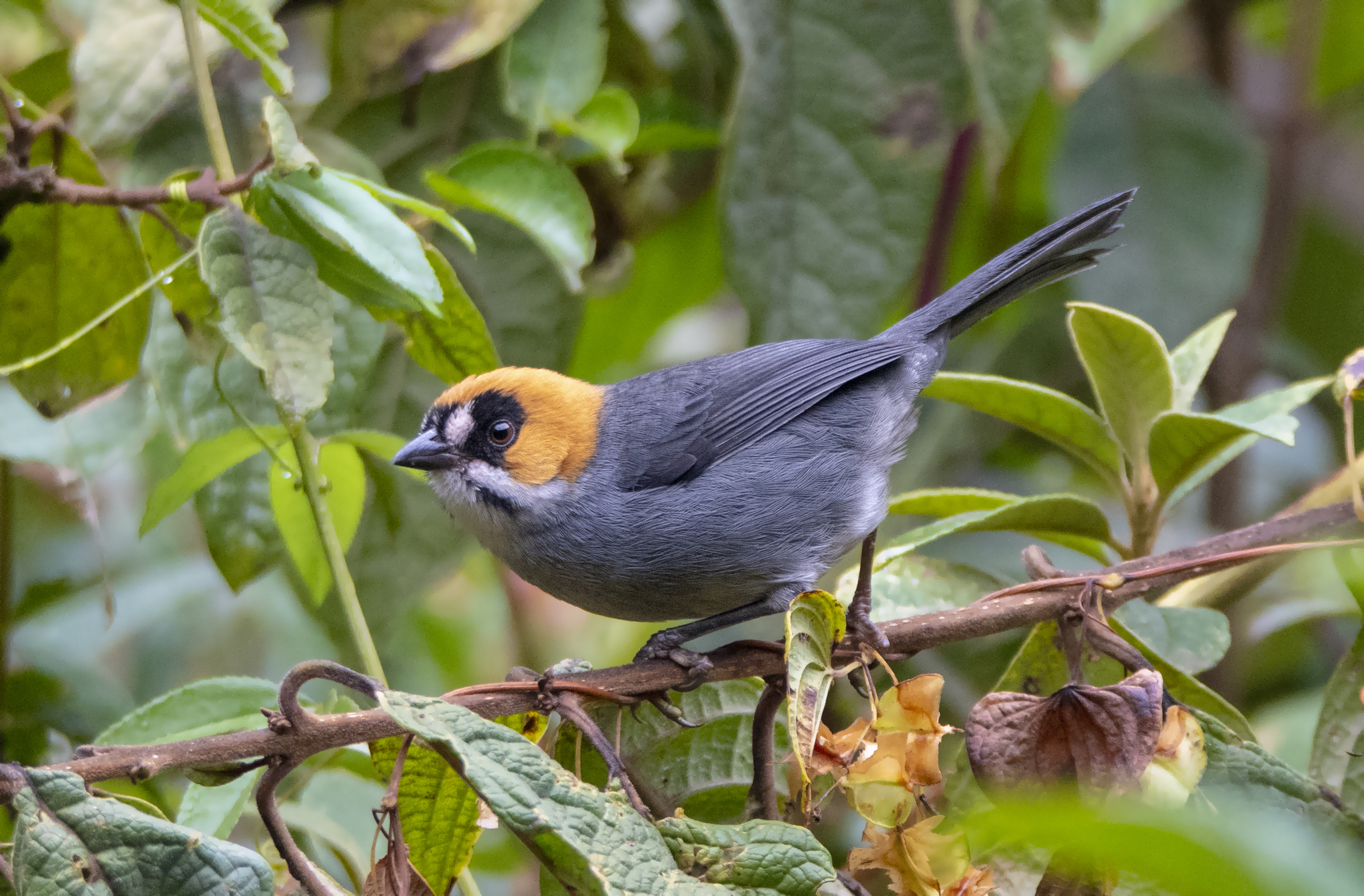

Conservation status
- Near Threatened (IUCN 3.1)

Scientific classification
- Kingdom: Animalia
- Phylum: Chordata
- Class: Aves
- Order: Passeriformes
- Family: Passerellidae
- Genus: Atlapetes
- Species: A. melanopsis

Binomial name
- Atlapetes melanopsis Valqui & Fjeldså, 2002

Synonyms
- see text

= Black-spectacled brushfinch =

Species of bird

The black-spectacled brushfinch (Atlapetes melanopsis) is a Near Threatened species of bird in the family Passerellidae, the New World sparrows. It is endemic to Peru.

== Taxonomy and systematics ==
The black-spectacled brushfinch was first described by Thomas Valqui and Jon Fjeldså in 1999 with the binomial Atlapetes melanops. The authors later realized that the specific epithet melanops already applied to another brushfinch species so in 2002 they coined its current binomial A. melanopsis. It had acquired its current English name by 2007.

The black-spectacled brushfinch is monotypic.

== Description ==
The black-spectacled brushfinch is 16 to 19 cm (6.3 to 7.5 in) long. The sexes have the same plumage. Adults have a mostly ochraceous tawny head and nape with a black forecrown and lores and large black area around the eye. They have a white streak above the lores and a white lower cheek with a black line below it. Their upperparts are gray and their tail black. Their wing coverts are blackish and their flight feathers blackish with paler outer edges. Their chin is grayish, their throat white, their breast and belly pale gray, and their flanks darker gray. They have a dark reddish brown iris, a black bill, and gray legs and feet.

== Distribution and habitat ==
The black-spectacled brushfinch is known only from the upper watershed of the Mantaro River in the Peruvian departments of Junín and Huancavelica. It inhabits the edges of montane forest and scrublands at elevations between 2,500 and 3,400 m (8,200 and 11,200 ft).

== Behavior ==
=== Movement ===
The black-spectacled brushfinch is a year-round resident.

=== Feeding ===
The black-spectacled brushfinch's diet has not been studied but is assumed to include invertebrates, seeds, and maybe small fruits. It forages on the ground or up to about 3 m (10 ft) above it in vegetation, where it sometime hovers to snatch food. Up to three individuals are commonly seen together.

=== Breeding ===
Nothing is known about the black-spectacled brushfinch's breeding biology.

=== Vocalization ===
The black-spectacled brushfinch's song is "a simple tew whee?, sometimes followed by some descending cheelu-cheelu phrases". Excited pairs duet "a characteristic swee tititi chew chew tsew-tsew". The species' call is "a lisping wees?".

== Status ==
The IUCN originally in 2000 assessed the black-spectacled brushfinch as Endangered but since 2021 as Near Threatened. It has a small range; its estimated population of between 1500 and 7000 mature individuals is believed to be decreasing. "Habitat destruction at elevations suitable for this species has been ongoing for several hundred years, but is probably not increasing...Nonetheless, burning to maintain and increase available pasture prevents the regeneration of natural vegetation, except in steep, rocky areas and ravines."
