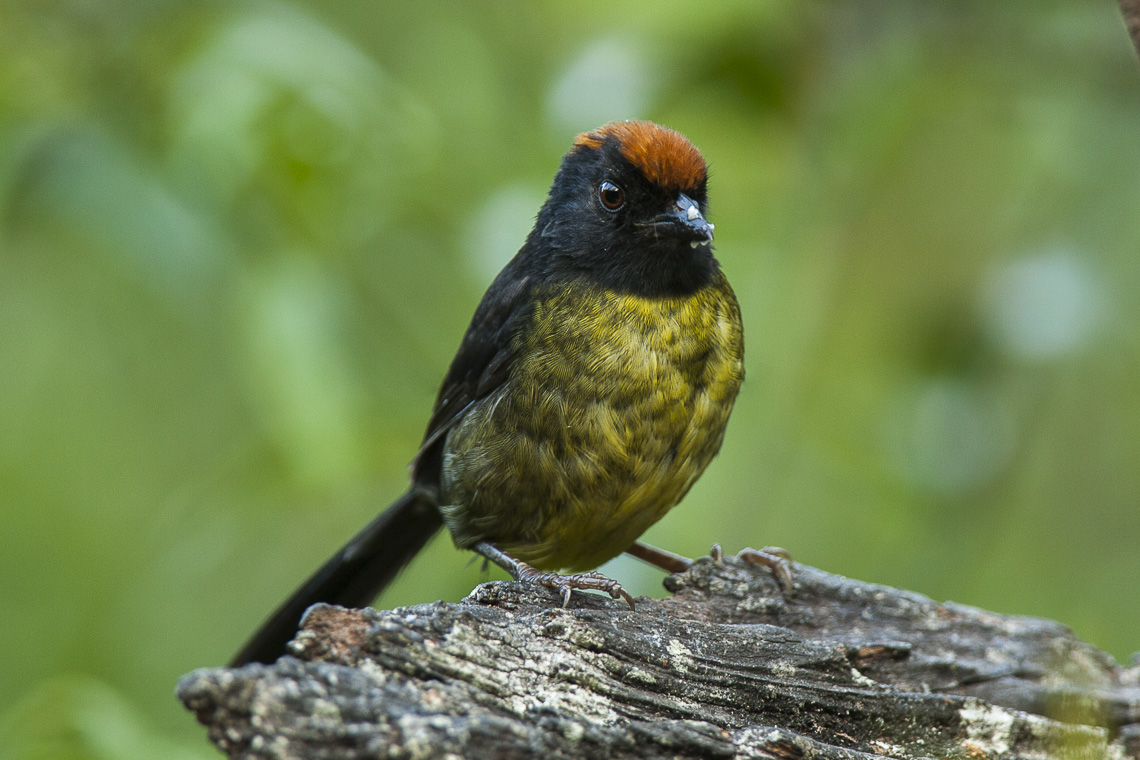

Conservation status
- Least Concern (IUCN 3.1)

Scientific classification
- Kingdom: Animalia
- Phylum: Chordata
- Class: Aves
- Order: Passeriformes
- Family: Passerellidae
- Genus: Atlapetes
- Species: A. melanolaemus

Binomial name
- Atlapetes melanolaemus (Sclater, PL & Salvin, 1879)

= Grey-eared brushfinch =

Species of bird

The grey-eared brushfinch or black-faced brushfinch (Atlapetes melanolaemus) is a species of bird in the family Passerellidae, the New World sparrows. It is found in Bolivia and Peru.

== Taxonomy and systematics ==
The grey-eared brushfinch was formally described in 1879 with the binomial Buarremon melanolaemus. Genus Buarremon was merged into Atlapetes early in the twentieth century. Various twentieth century authors treated the grey-eared brushfinch as conspecific with what was then the rufous-naped brushfinch (A. rufinucha sensu lato), a species that was split into many species in the early twenty-first century.

The grey-eared brushfinch is monotypic.

== Description ==
The grey-eared brushfinch is about 17 cm (6.7 in) long and weighs about 27 to 30 g (0.95 to 1.1 oz). The sexes have the same plumage. Adults have a bright rufous forehead, crown, and nape. Their face, chin, and throat are blackish. Their upperparts are blackish with a slight olive wash on the rump. Their tail is blackish with olive feather edges. Their wings are wholly blackish. Their underparts are dull yellow with dusky scaling on the breast and a dusky olive wash on the flanks. They have a dark reddish iris, a black bill, and blackish legs and feet.

== Distribution and habitat ==
The grey-eared brushfinch is found in the Andes of Peru from eastern Cuzco Department south through Puno Department and into western Bolivia's La Paz Department. It inhabits humid montane forest and slopes with shrubs at elevations from 1,400 to 3,300 m (4,600 to 10,800 ft).

== Behavior ==
=== Movement ===
The grey-eared brushfinch is a year-round resident.

=== Feeding ===
The grey-eared brushfinch's diet has not been studied. It forages on the ground or slightly above it in vegetation.

=== Breeding ===
The grey-eared brushfinch nests between late July and early December with activity peaking in October. Its nest is an open cup made from coarse grass and bamboo leaves lined with fine grass. It is typically well hidden in vegetation such as grasses, ferns, and bushes on the ground or up to about 3 m (10 ft) above it. The clutch is two eggs that are creamy pink with reddish or brown spots. The incubation period is 14 to 15 days and fledging occurs 13 to 14 days after hatch. Details of parental care are not known.

=== Vocalization ===
The grey-eared brushfinch's song is "a pleasing, simple series of whistled phrases, somewhat variable, for example: twee-twee and chew-seelip". Excited pairs duet "a series of shrill, wiry whistles and chatters, often ending in a rattling trill". The species' call is "a high ti".

== Status ==
The IUCN has assessed the grey-eared brushfinch as being of Least Concern. It has a limited range; its population size is not known and is believed to be decreasing. No immediate threats have been identified. It is considered locally common to fairly common overall and fairly common in Peru.
