= Vilcabamba brushfinch =

Conservation status
- Near Threatened (IUCN 3.1)

Scientific classification
- Kingdom: Animalia
- Phylum: Chordata
- Class: Aves
- Order: Passeriformes
- Family: Passerellidae
- Genus: Atlapetes
- Species: A. terborghi

Binomial name
- Atlapetes terborghi Remsen, 1993

Species of bird

The Vilcabamba brushfinch (Atlapetes terborghi) is a Near Threatened species of bird in the family Passerellidae, the New World sparrows. It is endemic to Peru.

== Taxonomy and systematics ==
The Vilcabamba brushfinch was first described in 1993 as a subspecies of what was then called the rufous-naped brushfinch with the trinomial Atlapetes rufinucha terborghi. Its specific epithet honors Dr. John W. Terborgh, "who engineered and conducted" the ornithological exploration of the Cordillera Vilcabamba. Terborgh and John S. Weske collected the type specimen in 1967. It was soon recognized as a full species.

The Vilcabamba brushfinch is monotypic.

== Description ==
The Vilcabamba brushfinch is 16.5 to 17 cm (6.5 to 6.7 in) long; one individual weighed 25.7 g (0.91 oz). The sexes have the same plumage. Adults have a rufous forecrown, crown, and nape. The rest of their face is black. Their upperparts and tail are black with an olive green cast to the back. Their wings are black with an olive green cast on the outer webs of the secondaries. Their chin and throat are pale greenish yellow, and their breast green that smoothly transitions from the throat and to the yellow belly. Their flanks and undertail coverts are olive green. They have a rich brown iris, a black bill, and dark brown legs and feet.

== Distribution and habitat ==
The Vilcabamba brushfinch is known only in the area of its initial discovery on the western slope of the isolated Cordillera Vilcabamba in south-central Peru's Cuzco Department. However, it is thought to probably be somewhat more widespread. Its known habitats are humid montane forest, elfin forest, and the ecotone between elfin forest and humid grassland. In elevation it ranges between 2,520 and 3,520 m (8,300 and 11,500 ft).

== Behavior ==
=== Movement ===
As far as is known, the Vilcabamba brushfinch is a year-round resident.

=== Feeding ===
The Vilcabamba brushfinch's diet has not been studied but is assumed to include invertebrates and seeds.

=== Breeding ===
The Vicabamba brushfinch's breeding season includes July, when individuals in breeding condition were collected. Nothing else is known about the species' breeding biology.

=== Vocalization ===
As of May 2026 neither xeno-canto nor the Cornell Lab of Ornithology's Macaulay Library had any recordings of Vilcabamba brushfinch vocalizations, and they have not been described.

== Status ==
The IUCN has assessed the Vilcabamba brushfinch as Near Threatened. It has a very small overall range of about 5,400 km^{2} (2,100 sq mi) of which it occupies about 4,000 km^{2} (1,500 sq mi). Its population size is not known but is believed to be stable. "The northern Cordillera Vilcabamba is one of the most intact areas of Peru, mostly owing to its remoteness and lack of human habitation. However, remote sensing data suggest increasing human encroachment into the range and likely conversion of forests for agriculture, as evidenced by small-scale logging of forests in particular in lower elevations."
