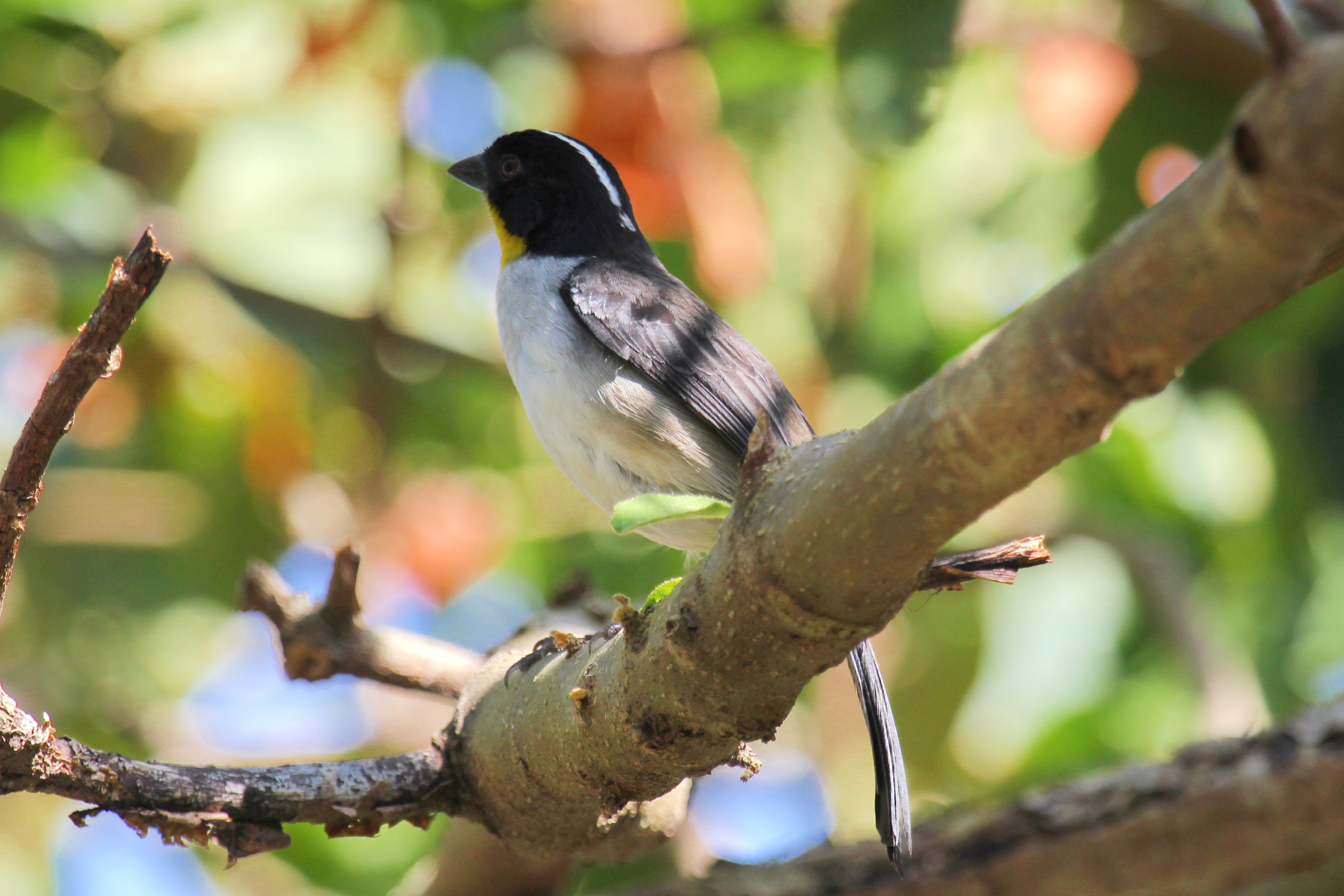

Conservation status
- Least Concern (IUCN 3.1)

Scientific classification
- Kingdom: Animalia
- Phylum: Chordata
- Class: Aves
- Order: Passeriformes
- Family: Passerellidae
- Genus: Atlapetes
- Species: A. albinucha

Binomial name
- Atlapetes albinucha (d'Orbigny & Lafresnaye, 1838)

Synonyms
- see text

= White-naped brushfinch =

Species of bird

The white-naped brushfinch (Atlapetes albinucha), also known as the yellow-throated brushfinch, is a species of bird in the family Passerellidae, the New World sparrows. It is found from Mexico to Ecuador.

== Taxonomy and systematics ==
The white-naped brushfinch was formally described in 1838 with the binomial Embernagra albinucha. Subsequent authors placed it in genus Buarremon or Arremon before it was assigned to its present Atlapetes.

The white-naped brushfinch's further taxonomy is unsettled. The IOC and AviList assign it these seven subspecies:

- A. a. albinucha (d'Orbigny & Lafresnaye, 1838)
- A. a. griseipectus Dwight & Griscom, 1921
- A. a. fuscipygius Dwight & Griscom, 1921
- A. a. parvirostris Dwight & Griscom, 1921
- A. a. brunnescens Chapman, 1915
- A. a. azuerensis Aldrich, 1937
- A. a. gutturalis (Lafresnaye, 1843)

However, as of late 2025 the Clements taxonomy and BirdLife International's Handbook of the Birds of the World add an eighth, A. a. coloratus (Griscom, 1924), that the IOC and AviList include in A. a. brunnescens.

For most of the twentieth century all of the subspecies except the nominate A. a. albinucha were treated as subspecies within the binomial Atlapetes gutturalis, the "yellow-throated brush-finch". The two differ mainly in their breast color but there is some genetic evidence that supports treating A. a. albinucha as a monotypic species and the others as a separate polytypic species. Clements recognizes the distinction, calling A. a. albinucha the "white-naped brushfinch (white-naped) and the others the "white-naped brushfinch (yellow-throated) A. albinucha (gutturalis group)".

This article follows the seven-subspecies model.

== Description ==
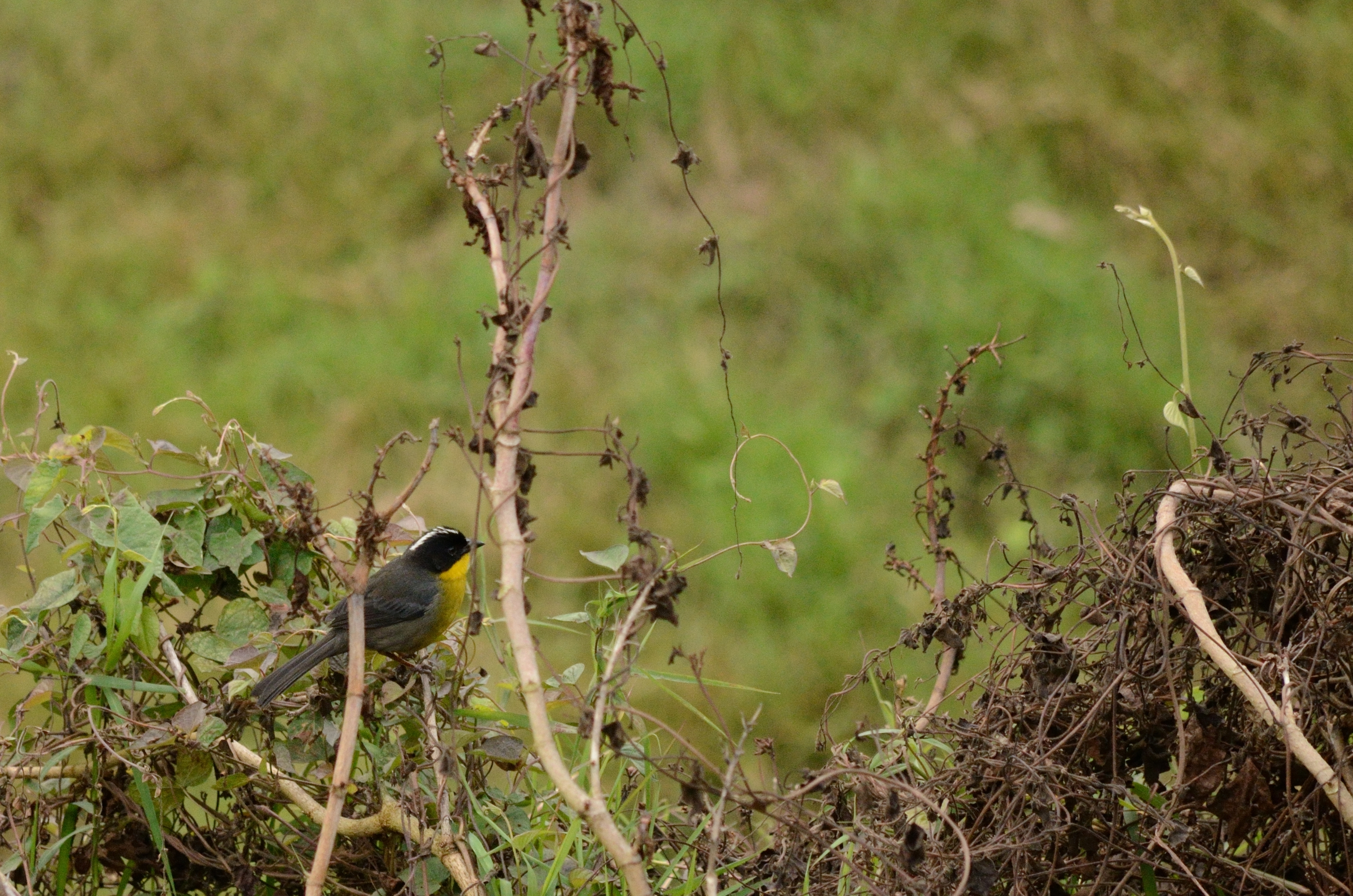
Nominate subspecies A. a. albinucha

The white-naped brushfinch is 17 to 21 cm (6.7 to 8.3 in) long and weighs 31 to 37 g (1.1 to 1.3 oz). The sexes have the same plumage. Adults of the nominate subspecies have a mostly black head with a wide white stripe in the middle of the crown that continues onto the nape. Their upperparts, wings, and tail are dark slaty gray with a slight olive tinge. Their throat and underparts are yellow with a dusky yellowish gray wash on the flanks. Juveniles have a medium sooty brown head and dark sooty brown upperparts, dark streaks on the breast, and a brownish cinnamon wash on the flanks.

The other subspecies all have gray underparts below their yellow throat. They otherwise differ from the nominate and each other thus:

- A. a. griseipectus: lighter and more olive upperparts and lighter yellow throat than nominate
- A. a. fuscipygius: browner than all others with a thin white crown stripe
- A. a. gutturalis: largest subspecies; whitish gray underparts with olive-gray flanks and vent
- A. a. parvirostris: like gutturalis but darker gray upperparts and paler yellow throat
- A. a. brunnescens: browner than gutturalis with thin crown stripe and buffy brown flanks and vent
- A. a. azuerensis: dark brown upperparts, darker gray breast band, and reddish brown flanks and vent

All subspecies have a red-brown to dark brown iris, a blackish bill, and pinkish to dark gray-brown legs and feet.

== Distribution and habitat ==
The white-named brushfinch has a disjunct distribution; even some subspecies have gaps within their ranges. The subspecies are found thus:

- A. a. albinucha: "Caribbean slope of Mexico from Puebla and Veracruz south to Oaxaca and Chiapas"
- A. a. griseipectus: from southwestern Chiapas south through western Guatemala into El Salvador
- A. a. fuscipygius: much of Honduras; northwestern El Salvador; northwestern Nicaragua
- A. a. parvirostris: Costa Rica's Cordillera de Guanacaste, Cordillera Central, and Cordillera de Talamanca
- A. a. brunnescens: western Panama's Chiriquí Province
- A. a. azuerensis: southern Panama's Azuero Peninsula
- A. a. gutturalis: all three ranges of the Colombian Andes and south into northern Ecuador's Sucumbíos and northern Napo provinces

The species was first documented in Ecuador in a 2013 publication.

Overall the white-naped brushfinch inhabits the edges of montane evergreen forest, pine-oak forest, secondary forest, and scrublands in the subtropical and lower temperate zones. In northern Central America (Guatemala, El Salvador, and Honduras) it favors forest edges and clearings. In Costa Rica it inhabits "second growth, weedy open areas, and forest edges" and in Colombia the "understory of shrubby montane forest and woodland". Sources differ on its overall elevational range. One states it is 1,000 to 3,350 m (3,300 to 11,000 ft) and another 1,200 to 3,150 m (3,900 to 10,300 ft). A third says it is 750 to 3,000 m (2,500 to 9,800 ft) from Mexico to Panama. A field guide to northern Central America places it between 900 and 3,100 m (3,000 and 10,200 ft) there. It ranges mostly between 900 and 2,000 m (3,000 and 6,600 ft) and rarely higher in Costa Rica and between 1,500 and 2,500 m (4,900 and 8,200 ft) in Colombia.

== Behavior ==
=== Movement ===
The white-naped brushfinch is a year-round resident.

=== Feeding ===
The white-naped brushfinch feeds on insects and seeds. It forages singly and in pairs. It forages on the ground, where it turns over leaf litter, and not far above the ground in vegetation. It sometimes attends army ant swarms.

=== Breeding ===
The white-naped brushfinch's breeding season has not been defined. However, it includes April in Oaxaca, spans April to July in Costa Rica and Panama, and spans March to September in Colombia. Its nest is a large cup made from twigs, grass, and leaves lined with finer material like pine needles. It is sometimes on the ground but more often in dense vegetation between about 0.6 and 3 m (2 and 10 ft) above it. The clutch is one to three eggs but usually two or three; the eggs are plain white. The incubation period, time to fledging, and details of parental care are not known.

=== Vocalization ===
The white-naped brushfinch's song is "a series of high-pitched notes and trills: tseee'up-tseee'ew-ti'ti'ti'ti'ti'ti'ti....

== Status ==
The IUCN has assessed the white-naped brushfinch as being of Least Concern. It has a large range; its estimated population of at least 50,000 mature individuals is believed to be decreasing. No immediate threats have been identified. It is considered common to fairly common in Mexico and fairly common in northern Central America, Costa Rica, and Colombia.
