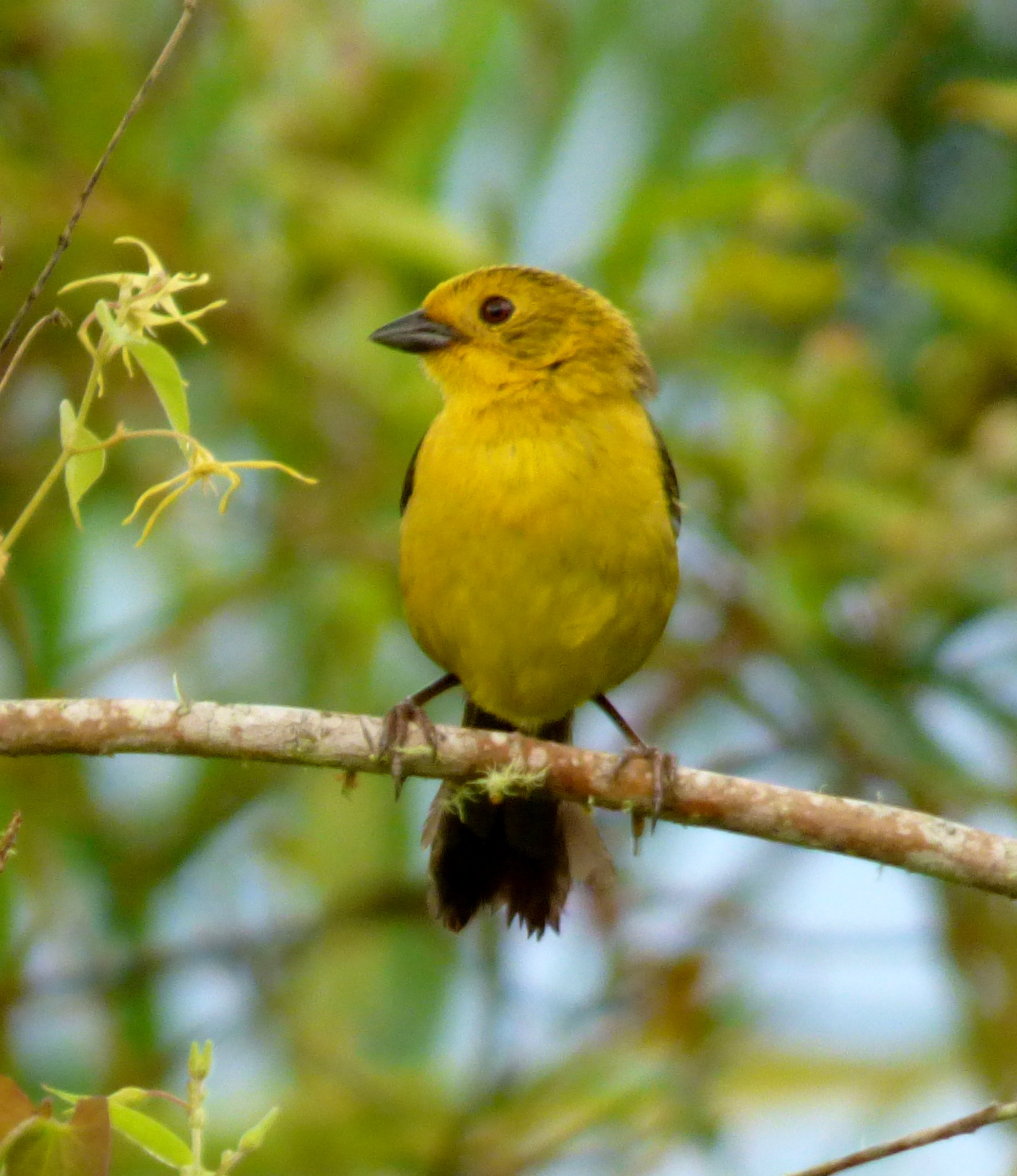

Conservation status
- Near Threatened (IUCN 3.1)

Scientific classification
- Kingdom: Animalia
- Phylum: Chordata
- Class: Aves
- Order: Passeriformes
- Family: Passerellidae
- Genus: Atlapetes
- Species: A. flaviceps

Binomial name
- Atlapetes flaviceps Chapman, 1912

= Yellow-headed brushfinch =

Species of bird

The yellow-headed brushfinch (Atlapetes flaviceps) is a Near Threatened species of bird in the American sparrow family, Passerellidae. It is endemic to Colombia. The common name is a semi-literal translation of the scientific name, with Atlapetes referring to the brushfinch genus, and flaviceps meaning "yellow-headed".

This species has a yellow to dark olive head. The throat, chin, malar streak, lores, eye-ring, and ear patch are bright yellow in any case. The rest of the plumage is yellow with dark olive upperparts, wing and tail. The variation in the head color is not well explained, but it is likely that the olive-headed individuals are females and/or immature birds.

== Common name ==
It is sometimes still referred to by its obsolete common name, olive-headed brushfinch. That name is the result of an interesting error. A. flaviceps occurs in a very limited range, and is rare. Until the 1980s, it was known only from the two specimens collected on October 24 and 25, 1911, in the Toché River valley, and two additional specimens collected in 1942. Though the exact amount and brightness was variable in the few specimens, the bright yellow head of these birds was noted. It did not receive a standardized common name due to its rarity however, being only known to a few ornithologists for which the scientific name was sufficient. That name, however, duly referenced the striking color of the type specimen, an adult male.

In 1987, the first photograph of a living A. flaviceps was published. It showed a bird with very little yellow on the head, and altogether gave the impression that this species had a mainly dusky olive head. Widely distributed in a popular field guide, this photo led to the misleading common name, in use since the mid-20th century, becoming firmly established.

When the species was rediscovered at the type locality in 1989, it was noted that some birds had the mainly dusky olive head seen in the photograph. But as far as can be told, at least the adult males have the largely bright yellow head that was referenced in the original description of this species. Thus, BirdLife International chose the common name "yellow-headed brushfinch" in 1992, and the AOU eventually followed suit.

== Distribution and ecology ==
This bird was encountered in the La Plata Vieja Valley in Huila Department in 1967, but the only recent records are from the upper Coello River basin in Tolima Department (the Toché River is one of the main tributaries of the Coello River). Namely, it is found between 1,000 and 2,500 meters ASL in Cajamarca, Ibagué and Roncesvalles and perhaps Rovira municipalities, in the upper reaches of the Anaime, Cocora, Combeima and Toché river valleys.

It remains locally common in thick secondary vegetation and degraded forest, bordering gallery forest and arracacha (Arracacia xanthorriza) and granadilla (Passiflora species) plantations. The yellow-headed brush finch has been observed to take part in mixed-species feeding flocks together with the common bush-tanager (Chlorospingus ophthalmicus), white-throated tyrannulet (Mecocerculus leucophrys), golden-fronted whitestart (Myioborus ornatus), blue-and-black tanager (Tangara vassorii), blue-capped tanager (Thraupis cyanocephala) and fawn-breasted tanager (Pipraeidea melanonota). It is threatened by habitat loss; most areas in the inter-Andean valleys of Colombia have already been converted to agricultural land. The total population is believed to be at least 250 but not more than 1,000 adult birds.
