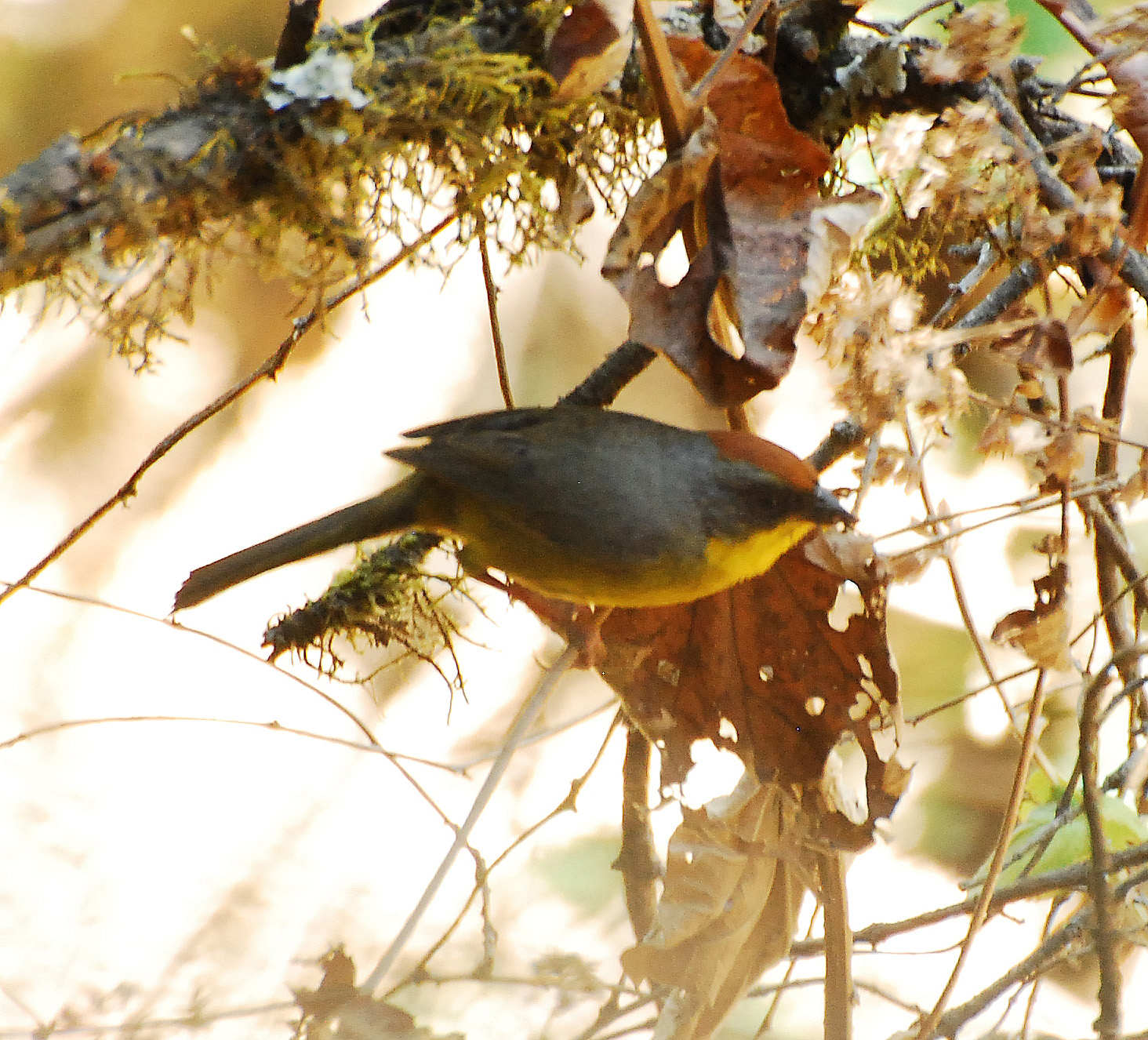
- Rufous-capped brushfinch, Atlapetes pileatus

Scientific classification
- Kingdom: Animalia
- Phylum: Chordata
- Class: Aves
- Order: Passeriformes
- Family: Passerellidae
- Genus: Atlapetes; Wagler, 1831

Type species
- Atlapetes pileatus Wagler, 1831

Species
- see text

= Atlapetes =

Genus of birds

Atlapetes is a genus of birds in the New World sparrow family Passerellidae. The species are mainly found in montane forest from Mexico to northwestern Argentina.

== Taxonomy and species ==
The genus Atlapetes was introduced in 1831 by the German naturalist Johann Georg Wagler to accommodate the rufous-capped brushfinch (Atlapetes pileatus). The genus name is from Ancient Greek and combines the mythical figure Atlas (Ἄτλας) with πετης (petēs), meaning "flyer". Within the New World sparrow family Passerellidae, the genus Atlapetes is sister to the genus Pipilo.

The genus contains the following 33 species:

Image	Common name	Scientific name	Distribution
	Rufous-capped brushfinch	Atlapetes pileatus	montane Mexico
	White-naped brushfinch	Atlapetes albinucha	highlands of eastern Mexico to Colombia
	Yellow-thighed brushfinch	Atlapetes tibialis	Talamancan montane forests
	Yellow-green brushfinch	Atlapetes luteoviridis	montane Panama
	Moustached brushfinch	Atlapetes albofrenatus	Cordillera Oriental (Colombia)
	Santa Marta brushfinch	Atlapetes melanocephalus	Sierra Nevada de Santa Marta
	Ochre-breasted brushfinch	Atlapetes semirufus	montane eastern Colombia end Venezuela
	Yellow-headed brushfinch	Atlapetes flaviceps	Magdalena River valley
	Dusky-headed brushfinch	Atlapetes fuscoolivaceus	southwestern Colombia
	White-rimmed brushfinch	Atlapetes leucopis	Ande of southern Colombia and eastern Ecuador
	White-headed brushfinch	Atlapetes albiceps	southwestern Ecuador and northwestern Peru
	Rufous-eared brushfinch	Atlapetes rufigenis	Andes of northwestern Peru
	Choco brushfinch	Atlapetes crassus	western slope of Andes of Colombia and Ecuador
	Tricolored brushfinch	Atlapetes tricolor	eastern Peruvian Andes
	Slaty brushfinch	Atlapetes schistaceus	Andes of Colombia, Venezuela and Ecuador
	Taczanowski's brushfinch	Atlapetes taczanowskii	Ande of central Peru
	Pale-naped brushfinch	Atlapetes pallidinucha	Andes of Colombia and Ecuador
	Antioquia brushfinch	Atlapetes blancae	Antioquia
	Yellow-breasted brushfinch	Atlapetes latinuchus	Andes of Colombia to northern Peru
	Black-fronted brushfinch	Atlapetes nigrifrons	Serranía del Perijá
	White-winged brushfinch	Atlapetes leucopterus	Ecuador and northern Peru
	Pale-headed brushfinch	Atlapetes pallidiceps	south-central Ecuador
	Bay-crowned brushfinch	Atlapetes seebohmi	southwestern Ecuador and northern Peru
	Rusty-bellied brushfinch	Atlapetes nationi	southwestern Peru
	Apurimac brushfinch	Atlapetes forbesi	Andes of south-central Peru
	Black-spectacled brushfinch	Atlapetes melanopsis	Andes of southeastern Peru
	Vilcabamba brushfinch	Atlapetes terborghi	Cordillera Vilcabamba
	Cuzco brushfinch	Atlapetes canigenis	Andes of southeastern Peru
	Grey-eared brushfinch	Atlapetes melanolaemus	Andes of southeastern Peru and Bolivia
	Bolivian brushfinch	Atlapetes rufinucha	Bolivian Andes
	Fulvous-headed brushfinch	Atlapetes fulviceps	Andes of Bolivia and northwestern Argentina
	Yellow-striped brushfinch	Atlapetes citrinellus	Andes of northwestern Argentina
