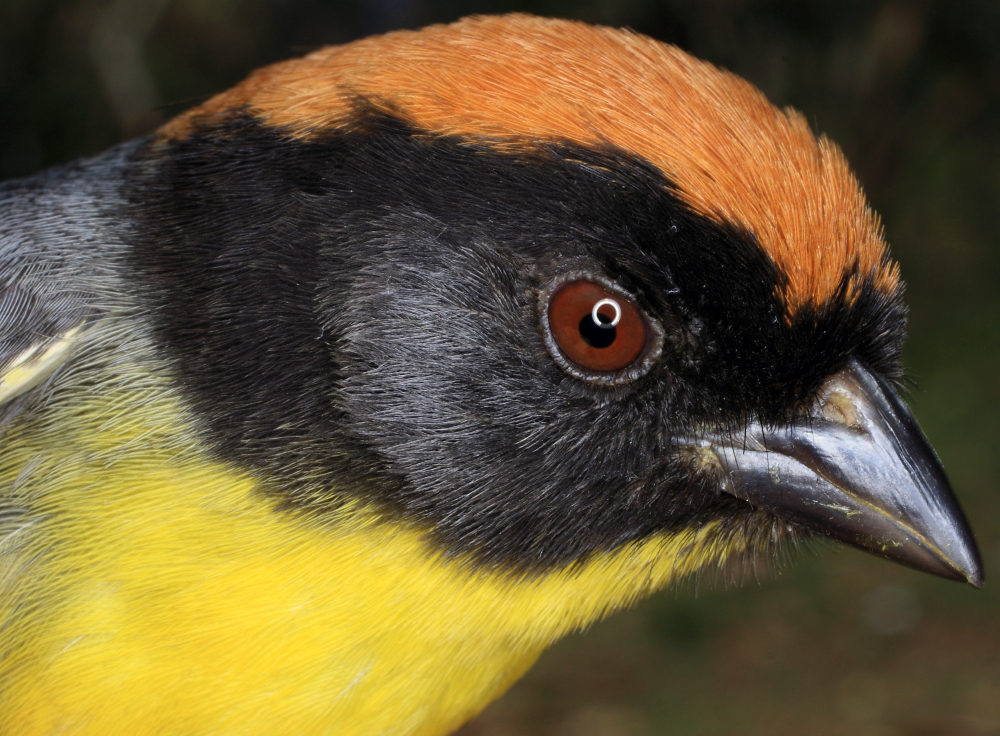

Conservation status
- Least Concern (IUCN 3.1)

Scientific classification
- Kingdom: Animalia
- Phylum: Chordata
- Class: Aves
- Order: Passeriformes
- Family: Passerellidae
- Genus: Atlapetes
- Species: A. nigrifrons

Binomial name
- Atlapetes nigrifrons Phelps, WH & Gilliard, 1940

= Black-fronted brushfinch =

Species of bird

The black-fronted brushfinch (Atlapetes nigrifrons) is a species of bird in the family Passerellidae, the New World sparrows. It is found in Colombia and Venezuela.

== Taxonomy and systematics ==
The black-fronted brushfinch was formally described in 1940 as a subspecies of the rufous-naped brushfinch with the trinomial Atlapetes rufinucha nigrifrons. The IOC recognized it as a full species in 2015. BirdLife International's Handbook of the Birds of the World did so in 2016 and the Clements taxonomy in 2025. The first version of AviList in 2025 also included it. Since the separation, they call the now-reduced A. rufinucha the yellow-breasted brushfinch. However, as of February 2026 the independent South American Classification Committee retains nigrifrons as a subspecies of A. rufinucha, but is seeking a proposal to reevaluate the decision.

The black-fronted brushfinch is monotypic.

== Description ==
The black-fronted brushfinch is about 17 cm (6.7 in) long. The sexes have the same plumage. Adults have a black forehead ("front") and a rufous to orange crown and nape. Their face is mostly black with a faint dark slaty wash on the cheeks. Their upperparts are dark slaty gray and their wings and tail are slightly darker. The wing's outer primaries have thin white edges and all primaries have white bases. Their throat, breast, belly, and undertail coverts are yellow and the sides of the breast and flanks have an olive or grayish wash. They have a deep reddish brown iris, a black bill, and brownish to dusky gray legs and feet. Juveniles have an olive gray head with a grayish cheek and no rufous. Their upper- and underparts are like the adult's.

== Distribution and habitat ==
The black-fronted brushfinch is found only in the Serranía de Perijá, which straddles the border of northern Colombia and western Venezuela. It inhabits humid montane forest where it prefers shrubby edges and second growth forest and appears to tolerate disturbed habitats. In elevation it ranges between 1,100 and 2,200 m (3,600 and 7,200 ft) in Venezuela and between 1,400 and 2,500 m (4,600 and 8,200 ft) in Colombia.

== Behavior ==
=== Movement ===
The black-fronted brushfinch is a year-round resident.

=== Feeding ===
The black-fronted brushfinch's diet and foraging behavior have not been described but are believed to be similar those of the yellow-breasted brushfinch, which see here.

=== Breeding ===
Observers have noted adult black-fronted brushfinches in breeding condition between January and June and have seen juveniles in August. Nothing else is known about the species' breeding biology.

=== Vocalization ===
One black-fronted brushfinch song "[s]tarts with a series of chip or tink-like notes at a pace of around 2–3/s, followed by 1–2 faster and usually lower-pitched trill series". It is usually sung at dawn. Another, sung throughout the day, is a "short, simple song that starts out with a single downslurred note from 7 to 3 kHz, followed by a series of 2–4 notes in series that are most often downslurred". Excited pairs make "very high-pitched, upslurred tsweet notes that grade into longer, finely modulated buzzes that descend slightly before finishing off with a lower-pitched chatter". The species' calls include chip, seet, and swit.

== Status ==
The IUCN originally assessed the black-fronted brushfinch in 2016 as Near Threatened but since 2022 as being of Least Concern. It has restricted range of about 4,500 km^{2} (1,700 sq mi) of which it actually occupies about 3,200 km^{2} (1,200 sq mi). Its estimated population of between 2500 and 10,000 mature individuals is believed to be stable. "At lower altitudes, habitat is under threat from a range of processes, including small-scale logging for colonisation, agricultural cultivation, ranching and mineral exploitation. This species' range in higher altitudes however currently remains less affected by these factors as large areas of forests still persist. Moreover, the species' tolerance of open, bushy and disturbed habitat suggests that it is not experiencing a decline in habitat quality." Though a 2006 field guide calls it common in Venezuela the few more recent records may require a new evaluation. It is known from only a few sites in Colombia.
