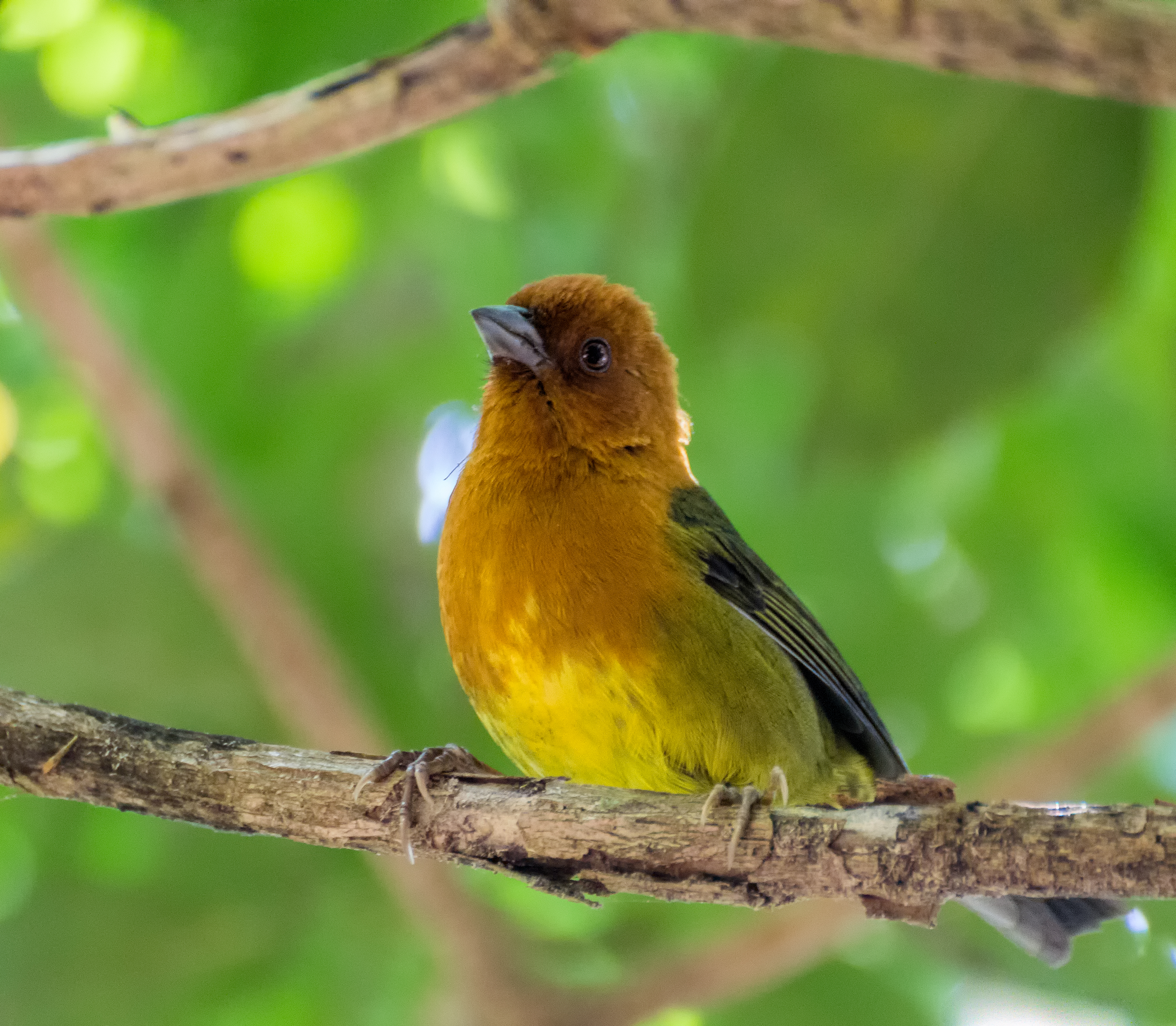

Conservation status
- Least Concern (IUCN 3.1)

Scientific classification
- Kingdom: Animalia
- Phylum: Chordata
- Class: Aves
- Order: Passeriformes
- Family: Passerellidae
- Genus: Atlapetes
- Species: A. semirufus

Binomial name
- Atlapetes semirufus (Boissonneau, 1840)

= Ochre-breasted brushfinch =

Species of bird

The ochre-breasted brushfinch (Atlapetes semirufus) is a species of bird in the family Passerellidae. It is endemic to the northern Andes, occurring in Colombia and Venezuela. In Colombia, it inhabits elevations of 1,600–3,500 meters, while in Venezuela it is found between 600–2,700 meters. The species is present in several national parks and is not currently considered to face immediate conservation threats. Although relatively common, its breeding biology and life history remain poorly understood, and the population is believed to be in decline.

== Taxonomy ==
In 1840 Boissonneau, a French ornithologist and ocularist, first described the Atlapetes semirufus as a bird species in the family Passerellidae found in the montane forests in Colombia and Venezuela, where it occupies subtropical moist environments. This species was first described under the original name Tanagra (Arremon) semirufus.

== Description ==
The ochre-breasted brushfinch measures approximately 18 cm in length and weighs between 29–33 g. It is a slim brushfinch with a finely tipped, pointed bill. Adults display a plain tawny-orange coloration from the head to the breast, olive upperparts including wings and tail, and yellowish underparts with a greenish wash on the flanks. The iris is chestnut, the bill is grey, and the legs range from pinkish to dusky grey. Both sexes appear similar.

Juveniles are brownish-olive above, including the head, and dull yellowish below, with olive-toned chests and narrow dark streaking from the breast to the undertail coverts. They often show a darker malar stripe. Older immatures exhibit intermediate plumage, with patchy tawny on the face and a fully tawny breast developing early.

== Vocalization and Behavior ==
The species is typically observed in pairs. Its song is heard primarily in the early morning during the onset of the rainy season. Vocalizations include rapid sequences such as “wheet-wheet, tsu-tsu-tsu” or “pi-pit, chew chew chew!”

== Geographic Variation ==
Six recognized subspecies exhibit notable geographic variation in plumage coloration, ranging from darker forms to paler variants with nearly white throats and pale yellowish breasts. The ochre-breasted brushfinch forms a superspecies with the Tepui brushfinch (Atlapetes personatus), and both are among the few brushfinches lacking blackish coloration on the head.

== Breeding ==
The breeding season begins in March, at the end of the dry season, and continues through July, into the middle of the rainy season. The earliest recorded nest, found on 21 March, contained two fresh eggs. Peak breeding activity occurs from late April to late May.

== Sexual Differences ==
Sexes are not accurately identified by their feathers. Behavioral observations, video recordings, and mist-netting data suggest that only females build nests and incubate eggs. During nest construction, pairs remain together, but only one bird gathers nesting materials while the other trails behind, keeping watch. Only females were found to have developed brood patches.

== Conservation status ==
The species is not globally threatened. It is considered uncommon in Colombia and fairly common in Venezuela. It occupies a reasonably broad range, with no current evidence of significant population declines or major threats to its habitat.
