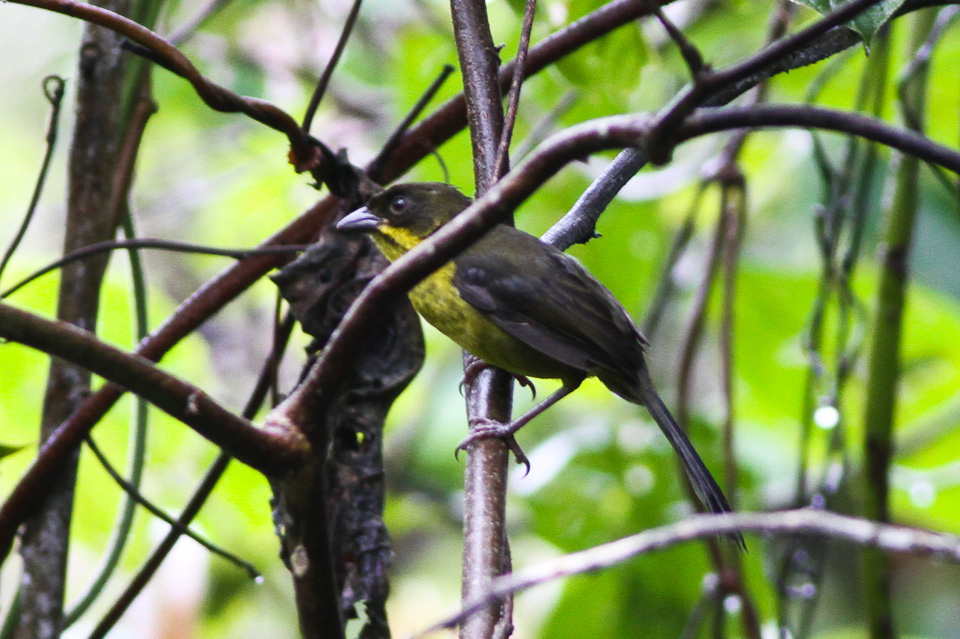

Conservation status
- Near Threatened (IUCN 3.1)

Scientific classification
- Kingdom: Animalia
- Phylum: Chordata
- Class: Aves
- Order: Passeriformes
- Family: Passerellidae
- Genus: Atlapetes
- Species: A. fuscoolivaceus

Binomial name
- Atlapetes fuscoolivaceus Chapman, 1914

= Dusky-headed brushfinch =

Species of bird

The dusky-headed brushfinch (Atlapetes fuscoolivaceus) is a Near Threatened species of bird in the family Emberizidae, the New World sparrows. It is endemic to Colombia.

== Taxonomy and systematics ==
The dusky-headed brushfinch was formally described in 1914 with the binomial Atlapetes fusco-olivaceus. It is monotypic.

== Description ==
The dusky-headed brushfinch is 17 to 18 cm (6.7 to 7.1 in) long; two males weighed an average of 32.5 g (1.1 oz). The sexes have the same plumage. Adults have a mostly dusky olive head with a yellow "moustache" and a yellow throat. Their nape and upperparts are olive-dusky with a slightly brighter olive rump. Their tail and wings are a slightly darker olive-dusky with thin olive edges on the flight feathers. Their underparts are mostly yellow with an olive wash on the breast and flanks. They have a reddish to deep brown iris, a black bill, and dusky brown legs and feet. Juveniles have a paler face than adults, an olive wash on the moustache, and dim dark streaks on the underparts.

== Distribution and habitat ==
The dusky-headed brushfinch is found in the upper watershed of the Magdalena River in southwestern Colombia's Huila Department. It inhabits low dense shrubs at the edges and in clearings of humid forest, low-stature secondary forest, and more open areas such as overgrown pastures. In elevation it ranges between 1,500 and 2,400 m (4,900 and 7,900 ft).

== Behavior ==
=== Movement ===
The dusky-headed brushfinch is a year-round resident.

=== Feeding ===
The dusky-headed brushfinch's diet has not been studied. It usually forages in pairs or small groups, moving through dense foliage on the ground and up to about 6 m (20 ft) above it.

=== Breeding ===
The dusky-headed brushfinch's breeding season spans at least February to April. Nothing else is known about the species' breeding biology.

=== Vocalization ===
The dusky-headed brushfinch sings a "springy and bouncy" series of "swee-see chipi" notes. Pairs duet with a "multi-parted series...e.g. ti-ti-ti-ti-ti-ti, tch-tch-tch-tch-tch, chew chew chew". The species' call is "a high seep".

== Status ==
The IUCN has assessed the dusky-headed brushfinch as Near Threatened. It has a small range that is believed to have shrunk from historical levels; its population size is not known and is believed to be decreasing. "Although it is tolerant of some habitat degradation, the head of the Magdalena valley is now characterised by unsuitable and extensive coffee, banana and sugarcane plantations." It is considered locally common in its small range.
