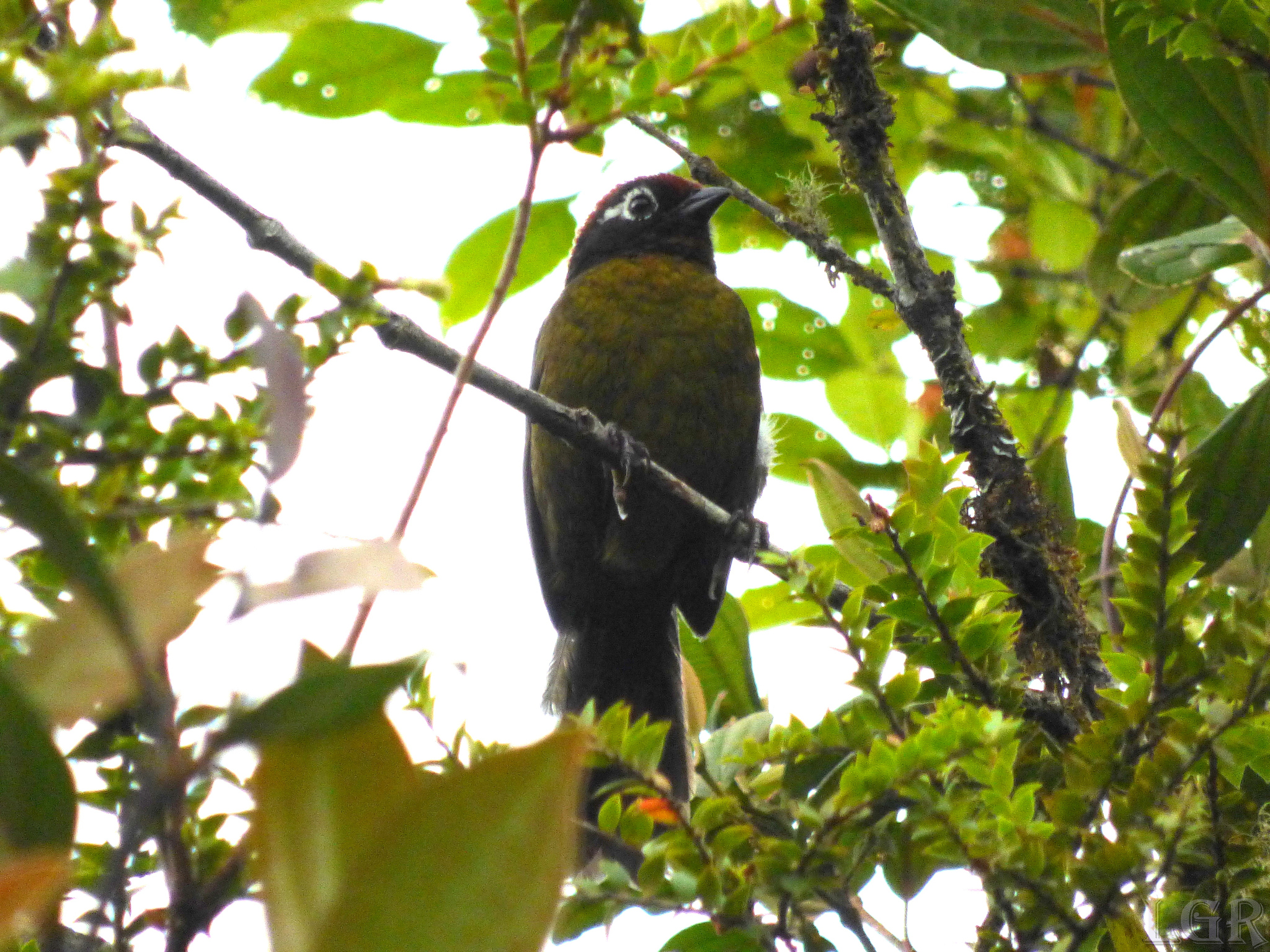

Conservation status
- Least Concern (IUCN 3.1)

Scientific classification
- Kingdom: Animalia
- Phylum: Chordata
- Class: Aves
- Order: Passeriformes
- Family: Passerellidae
- Genus: Atlapetes
- Species: A. leucopis

Binomial name
- Atlapetes leucopis (Sclater, PL & Salvin, 1878)

= White-rimmed brushfinch =

Species of bird

The white-rimmed brushfinch (Atlapetes leucopis) is a species of bird in the family Passerellidae, the New World sparrows. It is found in Colombia and Ecuador.

== Taxonomy and systematics ==
The white-rimmed brushfinch was formally described in 1878 with the binomial Buarremon leucopis. In the early twentieth century genus Buarremon was merged into Atlapetes.

The white-rimmed brushfinch is monotypic. However, some authors have treated the choco brushfinch (A. crassus) as a subspecies of it.

== Description ==
The white-rimmed brushfinch is about 18 cm (7.1 in) long. The sexes have the same plumage. Adults have a large dark rusty crown, hindcrown, and upper nape and a white ring around the eye that extends to the rear in a teardrop shape. The rest of their face is black. Their upperparts, wings, and tail are mostly blackish gray with a hint of olive on the rump and uppertail coverts. Their throat is dark gray, their underparts dark olive with obscure darker mottling on the breast, and slightly darker olive flanks and undertail coverts. They have a dark brown iris, a blackish bill, and dull pinkish to dusky gray legs and feet. Juveniles have an olive wash on their crown. Their underparts have significant dark barring on the throat and breast and ill-defined streaks on the belly.

== Distribution and habitat ==
The white-rimmed brushfinch is found in Colombia in the Central Andes from Huila Department south and on the eastern side of the Eastern Andes from Caquetá Department south. Its range continues into Ecuador on the Andean western slope to Imbabura Province and on the eastern slope to Napo Province. There are also small populations further south in Azuay, Morona-Santiago, and Loja provinces. It inhabits dense undergrowth in the interior and edges of wet forest where it favors a mix of thickets and low woodland. In elevation it ranges between 2,100 and 3,000 m (6,900 and 9,800 ft) in Colombia and between 2,200 and 3,100 m (7,200 and 10,200 ft) in Ecuador.

== Behavior ==
=== Movement ===
The white-rimmed brushfinch is a year-round resident.

=== Feeding ===
The white-rimmed brushfinch's diet has not been studied but is known to include berries. It usually forages in singly, in pairs, or small groups, moving through dense foliage on the ground and up to about 5 m (15 ft) above it. It sometimes joins mixed-species feeding flocks.

=== Breeding ===
The white-rimmed brushfinch's breeding season spans at least October to December. Two nests have been described. One was a ball of moss with a side entrance placed in a branch fork about 8 m (25 ft) above the ground. The other was a cup made from twigs and grass. It was in cavity in earth at the bottom of a landslide; it held one egg that was greenish cream with reddish blotches. The incubation period, time to fledging, and details of parental care are not known.

=== Vocalization ===
The white-rimmed brushfinch's song has been described as "a forceful series of pretty and melodic notes and phrases, often including repetitions". A more detailed description is "a slowly delivered series of 4–15 strident notes, either upslurred or downslurred whistles, varying from swee twuu twuu twuu to a longer swee swee chewit chewit chewit tweew tweew chu chu". It also makes "a rambling duet which includes many sweet whistles, trills and more complex notes" and a "high-pitched zeee" contact call.

== Status ==
The IUCN originally in 1994 assessed the white-rimmed brushfinch as Near Threatened but since 2000 as being of Least Concern. It has a small range; its population size is not known but is believed to be stable. No immediate threats have been identified. It is considered uncommon in Colombia and very local in Ecuador. "Abundant landslides occur in areas occupied by this brush-finch, and these may create the habitat mosaic it prefers."
