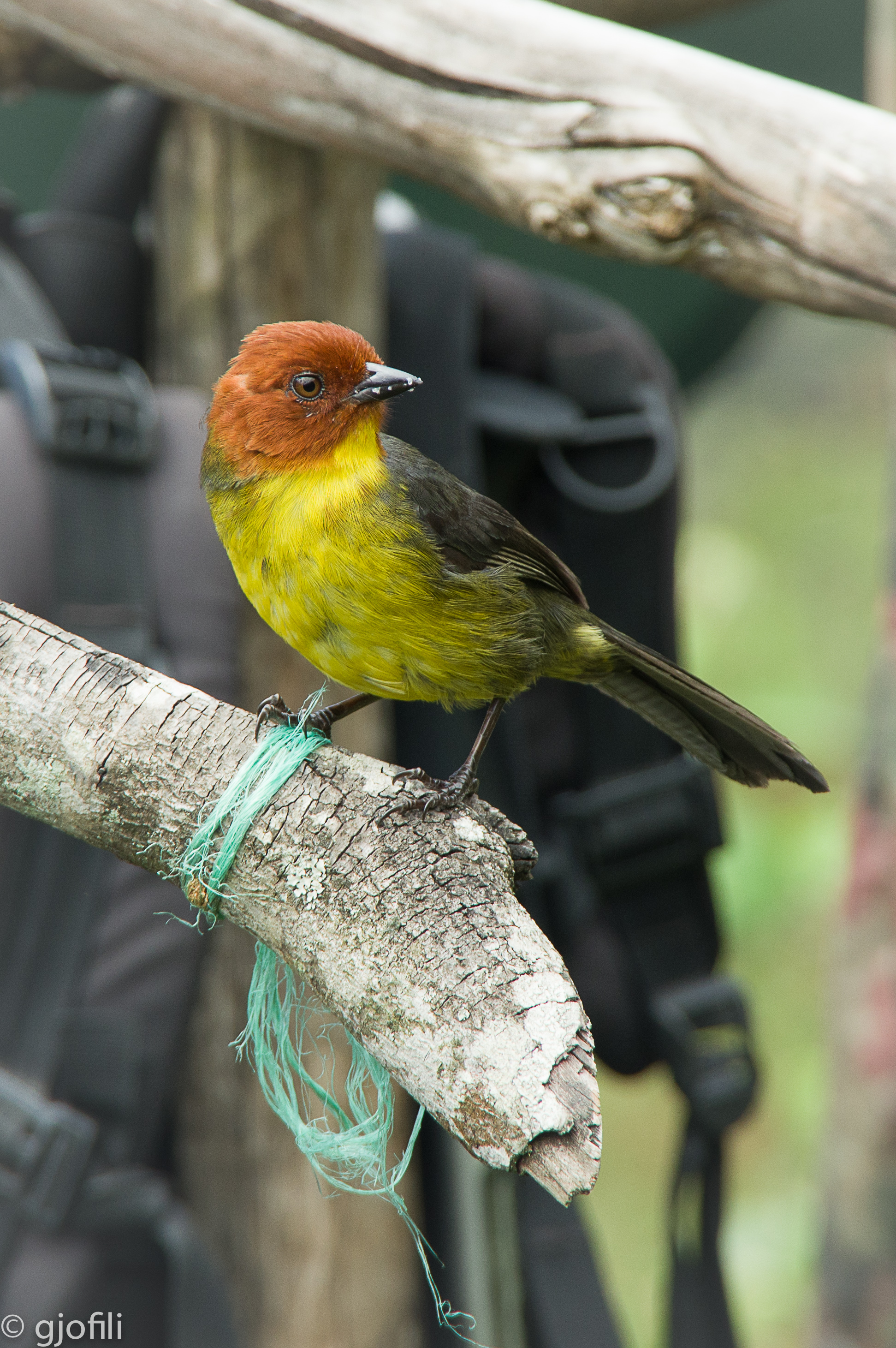
- A. p. personatus

Conservation status
- Least Concern (IUCN 3.1)

Scientific classification
- Kingdom: Animalia
- Phylum: Chordata
- Class: Aves
- Order: Passeriformes
- Family: Passerellidae
- Genus: Atlapetes
- Species: A. personatus

Binomial name
- Atlapetes personatus (Cabanis, 1849)

= Tepui brushfinch =

Species of bird

The tepui brushfinch (Atlapetes personatus) is a species of bird in the family Passerellidae, the New World sparrows. It is found in Brazil, Guyana, and Venezuela.

== Taxonomy and systematics ==
The tepui brushfinch was formally described in 1849 with the binomial Arremon personatus. By the early twentieth century, when multiple subspecies were described, it had been reassigned to its present genus Atlapetes.

The tepui brushfinch has these six subspecies:

- A. p. personatus (Cabanis, 1849)
- A. p. collaris Chapman, 1939
- A. p. duidae Chapman, 1929
- A. p. parui Phelps, WH & Phelps, WH Jr, 1950
- A. p. paraquensis Phelps, WH & Phelps, WH Jr, 1946
- A. p. jugularis Phelps, WH & Phelps, WH Jr, 1955

== Description ==
The tepui brushfinch is 17 to 18 cm (6.7 to 7.1 in) long and weighs 29 to 37 g (1.0 to 1.3 oz). The sexes have the same plumage. Adults of the nominate subspecies A. p. personatus have a mostly cinnamon rufous head with a yellow throat. Their upperparts, wings, and tail are mostly gray with an olive wash; their wing coverts and flight feathers are slightly more blackish. Their breast and belly are yellow and their flanks, vent, and undertail coverts are dusky olive. Juveniles have a brownish gray head and slightly browner upperparts than adults.

The other subspecies differ from the nominate and each other thus:

- A. p. collaris: deeper chestnut head than nominate and chestnut flecks on the breast
- A. p. duidae: black back, wings, and tail and chestnut throat and breast
- A. p. parui: black back, wings, and tail and darker chestnut throat and breast than duidae
- A. p. paraquensis: blackish forecrown and chin, black back, wings, and tail, and chestnut throat
- A. p. jugularis: black back, olivaceous tinged uppertail coverts, palish rufous throat, and chestnut breast

All subspecies have a chestnut iris, a dark brown to black bill, and blackish brown or dusky pink legs and feet.

== Distribution and habitat ==
The tepui brushfinch has an extremely disjunct distribution with each subspecies occurring on one or more separate tepuis. They are found thus:

- A. p. personatus: Mount Roraima and nearby tepuis where Venezuela's Bolívar state and western Guyana meet including Mount Ayanganna in Guyana (but see below)
- A. p. collaris: Auyán-tepui in southeastern Bolívar
- A. p. duidae: southern Venezuela on Cerro Duida and upper Ocamo River in Amazonas and several tepuis in west-central Bolívar
- A. p. parui: Cerro Parú in Venezuela's north-central Amazonas
- A. p. paraquensis: southern Venezuela on several tepuis in northwestern and northeastern Amazonas
- A. p. jugularis: Cerro de la Neblina in Venezuela's southeastern Amazonas and adjacent Brazilian Amazonas state (but see below)

Neither Birds of the World online nor Hilty's field guide include Brazil in the range of A. p. personatus. Both include Brazil in the range of A. p. jugularis. In contrast, a field guide to Brazilian birds states that A. p. personatus is the only subspecies confirmed in Brazil and that A. p. jugularis "may occur in extreme northern Amazonas". It also notes individual records along the Amazon River.

The tepui brushfinch inhabits the edges and understory of dense humid montane forest. On Sierra de Lema in Bolívar it favors secondary forest on white-sand soil dominated by Melastomaceae. On Cerro de la Neblina it appears to favor stands of bamboo. In Venezuela it ranges in elevation between 1,000 and 2,500 m (3,300 and 8,200 ft).

== Behavior ==
=== Movement ===
The tepui brushfinch is a year-round resident.

=== Feeding ===
The tepui brushfinch's diet has not been extensively studied but it is known to include insects, seeds, and fruits. It usually forages in pairs or family groups and sometimes joins mixed-species feeding flocks. It forages mostly from the forest's understory to its mid-story and also sometimes on the ground. It cocks or flips its tail while foraging.

=== Breeding ===
The tepui brushfinch's breeding season has not been defined but appears to span at least November to February. Nothing else is known about the species' breeding biology.

=== Vocalization ===
The tepui brushfinch sings "exuberant outbursts at dawn" but is generally somewhat quiet during the day. Its usual dawn song is "an unmusical speek! speek! speeu-TEE-tu'tu'tu". When they are excited, pairs sing in duet "ti'ti'ti'ti'ti'ti'ti'tio'ti'tsit'tsit'tsit'tsit'chi'chi'chi 'che'che'chewee-chewee".

== Status ==
The IUCN has assessed the tepui brushfinch as being of Least Concern. Its overall range is about 300,000 km^{2} (120,000 sq mi) but the area actually occupied within it is not known. Its population size is not known but is believed to be stable. No immediate threats have been identified. It is considered "widespread and common" in Venezuela. "At least in the short term, human activity probably has little effect on [the] Tepui Brushfinch, although it may be vulnerable in the long term to deforestation ."
