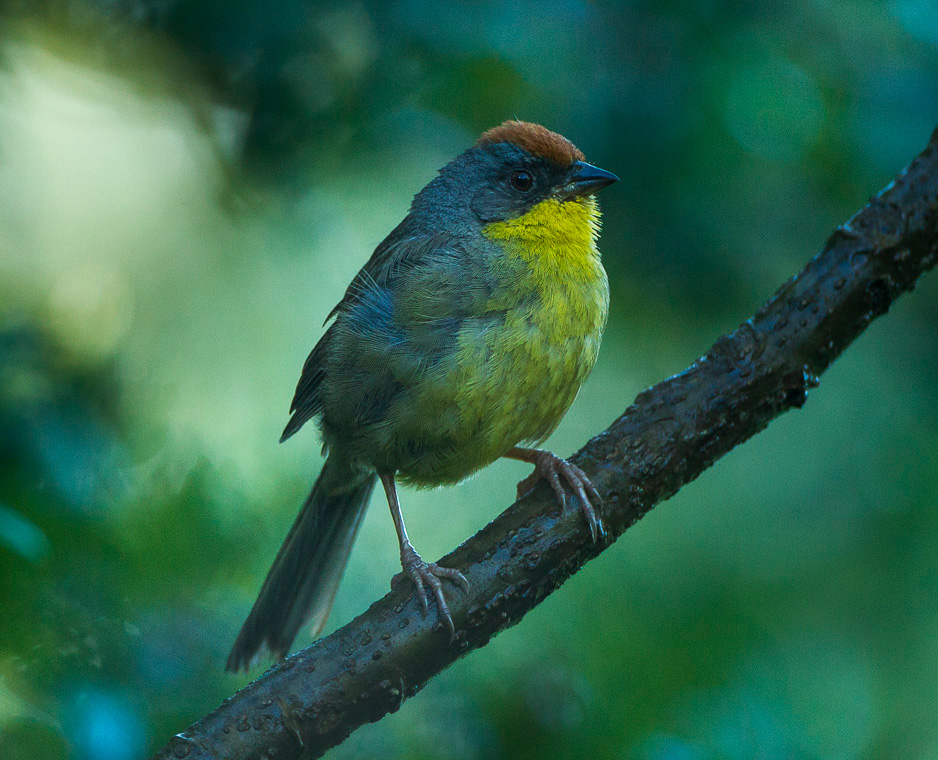

Conservation status
- Least Concern (IUCN 3.1)

Scientific classification
- Kingdom: Animalia
- Phylum: Chordata
- Class: Aves
- Order: Passeriformes
- Family: Passerellidae
- Genus: Atlapetes
- Species: A. pileatus

Binomial name
- Atlapetes pileatus Wagler, 1831

= Rufous-capped brushfinch =

Species of bird

The rufous-capped brushfinch (Atlapetes pileatus) is a species of bird in the family Passerellidae, the New World sparrows. It is endemic to Mexico.

== Taxonomy and systematics ==
The rufous-capped brushfinch was formally described in 1831 with its present binomial Atlapetes pileatus. It is the type species for the genus Atlapetes. It has two subspecies, the nominate A. p. pileatus (Wagler, 1831) and A. p. dilutus (Ridgway, 1898).

== Description ==
The rufous-capped brushfinch is 14.5 to 16.5 cm (5.7 to 6.5 in) long and weighs 21.5 to 27.5 g (0.76 to 0.97 oz). The sexes have the same plumage. Adults of the nominate subspecies have a rufous crown, a dark charcoal face, and a gray nape. Their upperparts, wings, and tail are olive-green. Their throat is yellow. Their underparts are mostly yellowish with an olive tinge on the sides of the breast and a strong cinnamon tinge on the flanks and undertail coverts. They have a brown to dark red-brown iris, a blackish bill, and dusky pinkish to brownish legs and feet. Juveniles have no rufous on the crown, they have pale wing bars, and their underparts are paler than adults'. Subspecies A. p. dilutus is larger and overall paler than the nominate.

== Distribution and habitat ==
The rufous-capped brushfinch is found in the highlands of northern and central Mexico. Subspecies A. p. dilutus is the more northerly of the two and has two populations. One is found in the northwest in southwestern Chihuahua and Durango. The other is in the east from southeastern Coahuila and Nuevo León south through western Tamaulipas into San Luis Potosí. The nominate also has two populations. One is found from Sinaloa south to Michoacán and from there east to western Veracruz. The other is in the south in Guerrero, Oaxaca, and southern Puebla. The species primarily inhabits pine-oak forest and also the edges of montane evergreen forest and montane scrublands. Sources differ on its elevational range. A twentieth century publication places it between 1,225 and 3,400 m (4,000 and 11,200 ft). A 2006 field guide places it between 750 and 3,500 m (2,500 and 11,500 ft) and a 2020 source places it between 900 and 3,500 m (3,000 and 11,500 ft).

== Behavior ==
=== Movement ===
The rufous-capped brushfinch is a sedentary year-round resident.

=== Feeding ===
The rufous-capped brushfinch feeds on insects and seeds. It forages in pairs or family groups. It forages on the ground, where it turns over leaf litter, and not far above the ground in vegetation. It sometimes attends army ant swarms.

=== Breeding ===
The rufous-capped brushfinch breeds between April and August. Its nest is a cup made mostly from dry grass; one was in a dense shrub about 0.6 m (2 ft) above the ground. The clutch is two eggs. The incubation period, time to fledging, and details of parental care are not known.

=== Vocalization ===
The rufous-capped brushfinch's song is "1–2 thin notes followed by 4 chipping notes" that sometimes become a trill. Its call is "an excited chik or chi-chi-chi-chi".

== Status ==
The IUCN has assessed the rufous-capped brushfinch as being of Least Concern. It has a large range; its estimated population of at least 50,000 mature individuals is believed to be decreasing. No immediate threats have been identified. It is considered "common to fairly common in appropriate habitat".
