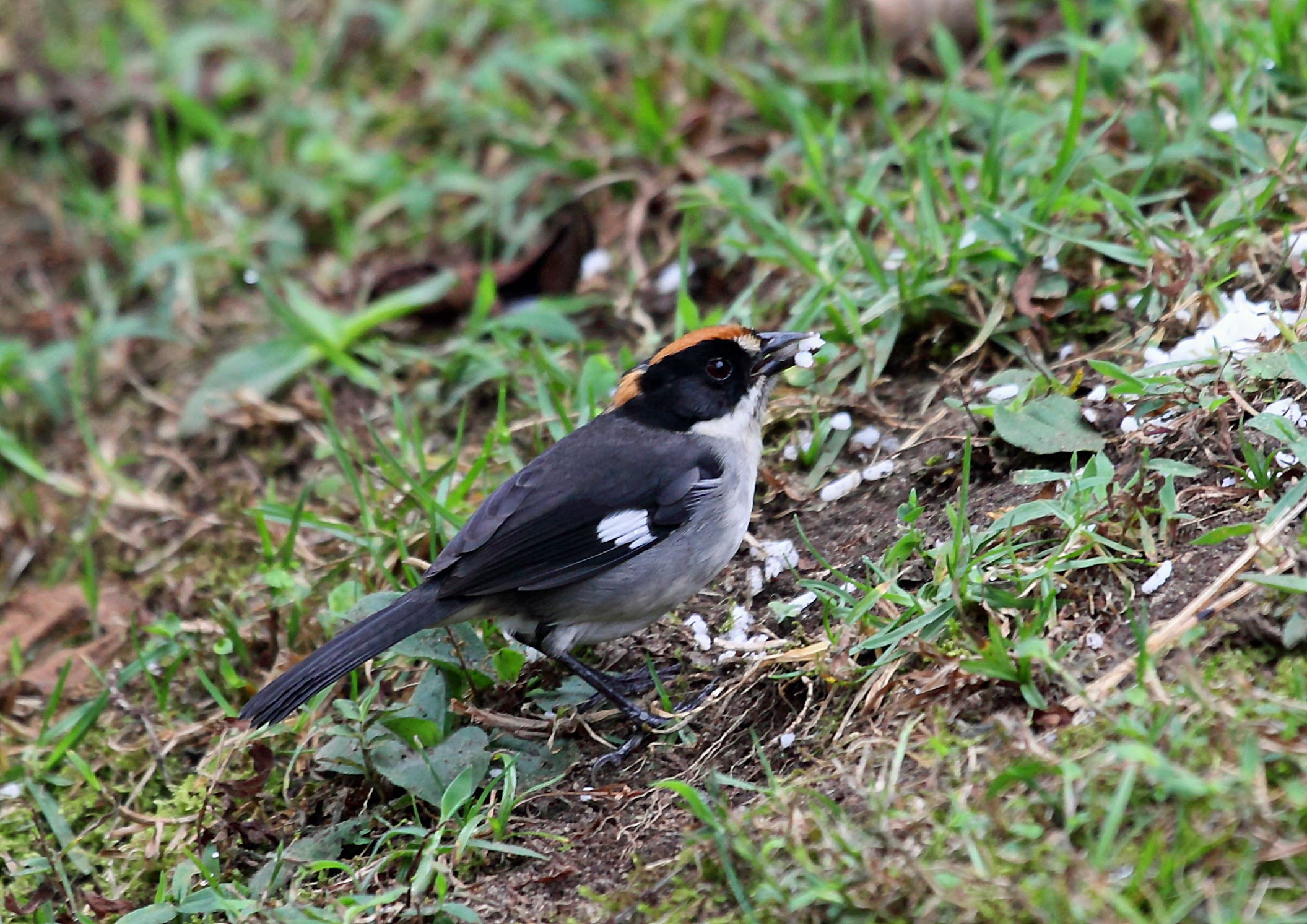
- White-winged brushfinch, A. l. leucopterus, Tandayapa, Ecuador
- Atlapetes leucopterus - White-winged brushfinch song

Conservation status
- Least Concern (IUCN 3.1)

- Least Concern (IUCN 3.1)

Scientific classification
- Kingdom: Animalia
- Phylum: Chordata
- Class: Aves
- Order: Passeriformes
- Family: Passerellidae
- Genus: Atlapetes
- Species: A. leucopterus

Binomial name
- Atlapetes leucopterus (Jardine, 1856)
- Range of A. l. leucopterus and A. l. dresseri (see Taxonomy and Distribution sections)

= White-winged brushfinch =

Species of bird

The white-winged brushfinch (Atlapetes leucopterus) is a species of bird in the family Passerellidae, the New World sparrows. It is found in Ecuador and Peru.

== Taxonomy ==
The white-winged brushfinch was formally described in 1856 with the binomial Arremon leucopterus. It later was reassigned to its current genus Atlapetes.

The IOC, the Clements taxonomy, AviList, and the independent South American Classification Committee assign the white-winged brushfinch these three subspecies:

- A. l. leucopterus (Jardine, 1856)
- A. l. dresseri (Taczanowski, 1883)
- A. l. paynteri Fitzpatrick, 1980

Subspecies A. l. paynteri had been formally described in its current subspecies position but in 2016 BirdLife International's Handbook of the Birds of the World (HBW) split it as the "cream-crowned brushfinch" (A. paynteri). Clements recognizes some distinction within the species, calling paynteri the "white-winged brushfinch (Paynter's)" and grouping the other two subspecies as the "white-winged brushfinch (white-winged)". AviList also recognizes some differences, and notes that "a comprehensive genetic analysis is lacking; further research needed".

This article follows the three-subspecies model.

== Description ==
The white-winged brushfinch is about 15.5 cm (6.1 in) long and weighs about 19 to 26 g (0.67 to 0.92 oz). The sexes have the same plumage. Adults of the nominate subspecies A. l. leucopterus have a russet stripe from the forecrown to the nape; it is darkest on the forecrown. Their face is mostly blackish with a buff-white spot above the lores and a wide white lower cheek with a thin black line below it. Their upperparts and tail are dark gray. Their wings are dark gray with white bases on the primaries and white on the marginal coverts. Their throat, breast, and belly are mostly whitish with some speckles at the edge of the throat and a buffy and grayish wash on the sides of the breast and the flanks. Juveniles have a buffy head stripe, olive upperparts, and dark streaks on the breast and flanks. Subspecies A. l. dresseri is similar to the nominate but with a black forehead and a variable amount of white on the face. Both subspecies have a dark brownish red iris, a blackish bill, and blackish brown legs and feet. Subspecies A. l. paynteri has a black forecrown and a creamy buff to white hindcrown and nape. Its face, upperparts, wings, and tail are like the nominate's. Its underparts are mostly pale grayish with a white lower belly and undertail coverts. It also has a significantly longer tail than the nominate. It has a reddish brown iris, a black bill, and dark gray legs and feet.

== Distribution and habitat ==
The white-winged brushfinch has a disjunct distribution. The nominate subspecies is found in the central valleys and on the western slope of the Andes of Ecuador between Imbabura and northern Azuay provinces. Subspecies A. l. dresseri is found in southwestern Ecuador's El Oro and Loja provinces and south into northern Peru's Tumbes and Piura departments. One or both of these subspecies might also occur in the gap between their two known ranges. A. l. paynteri is found on the eastern slope of the Andes from southern Zamora-Chinchipe Province in southeastern Ecuador into northern Peru to southern Cajamarca Department.

In much of Ecuador the white-winged brushfinch inhabits dry to arid woodlands and shrublands on interior hillsides and also plantations and gardens. A small proportion inhabits moister woodlands on the western Andean slope. In far southern Ecuador and in northwestern Peru it primarily inhabits the interior and edges of dry forest. In Ecuador it ranges in elevation mostly between 1,000 and 2,600 m (3,300 and 8,500 ft) and in northwestern Peru occurs between 400 and 2,000 m (1,300 and 6,600 ft). Subspecies A. l. paynteri inhabits the edges of humid montane forest at elevations between 1,700 and 2,200 m (5,600 and 7,200 ft).

== Behavior ==
=== Movement ===
The white-winged brushfinch is a year-round resident.

=== Feeding ===
The white-winged brushfinch's diet has not been studied but appears to be insects, seeds, berries, and other fruits. It forages on the ground, where it scratches in leaf litter, or slightly above it in vegetation. It typically forages in pairs or small family groups but sometimes after the breeding season gathers in flocks of up to about 30 individuals which may include other brushfinch species.

=== Breeding ===
The white-winged brushfinch's breeding season has not been defined but evidence suggests it spans from November to June with some regional variation within that span. Its nest and eggs have not been described and its incubation period, time to fledging, and details of parental care are not known.

=== Vocalization ===
The white-winged brushfinch's vocalizations vary among the subspecies. The song of A. l. dresseri is "a high, 2-part series of thin notes" and its call is "a high, descending tseeu". The song of A. l. paynteri is "a pleasant musical chew-chew tee-tee" and its call "a high ti". The species sings from a high perch and most often at dawn.

== Status ==
The IUCN follows HBW taxonomy and so has separately evaluated the "white-winged" (A. l. leucopterus plus A. l. dresseri) and "cream-crowned" (A. l. paynteri) brushfinches. Both are assessed as being of Least Concern. The "white-winged" group has a large range; its population size is not known and is believed to be decreasing. The "cream-colored" has a small range; its population size is also not known but is believed to be stable. No immediate threats to either have been identified. The species is considered fairly common to common in Ecuador; A. l. dresseri is fairly common in Peru and A. l. paynteri is "rare to locally fairly common" there.
