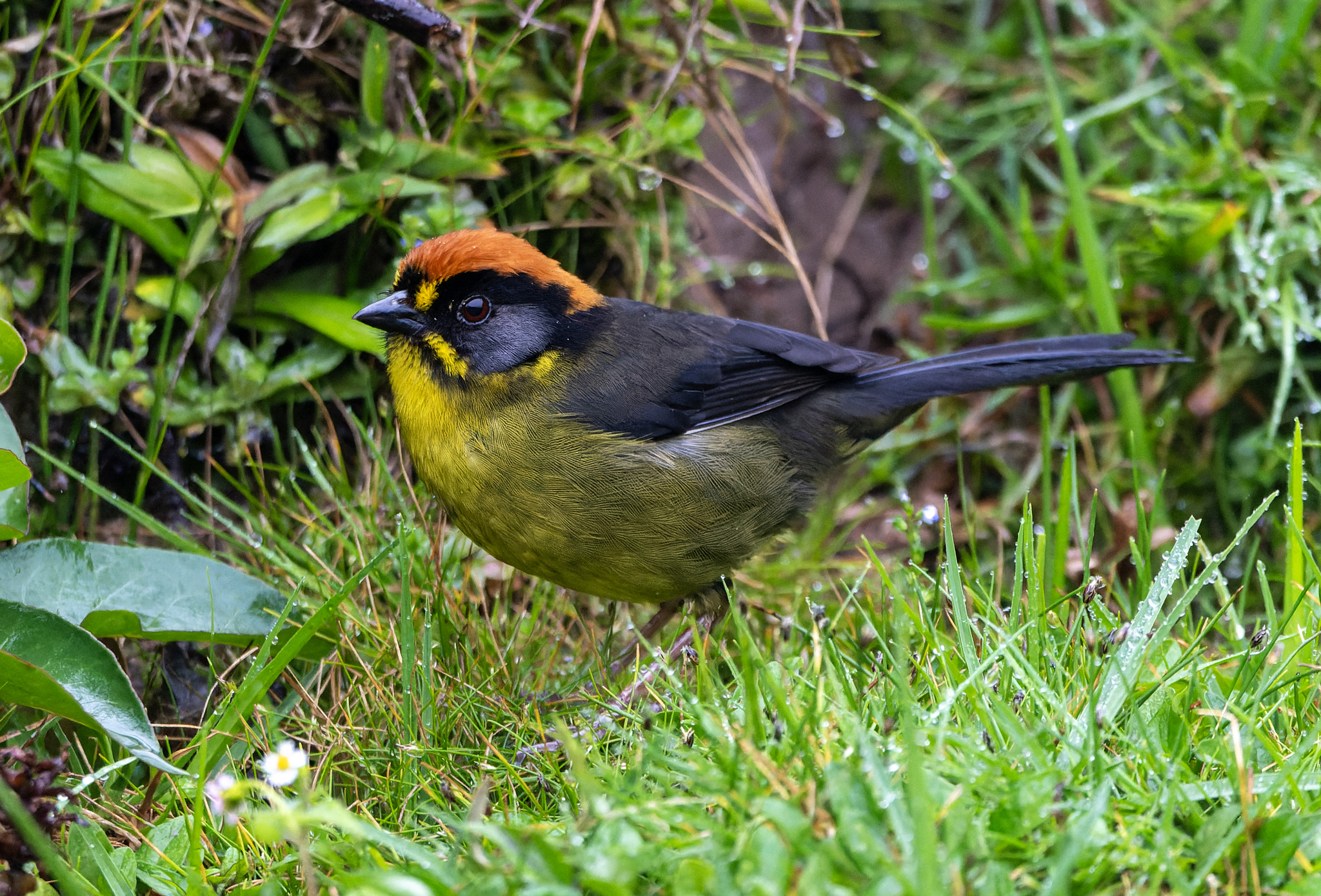

Conservation status
- Least Concern (IUCN 3.1)

Scientific classification
- Kingdom: Animalia
- Phylum: Chordata
- Class: Aves
- Order: Passeriformes
- Family: Passerellidae
- Genus: Atlapetes
- Species: A. rufinucha

Binomial name
- Atlapetes rufinucha (Lafresnaye & D'Orbigny, 1837)

= Bolivian brushfinch =

Species of bird

The Bolivian brushfinch (Atlapetes rufinucha) is a species of bird in the family Passerellidae, the New World sparrows. It is endemic to Bolivia.

== Taxonomy and systematics ==
The Bolivian brushfinch was formally described in 1837 with the binomial Embernagra rufi-nucha. By the end of the twentieth century it had been reassigned to its present genus Atlapetes and acquired the English name "rufus-naped brushfinch". By then had been assigned many subspecies but it was suspected that most of them deserved to be treated as full species. Early in the twenty-first century all but two of the subspecies were split as species. At that time A. rufinucha was renamed the Bolivian brushfinch to avoid confusion with the pre-split version.

The two subspecies of the Bolivian brushfinch are the nominate A. r. rufinucha (Lafresnaye & D'Orbigny, 1837) and A. r. carrikeri (Bond and Meyer de Schauensee, 1939).

== Description ==
The Bolivian brushfinch is about 17 cm (6.7 in) long and weighs about 21 to 22 g (0.74 to 0.78 oz). The sexes have the same plumage. Adults of the nominate subspecies have a blackish forehead and a rufous crown and nape. Their face is mostly blackish with a bright yellow spot above the lores and a yellow "moustache" with a blackish line below it. Their upperparts are blackish with a greenish wash on the rump. Their tail is blackish with olive feather edges. Their wings are blackish with olive edges on the flight feathers. Their throat is bright yellow; their underparts are yellow with a greenish wash on the sides and flanks. Juveniles have browner upperparts than adults with a brown wash and faint streaks on the underparts. Subspecies A. r. carrikeri is smaller than the nominate with no yellow spot above the lores and olive-greenish upperparts. Both subspecies have a dark reddish iris, a black bill, and blackish gray legs and feet.

== Distribution and habitat ==
The Bolivian brushfinch has a disjunct distribution in the Bolivian Andes. The nominate subspecies is the more northerly of the two and has three populations. It is found in two small areas in La Paz Department and a larger one in Cochabamba Department. Subspecies A. r. carrikeri is found in Santa Cruz Department. The species inhabits semi-open landscapes including the edges of montane and Yungas forest, shrubby pastures, and secondary forest. In elevation it ranges between 1,200 and 3,600 m (3,900 and 11,800 ft).

== Behavior ==
=== Movement ===
The Bolivian brushfinch is a year-round resident.

=== Feeding ===
The Bolivian brushfinch's diet has not been studied. It forages on the ground or slightly above it in vegetation and is usually in pairs or family groups.

=== Breeding ===
The Bolivian brushfinch's breeding season has not been defined but includes December to February. Nothing else is known about the species' breeding biology.

=== Vocalization ===
The Bolivian brushfinch has a simple song written as "weew Chéééw! or cheuu tch-weééé. The species' calls include a "high zziiip".

== Status ==
The IUCN has assessed the Bolivian brushfinch as being of Least Concern. It has a large range; its population size is not known and is believed to be decreasing. No immediate threats have been identified. It is considered fairly common to common and because "it prefers edge habitats, it may benefit from disturbance of montane forests".
