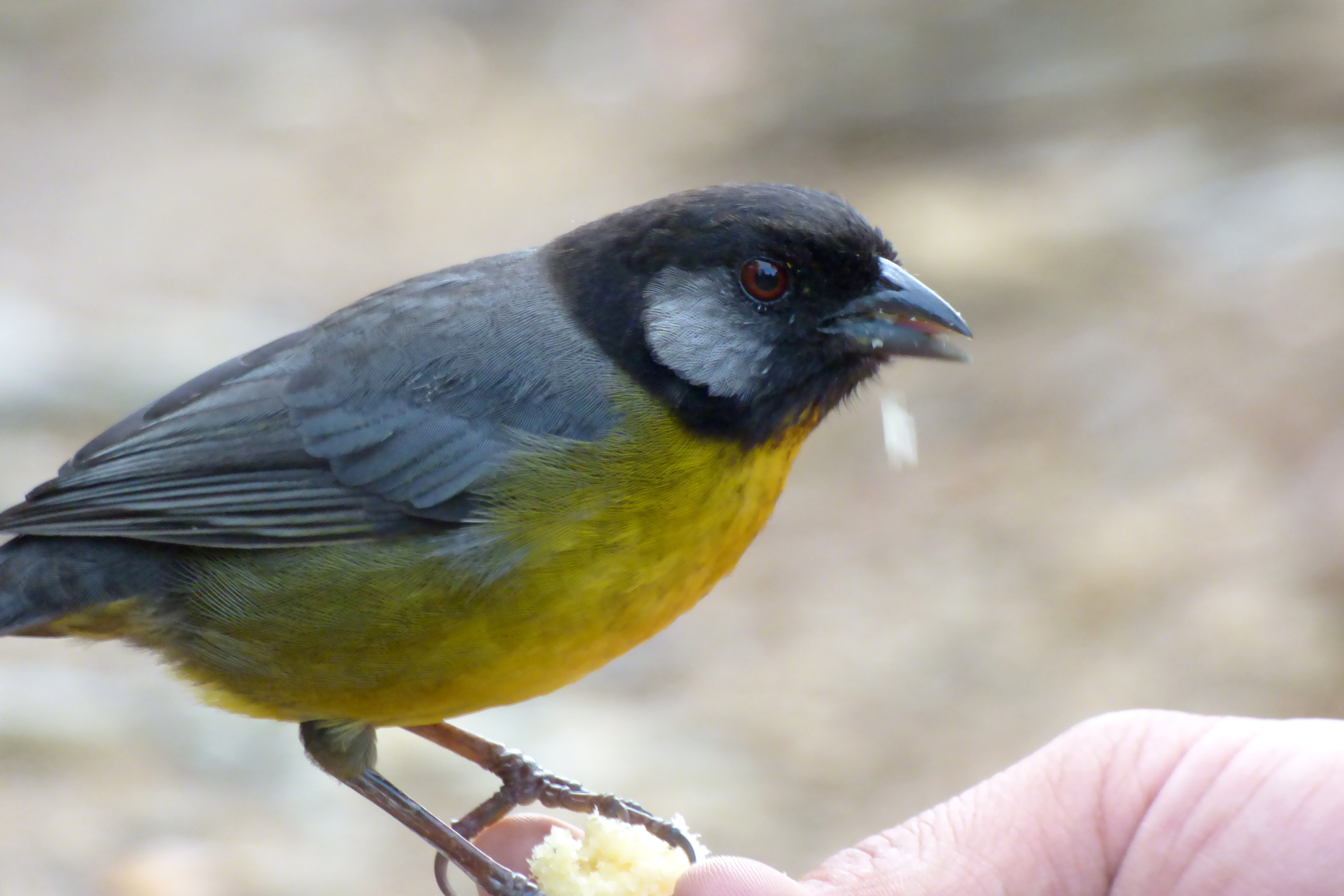

Conservation status
- Least Concern (IUCN 3.1)

Scientific classification
- Kingdom: Animalia
- Phylum: Chordata
- Class: Aves
- Order: Passeriformes
- Family: Passerellidae
- Genus: Atlapetes
- Species: A. melanocephalus

Binomial name
- Atlapetes melanocephalus (Salvin & Godman, 1880)

= Santa Marta brushfinch =

Species of bird

The Santa Marta brushfinch (Atlapetes melanocephalus) is a species of bird in the family Passerellidae, the New World sparrows. It is endemic to the Sierra Nevada de Santa Marta in northern Colombia.

== Taxonomy and systematics ==
The Santa Marta brushfinch was formally described in 1880 with the binomial Buarremon melanocephalus. It is monotypic.

== Description ==
The Santa Marta brushfinch is about 17 cm (6.7 in) long and weighs about 28 g (0.99 oz). The sexes have the same plumage. Adults have a mostly black head with a silvery gray patch on the ear coverts. Their upperparts are olive gray and their wings and tail are blackish with thin olive feather edges. Their throat and underparts are mostly lemon yellow with an olive wash on the flanks. They have a chestnut iris, a pale gray or black bill, and dusky pink legs and feet. Juveniles are duller and paler than adults. Their upperparts are more brownish and their underparts buffy yellow with thin dusky streaks.

== Distribution and habitat ==
The Santa Marta brushfinch is found only in the isolated Sierra Nevada de Santa Marta of far northern Colombia. It primarily inhabits humid montane forest both primary and secondary, where it favors the edges and apparently shuns the interior. It also occurs in brushy pastures, shade coffee plantations, and gardens. It mostly ranges in elevation between 1,500 and 3,200 m (4,900 and 10,500 ft). Its highest density is below 1,500 m (4,900 ft) and locally occurs as low as 600 m (2,000 ft).

== Behavior ==
=== Movement ===
The Santa Marta brushfinch is a year-round resident.

=== Feeding ===
The Santa Marta brushfinch's diet and foraging behavior have not been studied. It has been observed foraging in pairs or small groups on and near the ground and feeding on insects, seeds, and small fruits. Groups regularly lead mixed-species feeding flocks.

=== Breeding ===
The Santa Marta brushfinch's breeding season spans at least January to May. Its nest is a bulky cup made from long plant fibers of bark, grass, and bamboo leaves. It is usually well concealed in vegetation and located between about 0.8 and 2.5 m (3 and 8 ft) above the ground. The clutch is two eggs that are white densely blotched with brown. The incubation period, time to fledging, and details of parental care are not known.

=== Vocalization ===
The Santa Marta brushfinch sings two or three loud sweet notes. In duet pairs sing "a lot of buzzy notes, bzt-bzt-bzt, bzbzbzbzbzzbz, speeding up and becoming louder towards [the] end". Its calls are sharp tsip or chip notes.

== Status ==
The IUCN has assessed the Santa Marta brushfinch as being of Least Concern. It has a small range; its population size is not known but is believed to be stable. No immediate threats have been identified. It is considered common in its limited range. "To date, no human effects on Santa Marta Brushfinch have been reported. It has a very restricted distribution, however, and in the long term, it is vulnerable to habitat loss."
