= Stripe-headed brushfinch =

The stripe-headed brushfinch is split into the following species:

- White-browed brushfinch, Arremon torquatus
- Grey-browed brushfinch, Arremon assimilis
- Black-headed brushfinch, Arremon atricapillus
- Costa Rican brushfinch, Arremon costaricensis
- Perijá brushfinch, Arremon perijanus
- Sierra Nevada brushfinch, Arremon basilicus
- Caracas brushfinch, Arremon phaeopleurus
- Paria brushfinch, Arremon phygas
