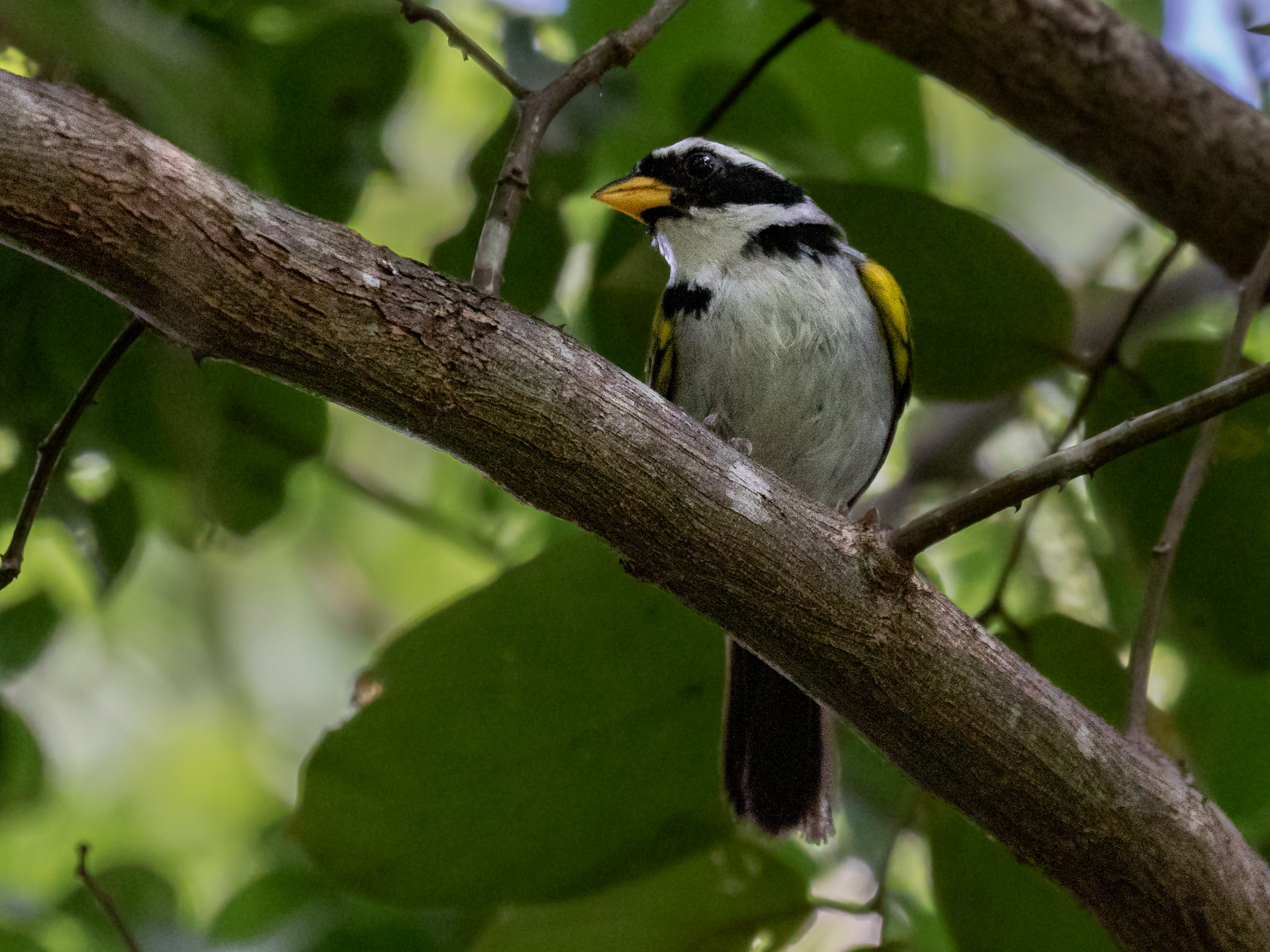

Conservation status
- Near Threatened (IUCN 3.1)

Scientific classification
- Kingdom: Animalia
- Phylum: Chordata
- Class: Aves
- Order: Passeriformes
- Family: Passerellidae
- Genus: Arremon
- Species: A. franciscanus

Binomial name
- Arremon franciscanus Raposo, 1997

= São Francisco sparrow =

Sao Francisco sparrow

Species of bird endemic to Brazil

The Sao Francisco sparrow (Note: The IOC and most other taxonomic systems spell the English name with no diacritics. The IOC is the Wikipedia standard for bird names.) (Arremon franciscanus) is a Near Threatened species of bird in the family Passerellidae, the New World sparrows. It is endemic to Brazil.

== Taxonomy and systematics ==
The Sao Francisco sparrow was formally described in 1997 by Marcos Raposo. He suggested that its closest relative is the half-collared sparrow (A. semitorquatus). It is monotypic.

== Description ==
The Sao Francisco sparrow is about 21 cm (8.3 in) long and weighs 21 to 25 g (0.74 to 0.88 oz). Females have not been formally described. Adult males have a black crown with a thin whitish or pale gray stripe through its middle, black lores, and a white supercilium that extends to the nape. The rest of their face is black. Their nape and the sides of their neck are pale gray. Their upperparts, wings, and tail are mostly greenish olive; some individuals are yellower on their lesser wing coverts. They have a thin black chin line just under their bill and a white throat. Their underparts are mostly white with an oval black spot on the side of the upper breast and light gray flanks. They have a brown to dark reddish brown iris, an orange-yellow bill with a blackish culmen, and pinkish gray to brownish gray legs and feet.

== Distribution and habitat ==
The Sao Francisco sparrow is found in east-central Brazil in southern Bahia and northern Minas Gerais states. Its range is centered on the São Francisco River valley. It primarily inhabits the caatinga, a biome characterized by dense deciduous shrubs. It is suspected to also occur in the somewhat taller vegetation between the caatinga and humid evergreen forest. In elevation it ranges between 600 and 1,400 m (2,000 and 4,600 ft).

== Behavior ==
=== Movement ===
The Sao Francisco sparrow is a year-round resident.

=== Feeding ===
The Sao Francisco sparrow's diet has not been studied; it is assumed to include insects, seeds, and fruits. It forages on the ground or near it in low vegetation.

=== Breeding ===
Nothing is known about the Sao Francisco sparrow's breeding biology.

=== Vocalization ===
Raposo described two Sao Francisco sparrow songs, both of which have three parts. One, which was uttered spontaneously, had "three equal introductory syllables...one or two isolated high frequency notes [and] a conclusive trill". The other, which came after he played a recording of the first song, was "two equal introductory phrases which have two different syllables [and] a decreasing (in intensity) series of five to six similar modulated whistles". He described its call as "a thin hissing". A later author rendered the first song as "twip-twip tsip-tsip-tsip-tsip" and the second as "tsip-tsup tsip-tsup chp-chp-chp-chp". He rendered the call as a metallic "sharp ringing tiip".

== Status ==
The IUCN has assessed the Sao Francisco sparrow as Near Threatened. It has a patchy distribution over a limited range. Its population size is not known and is believed to be decreasing. "The main threats to this species are the conversion of vast areas of caatinga and dry forests for agriculture, irrigation areas, and human settlements. Fire is an additional threat. Rates of habitat loss do not appear especially rapid at present, however suitable habitat may undergo a moderately rapid reduction in response to climate change and deforestation in the future." It is considered "uncommon to rare" across its range. Raposo stated that his work "draws attention to the destruction of the caatingas and tropical dry forests of the valley of the São Francisco River".
