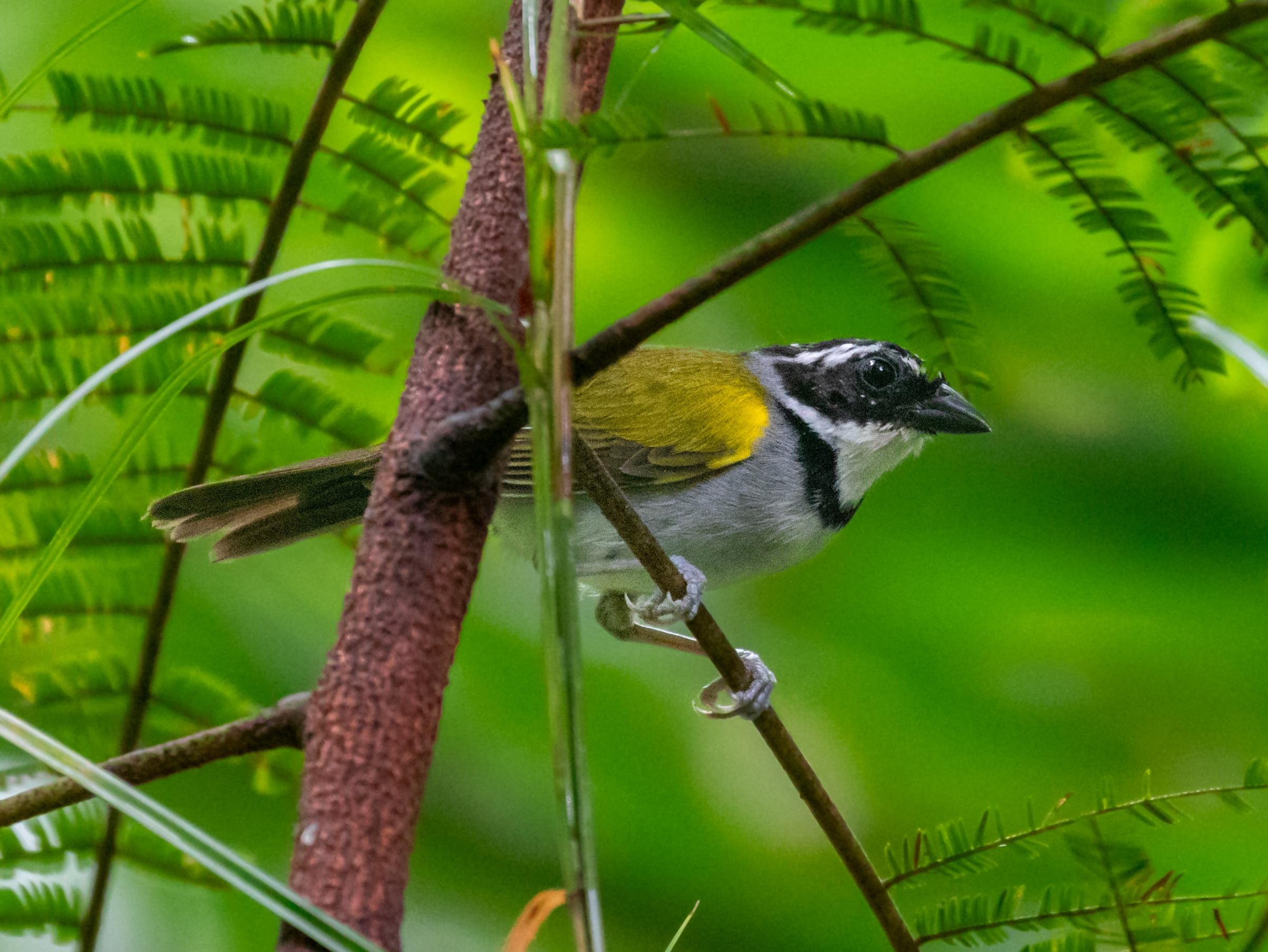
- Pectoral sparrow (Arremon taciturnus)

Scientific classification
- Kingdom: Animalia
- Phylum: Chordata
- Class: Aves
- Order: Passeriformes
- Family: Passerellidae
- Genus: Arremon; Vieillot, 1816

Type species
- Tanagra taciturna Hermann, 1783

= Arremon =

Genus of birds

Arremon is a genus of neotropical birds in the family Passerellidae. With the exception of the green-striped brushfinch which is endemic to Mexico, all species are found in South America, with a few reaching Central America.

These sparrows are found in lowland woodlands and forests where they usually forage on the ground. They have olive or grey upperparts with a black head. Many have a white line above the eye and some have a black band across the breast.

== Taxonomy ==
The genus Arremon was erected in 1816 by the French ornithologist Louis Pierre Vieillot in his Analyse d'une Nouvelle Ornithologie Élémentaire to accommodate the pectoral sparrow (Arremon taciturnus). The name is from the Ancient Greek arrhēmōn meaning "silent" or "without speech". The pectoral sparrow had been given the French name "L'Oiseau Silencieux" by the polymath Georges-Louis Leclerc, Comte de Buffon in 1779.

The genus contains the following 22 species.

Image	Scientific name	Common name	Distribution
	Arremon crassirostris	Sooty-faced finch	Costa Rica, Panama and far northwestern Colombia
	Arremon castaneiceps	Olive finch	Colombia, Ecuador and far northern Peru
	Arremon brunneinucha	Chestnut-capped brushfinch	central Mexico to southeastern Peru.
	Arremon virenticeps	Green-striped brushfinch	Mexico
	Arremon atricapillus	Black-headed brushfinch	Colombia and Panama
	Arremon costaricensis	Costa Rican brushfinch	Panama and Costa Rica
	Arremon basilicus	Sierra Nevada brushfinch	northern Colombia
	Arremon perijanus	Perija brushfinch	northeast Colombia and northwest Venezuela
	Arremon phaeopleurus	Caracas brushfinch	Venezuela
	Arremon phygas	Paria brushfinch	Venezuela
	Arremon assimilis	Grey-browed brushfinch	Venezuela, Colombia, Ecuador, and most of Peru.
	Arremon torquatus	White-browed brushfinch	Argentina, Bolivia, and southern Peru
	Arremon aurantiirostris	Orange-billed sparrow	Belize, Costa Rica, Guatemala, Honduras, Mexico, Nicaragua and Panama
	Arremon taciturnus	Pectoral sparrow	Bolivia, Brazil, Colombia, French Guiana, Guyana, Peru, Suriname, and Venezuela.
	Arremon axillaris	Yellow-mandibled sparrow	northeast Colombia and west Venezuela
	Arremon franciscanus	São Francisco sparrow	Rio São Francisco and in the states such as Bahia and Minas Gerais, Brazil
	Arremon semitorquatus	Half-collared sparrow	southeastern Brazil.
	Arremon dorbignii	Moss-backed sparrow	base of the Andes, from eastern Bolivia to northwest Argentina
	Arremon schlegeli	Golden-winged sparrow	Colombia and Venezuela.
	Arremon abeillei	Black-capped sparrow	southwesr Ecuador and northwest Peru
	Arremon nigriceps (split from A. abeillei)	Marañón sparrow	northern Peru
	Arremon flavirostris	Saffron-billed sparrow	Argentina, Bolivia, Brazil, and Paraguay

This genus includes species traditionally placed in Buarremon and Lysurus.
