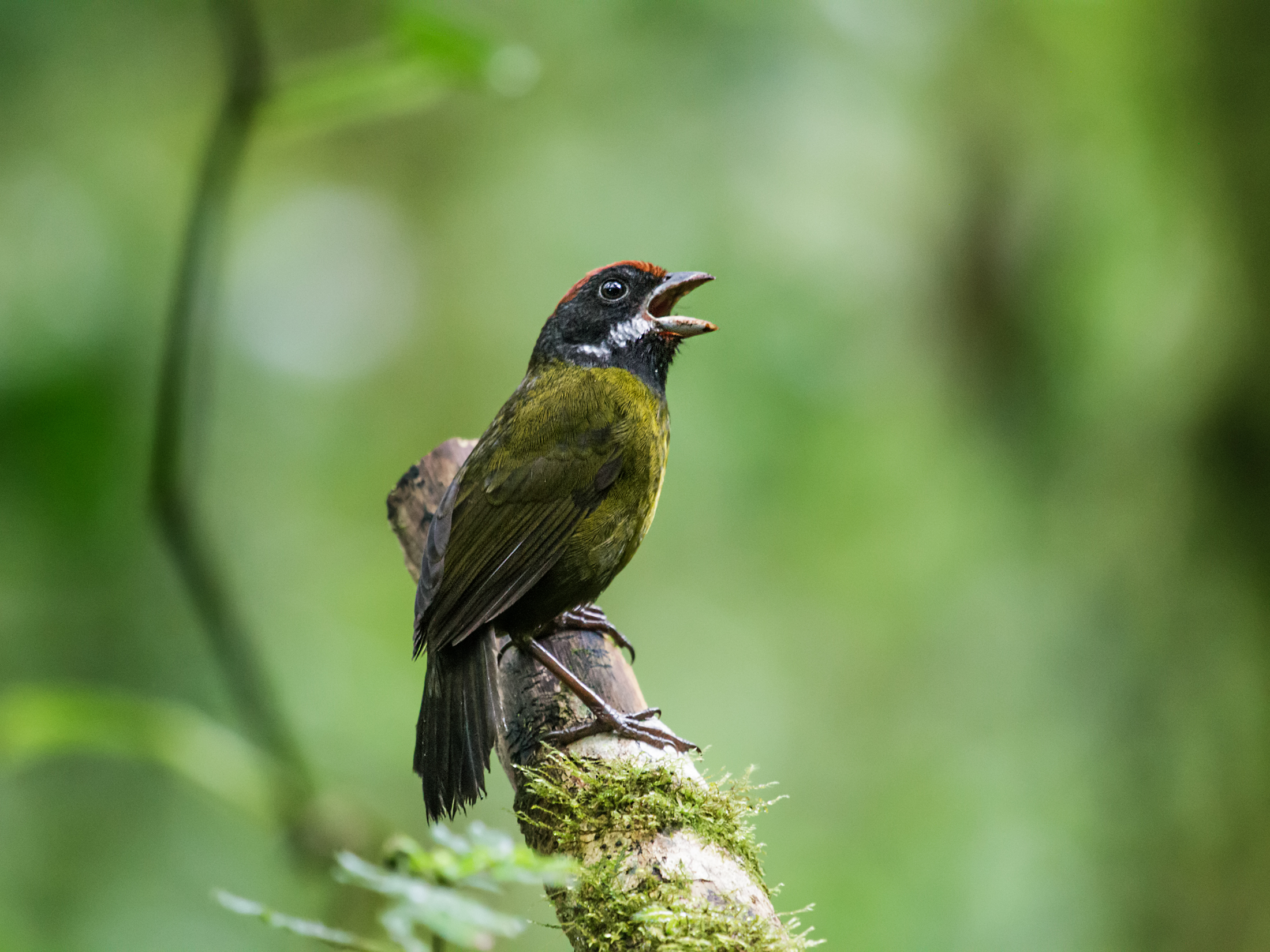

Conservation status
- Least Concern (IUCN 3.1)

Scientific classification
- Kingdom: Animalia
- Phylum: Chordata
- Class: Aves
- Order: Passeriformes
- Family: Passerellidae
- Genus: Arremon
- Species: A. crassirostris

Binomial name
- Arremon crassirostris (Cassin, 1865)

Synonyms
- See text

= Sooty-faced finch =

Species of bird

The sooty-faced finch (Arremon crassirostris) is a species of bird in the family Emberizidae, the New World sparrows. It is found in Colombia, Costa Rica, and Panama.

== Taxonomy and systematics ==
The sooty-faced finch has a complicated taxonomic history. It was formally described in 1865 with the binomial Buarremon crassirostris. In 1898 Robert Ridgway erected a new genus for it, Lysurus. He also assigned what is now the olive finch (then Buarremon castaneiceps, now Arremon castaneiceps) to the new genus. In 2008 taxonomists began merging Lysurus into Arremon. The sooty-faced and olive finches are now treated as sister species.

The sooty-faced finch is monotypic.

== Description ==
The sooty-faced finch is 15 to 17 cm (5.9 to 6.7 in) long and weighs 37 to 40.5 g (1.3 to 1.4 oz). The sexes have the same plumage. Adults have a rusty crown and a white down-sweeping "moustache" on an otherwise blackish gray head and nape. Their upperparts are dark olive-green and their wings and tail a slightly browner olive-green. Their upper breast, sides, and flanks are dark olive-green and their lower breast and belly yellow. They have a dark brown or chocolate-brown iris, a dark gray maxilla, a pale yellow or whitish mandible, and dark legs and feet. Juveniles are mostly rich olive-brown with a black-smudged dull yellow belly.

== Distribution and habitat ==
The sooty-faced finch is found primarily in Costa Rica and Panama. In them ranges from the Cordillera de Tilarán in Costa Rica's northern San José Province south along the Cordillera de Talamanca into Panama as far as Coclé Province. It also has a small population on Cerro Tacarcuna that straddles the Panama-Colombia border. It inhabits montane evergreen forest in the subtropical and lower temperate zones. There it favors dense undergrowth, especially in ravines and along streams. Sources differ on its elevation range. An older one states that it overall ranges between 600 and 2,000 m (2,000 and 6,600 ft) and a much more recent one says between 600 and 2,340 m (2,000 and 7,700 ft). In most of its Costa Rican range it is found between 600 and 1,500 m (2,000 and 4,900 ft) but on the Pacific slope of the northern Cordillera de Talamanca is found between 1,200 and 1,600 m (3,900 and 5,200 ft).

== Behavior ==
=== Movement ===
The sooty-faced finch is a year-round resident.

=== Feeding ===
The sooty-faced finch feeds on insects, spiders, and berries. It forages on or near the ground, flicking its wings and tail as it hops along. It sometimes attends army ant swarms.

=== Breeding ===
Only one sooty-faced finch nest is known; it was found in May 1993 in Costa Rica. It was a dome made from moss, fern leaves, and Selaginella spike-moss and lined with bamboo leaves and fern rootlets. It had a side entrance. It was attached to a fern stem about 1.5 m (5 ft) above the ground. It held two eggs that were ivory-colored with vinaceous-pinkish spots and speckles. The incubation period, time to fledging, and details of parental care are not known.

=== Vocalization ===
One sooty-faced finch song is a "high-pitched, thin, emphatic pseee-psééét". Another is a "high-pitched, thin whistled see see seeya sue sue sisi see". Its call is a "sharp, thin, whistled pu-pee".

== Status ==
The IUCN has assessed the sooty-faced finch as being of Least Concern. It has a restricted range; its estimated population of at least 50,000 mature individuals is believed to be decreasing. No immediate threats have been identified. It is considered "frequent to common" overall. It is fairly common in most of its Costa Rican range but rare on the Pacific slope of the northern Cordillera de Talamanca. It is "very local" on Cerro Tacarcuna.
