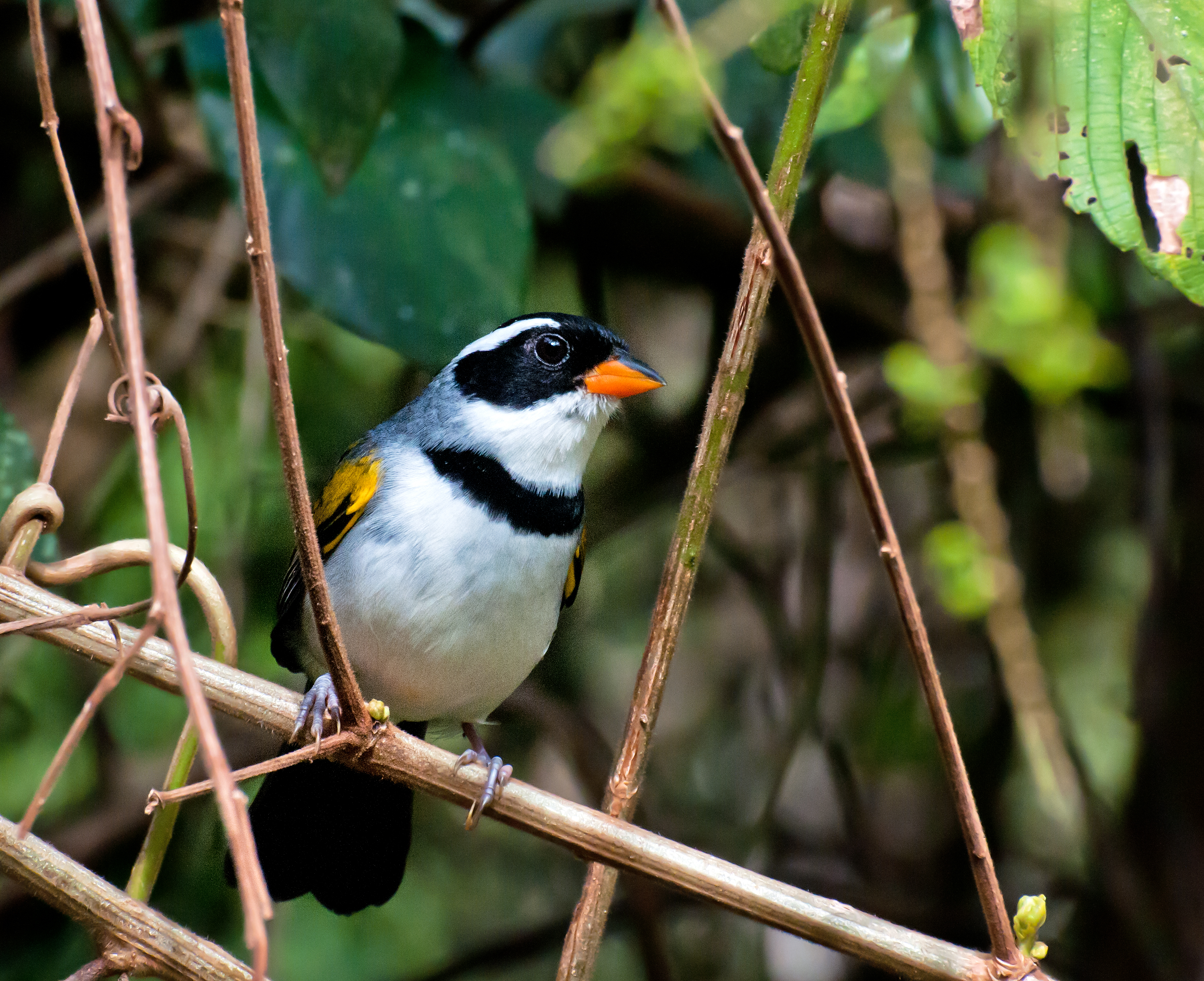
- In Piraju, São Paulo, Brazil

Conservation status
- Least Concern (IUCN 3.1)

Scientific classification
- Kingdom: Animalia
- Phylum: Chordata
- Class: Aves
- Order: Passeriformes
- Family: Passerellidae
- Genus: Arremon
- Species: A. flavirostris

Binomial name
- Arremon flavirostris Swainson, 1838

= Saffron-billed sparrow =

Species of bird

The saffron-billed sparrow (Arremon flavirostris) is a species of bird in the family Passerellidae, the New World sparrows. It is found in Argentina, Bolivia, Brazil, and Paraguay.

== Taxonomy and systematics ==
The saffron-billed sparrow has two subspecies, the nominate Arremon flavirostris flavirostris and the "gray-backed" A. f. polionotus. In January 2021, both the South American Classification Committee (SACC) of the American Ornithological Society (AOS) and the International Ornithological Congress (IOC) elevated the former subspecies A. f. dorbignii to species status as the moss-backed sparrow.

== Description ==
The saffron-billed sparrow's name comes from its "striking orange bill". The adult male's head is mostly black, with a white supercilium from above the eye to the back of the head. The neck is gray and the back, wings, and tail are green. Its underside is white with grayish edges and a narrow black band across the upper chest. The adult female is similar but duller overall. The female's underparts are buffy with brown flanks. Juveniles are similar to the adults but duller. The species' length is from 15 to 16.5 cm (5.9 to 6.5 in). The mean weights of 27 specimens from three populations were from 23.6 to 28.1 g (0.83 to 0.99 oz).

== Distribution and habitat ==
The nominate subspecies of saffron-billed sparrow is found in central and eastern Brazil. The "gray-backed" subspecies is found further south, in central and southern Brazil, eastern Bolivia, much of Paraguay, and northeastern Argentina.

The saffron-billed sparrow primarily inhabits tropical deciduous forest, both primary and second-growth. It is often found near forest edges, interior openings, and along waterways. In elevation it ranges from sea level to 1,400 m (4,600 ft).

== Behavior ==
=== Feeding ===
Though the saffron-billed sparrow's diet is not well known, it does include fruit, grain, and insects.

=== Vocalization ===
The song of the saffron-billed sparrow is a series of rapid notes variously described as "tsit, tsee-tsi-tsi, tseép-seép-tseép" and "sidsidlidsidlsidli". Its call is an insect-like "tseet". It vocalizes on or near the ground.

== Status ==
The IUCN has assessed the saffron-billed sparrow as of Least Concern. Though the species' population has not been determined, it is believed to the stable. It inhabits a very large range and appears to tolerate forest fragmentation.
