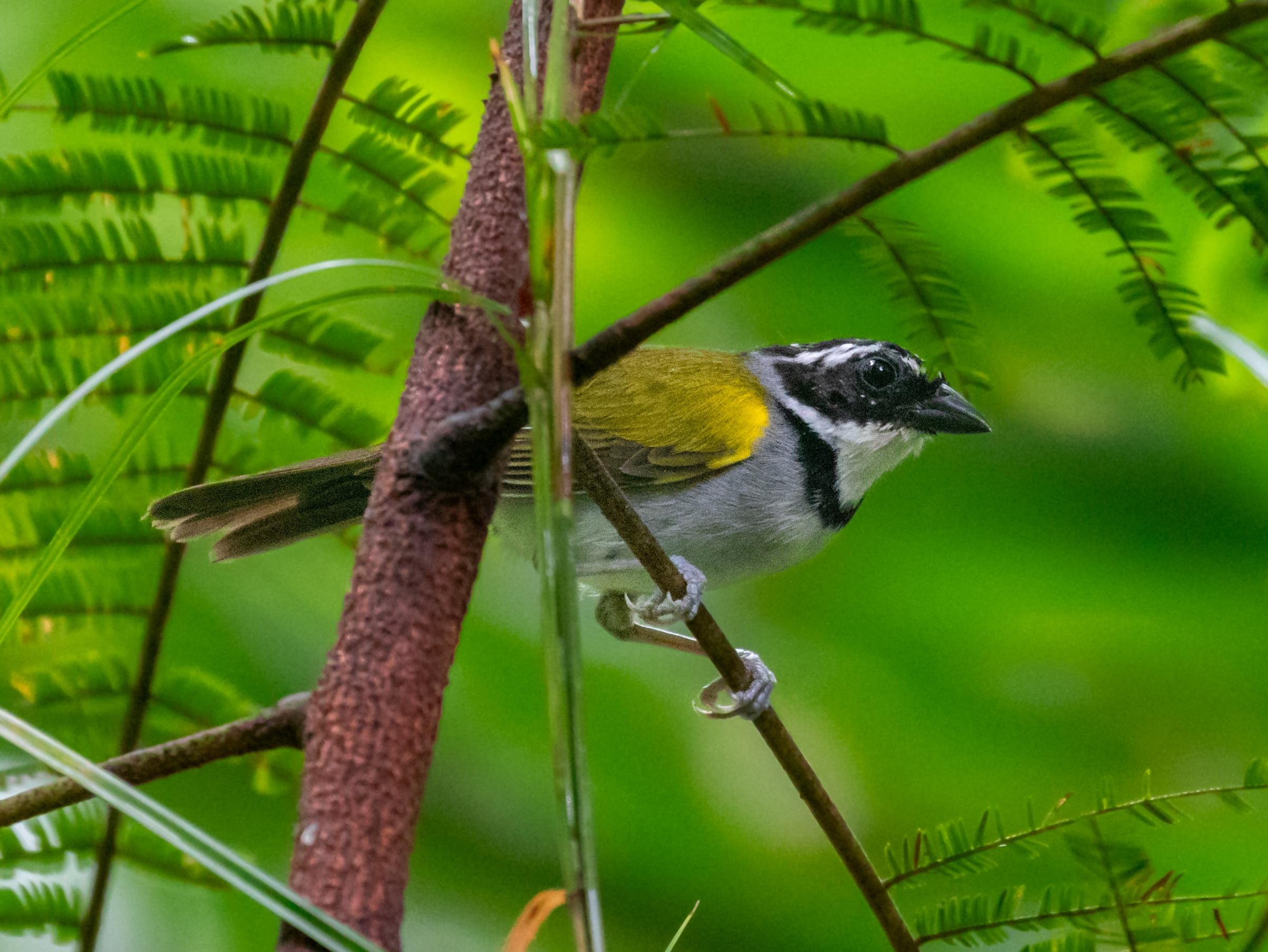
- Male pectoral sparrow in Rio Formoso, Pernambuco, Brazil

Conservation status
- Least Concern (IUCN 3.1)

Scientific classification
- Kingdom: Animalia
- Phylum: Chordata
- Class: Aves
- Order: Passeriformes
- Family: Passerellidae
- Genus: Arremon
- Species: A. taciturnus

Binomial name
- Arremon taciturnus (Hermann, 1783)

Subspecies
- A. t. taciturnus (Hermann, 1783); A. t. nigrirostris (Sclater, 1886)

Synonyms
- Tanagra taciturna (Hermann, 1783)

= Pectoral sparrow =

Species of bird

The pectoral sparrow (Arremon taciturnus) is a small species of New World sparrow first described in 1779 by Georges-Louis Leclerc. It has two subspecies. Like other sparrows in its family Arremon, it has pale green-to-olive wings, a distinctive black band going across its breast (in subspecies nigrirostris the band is not continuous and instead breaks in the center). It is found throughout southeastern South America, in subtropical or tropical moist lowland forests. The phenology of its breeding is unknown, however it has been observed nest building as early as August and as late as December. Incubation takes 15–17 days, however the duration of the nestling and fledgling stages are unknown due to a lack of research. It is omnivorous, mainly eating insects and seeds, and is considered a least-concern species by BirdLife International due to its large population and range.

== Taxonomy ==
The pectoral sparrow was described in 1779 by French polymath Georges-Louis Leclerc, Comte de Buffon in his Histoire Naturelle des Oiseaux under the French name L'Oiseau Silencieux, meaning "the silent bird". It was also illustrated in a hand-colored plate that was produced to accompany Buffon's book. Buffon did not use binomial names but in 1783 the French naturalist Johann Hermann coined the name Tanagra taciturna. The specific epithet taciturnus is the Latin word for "silent" or "quiet". The species is now placed in the genus Arremon, first described by the French ornithologist Louis Pierre Vieillot in 1816 with the pectoral sparrow as the type species.

Two subspecies are recognized:

- A. t. taciturnus (Hermann, 1783)—Found in east Colombia, central and south Venezuela, the Guianas, Amazonian Brazil and northeast Bolivia. Nominate subspecies.
- A. t. nigrirostris (Sclater, 1886)—Found in southeast Peru and north Bolivia. Unlike nominate, its breast band is not continuous and instead breaks in the center. Its name comes from Latin niger and rostris (derived from the word for bill, rostrum) meaning black-billed.

Mitochondrial DNA suggests that pectoral sparrow populations diverged in the late Pleistocene into six lineages across Amazonia. These lineages approximately correspond with the northern Amazon River watershed; Belém, Xingu, and cerrado region; the Tapajós-Xingu interfluve; Brazilian Atlantic forest; caatinga region; and southwest Amazonia.

The yellow-mandibled sparrow (Arremon axillaris) was formerly considered as a subspecies.

== Description ==
The pectoral sparrow is sexually dimorphic, and, as the name implies, sparrow-sized, at 15 cm (5.9 in) in length and 24 g (0.85 oz) in weight. Its upperparts are pale green, becoming yellow near the bend of the wing. The head is black, with white on its throat and as stripes on its crown. Its underparts are white in males and creamy in females, with males also having a broad black band going across its breast (a pectoral band). The beak is also black, roughly 14–15 mm (0.55–0.59 in) long for both males and females. Tails are 58–60 and 64–67 mm (2.3–2.4 and 2.5–2.6 in) and wings are 74–75 and 76–80 mm (2.9–3.0 and 3.0–3.1 in) for males and females respectively. Its iris is brown, and its tarsi and toes are pinkish gray.

Male and female plumage are different, with females having dull olive upperparts instead of bright yellow, are a grayish pectoral band.

The pectoral sparrow is fairly unique in its habitat, usually being the only small forest sparrow with a striped head in its range. It can be differentiated from the orange-billed sparrow, which it borders distribution with in eastern Columbia, by the namesake orange bill, as well its inverted throat colors (black throat with a white stripe).

== Distribution and habitat ==
The pectoral sparrow is non-migratory and can be found everywhere in the Amazon Basin east of the Andes except for the western parts between the Negro and Purus rivers. Besides the Amazon jungle, it is found in eastern and north-eastern Brazil. It occupies altitudes up to 1,500 m (4,900 ft) in southern Venezuela, 1,000 m (3,300 ft) in southeastern Peru, and 1,300 m (4,300 ft) in Bolivia. It occupies the lowland undergrowths of humid evergreen forests or secondary forests, and infrequently in lighter woodlands or coffee plantations, often when near humid wooded ravines. Pair density in Peru was reported to be about 1 pair per 200 hectares (490 acres).

== Behavior ==
=== Breeding ===
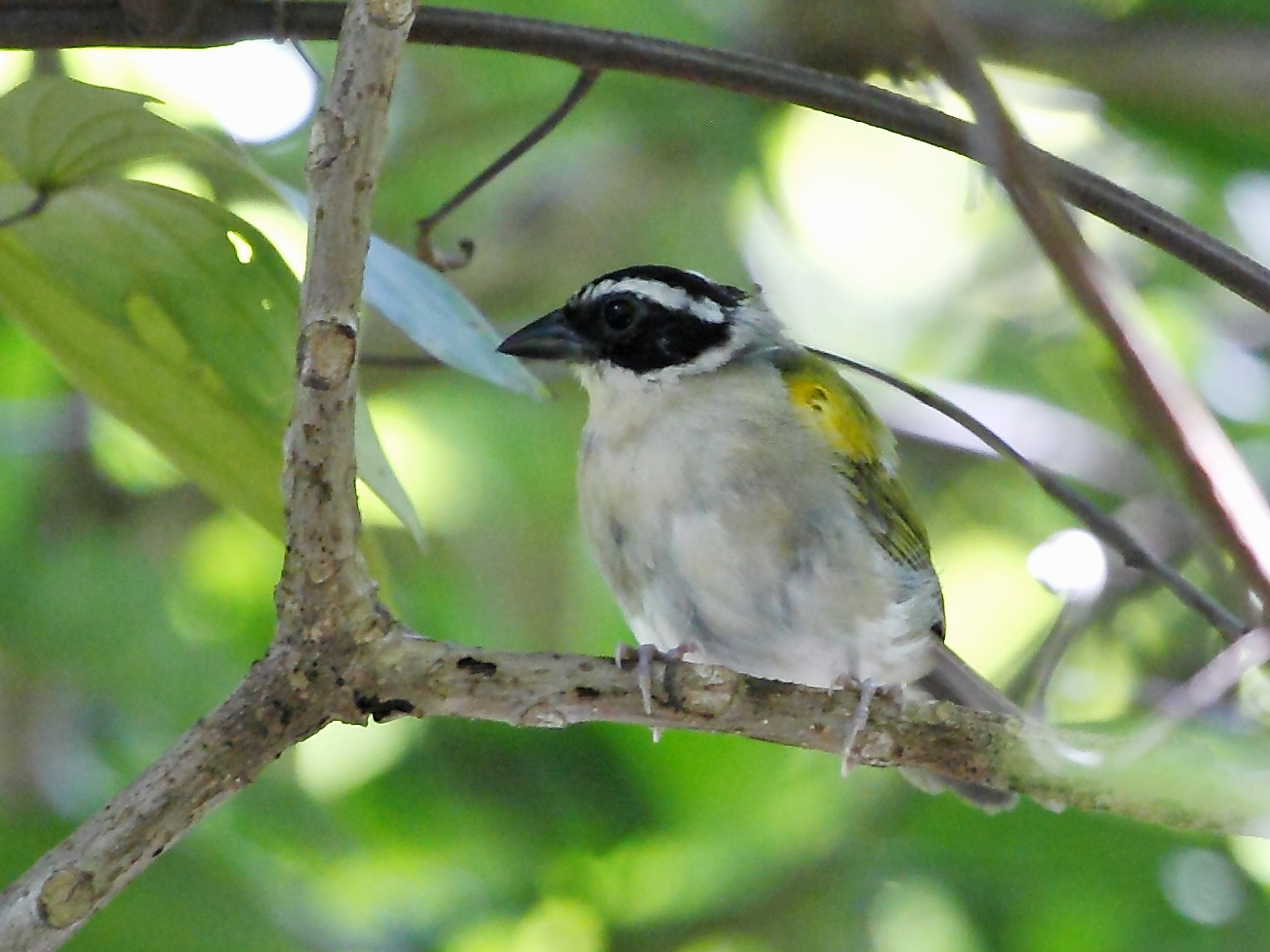
A juvenile pectoral sparrow sighted in Barbalha, Brazil

The pectoral sparrow is socially monogamous. Its nest is spherical, bulky, and roofed, with an entrance on the side, around 12.1 cm × 13.2 cm × 12.4 cm (4.8 in × 5.2 in × 4.9 in) in length, width and height respectively, and 48 g (1.7 oz) in weight. It consists of 2 layers — the outer layer, which is composed of dried bamboo, leaves, roots, and twigs, totaling around 35 ± 25 g (1.23 ± 0.88 oz) in weight, and the inner layer, which is much lighter, at 12.9 ± 3.2 g (0.46 ± 0.11 oz), and is composed of leaves (20%) and pale brown rootlets (80%). Eggs are on average 23.6 mm × 17.4 mm (0.93 in × 0.69 in) in length and width and weighing 3.5 g (0.12 oz). Nests have 2 eggs per clutch. Egg markings are highly variable; some completely white, others speckled with varying amounts of brown spots.

Incubation is an estimated 15–17 days, with the female acting as the sole incubator. Incubation is done in periods, averaging 71 minutes (ranging from 8 to 323 minutes). Females averages 7.4 trips outside the nests per day, each averaging 46 minutes, however trips increase in frequency as the eggs near hatching, going from 61% of daylight spent incubating during days 4–10 to only 55% during days 11-15.

Right after hatching, nestlings are blind and almost completely featherless, except for fine black down on their backs. Their beaks are yellow and their mouths have a bright red interior. At 3 days, nestlings are roughly 8 g (0.28 oz) and have small pin feathers on the wings. Nestlings gain mass at an average of 1.8 g (0.063 oz) per day. Fecal sacs are solely removed by males, who also do a majority of the feeding. However, all nests studied in Peru were depredated (attacked), and as such the length of the hatchling period and fledgling behavior is unknown.

The phenology of the pectoral sparrow is unknown, however a 2011 study by Valdez-Juarez et al. found recently laid eggs across the entire period of the study, from late August to early December. Additionally, out of the 15 nests studied, only 2 eventually hatched, the remaining having been abandoned or predated upon.

=== Feeding ===
Feeding behavior is not well studied. The pectoral sparrow has been observed foraging on the ground, mainly eating insects and seeds, and to a lesser extent various fruits. Studies on stomach contents in Brazil and Suriname showed various beetles, true bugs and ants, along with other insects and a small amount of grass and seeds. Adults have been observed bringing insect limbs to the nest for feeding.

=== Vocalizations ===
The song of the pectoral sparrow is a high-pitched buzz, consisting of very short tzik notes (initial tzik note may be slightly faster, and lower in pitch.) and usually followed by 2-4 longer, almost identical tzzzzzz notes. The entire song lasts for 2–3 seconds, at a pitch of 8 kilohertz. It may also sometimes use its tzik note as a call along with a rising seet, which ascends from 8-9 to 10-12 khz and lasts for 100ms. Calls are repeated a few times, however if the bird is excited, calls may be given very quickly or continuously.

== Conservation ==
According to BirdLife International, the pectoral sparrow is a least-concern species due to its large range of 9,910,000 km^{2} (3,830,000 sq mi) and large population size not meeting the criteria for vulnerable. The population size declined at an estimated rate of 5–9% over the 2016–2026 period.
