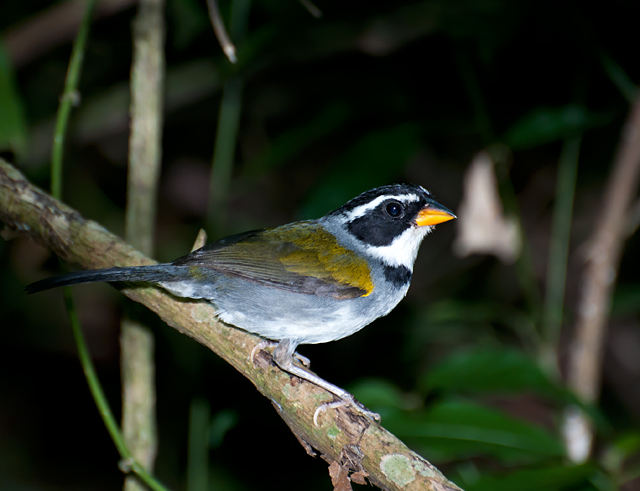
- In Piraju, São Paulo, Brazil

Conservation status
- Least Concern (IUCN 3.1)

Scientific classification
- Kingdom: Animalia
- Phylum: Chordata
- Class: Aves
- Order: Passeriformes
- Family: Passerellidae
- Genus: Arremon
- Species: A. semitorquatus

Binomial name
- Arremon semitorquatus Swainson, 1838

= Half-collared sparrow =

Species of bird endemic to Brazil

The half-collared sparrow (Arremon semitorquatus) is a species of bird in the family Passerellidae, the New World sparrows. It is endemic to Brazil.

== Taxonomy and systematics ==
The half-collared sparrow was formally described in 1838 with its current binomial Arremon semitorquatus. It was long treated as a subspecies of the pectoral sparrow (A. taciturnus) but was again elevated to full species status in the early 2000s. The two are sister species.

The half-collared sparrow is monotypic.

== Description ==
The half-collared sparrow is about 15 cm (5.9 in) long and weighs 22 to 28 g (0.78 to 0.99 oz). The species is sexually dimorphic but not dramatically so. Adult males have a black crown with a gray stripe through its middle, black lores, and a white supercilium that extends to the nape. The rest of their face is black. Their nape and the sides of their neck are gray. Their upperparts, wings, and tail are mostly greenish olive with somewhat more yellowish green on the lesser wing coverts. They have a white throat. Their underparts are mostly white with a black patch on the side of the upper breast and gray flanks. Adult females have a similar pattern to males. Female's upperparts are duller olive than male's and their throat and underparts are off-white to creamy white with a buff wash. Both sexes have a dark reddish brown iris, a black maxilla, an orange to orange-pink mandible, and grayish pink legs and feet. Juveniles have a mostly unpatterned dusky head, dark olive upperparts, and darker buffy yellow underparts than adults.

== Distribution and habitat ==
The half-collared sparrow is found in southeastern Brazil from Minas Gerais and Espírito Santo south to northeastern Rio Grande do Sul. It primarily inhabits the understory of humid montane forest and secondary forest and also occurs in shrubby fields and gardens. It reaches an elevation of 1,200 m (3,900 ft) but seldom occurs in the lowlands.

== Behavior ==
=== Movement ===
The half-collared sparrow is a year-round resident.

=== Feeding ===
The half-collared sparrow's diet has not been studied; it is assumed to include insects, seeds, and fruits. It forages on the ground, where it scratches in leaf litter, or near the ground in low vegetation. It usually forages singly but sometimes in pairs or small family groups.

=== Breeding ===
The half-collared sparrow apparently breeds between September and December. Its nest is a bulky ball of dry grass, twigs, and dry leaves and is typically placed on the ground or a little above it in a shrub. The clutch is two eggs that are whitish with brownish markings. The incubation period, time to fledging, and details of parental care are not known.

=== Vocalization ===
One song of the half-collared sparrow is "a high-pitched series of three whistles, each whistle descending in frequency, and each lower in pitch than previous one, tzee–tzeuuu-tzééúúúú". Another has "an up-down, up-down pattern, swee-swóóó swee-swóóó". Its call is a metallic "sharp ringing tiip".

== Status ==
The IUCN has assessed the half-collared sparrow as being of Least Concern. Is population size is not known and is believed to be decreasing. No immediate threats have been identified. It is considered "frequent to uncommon".
