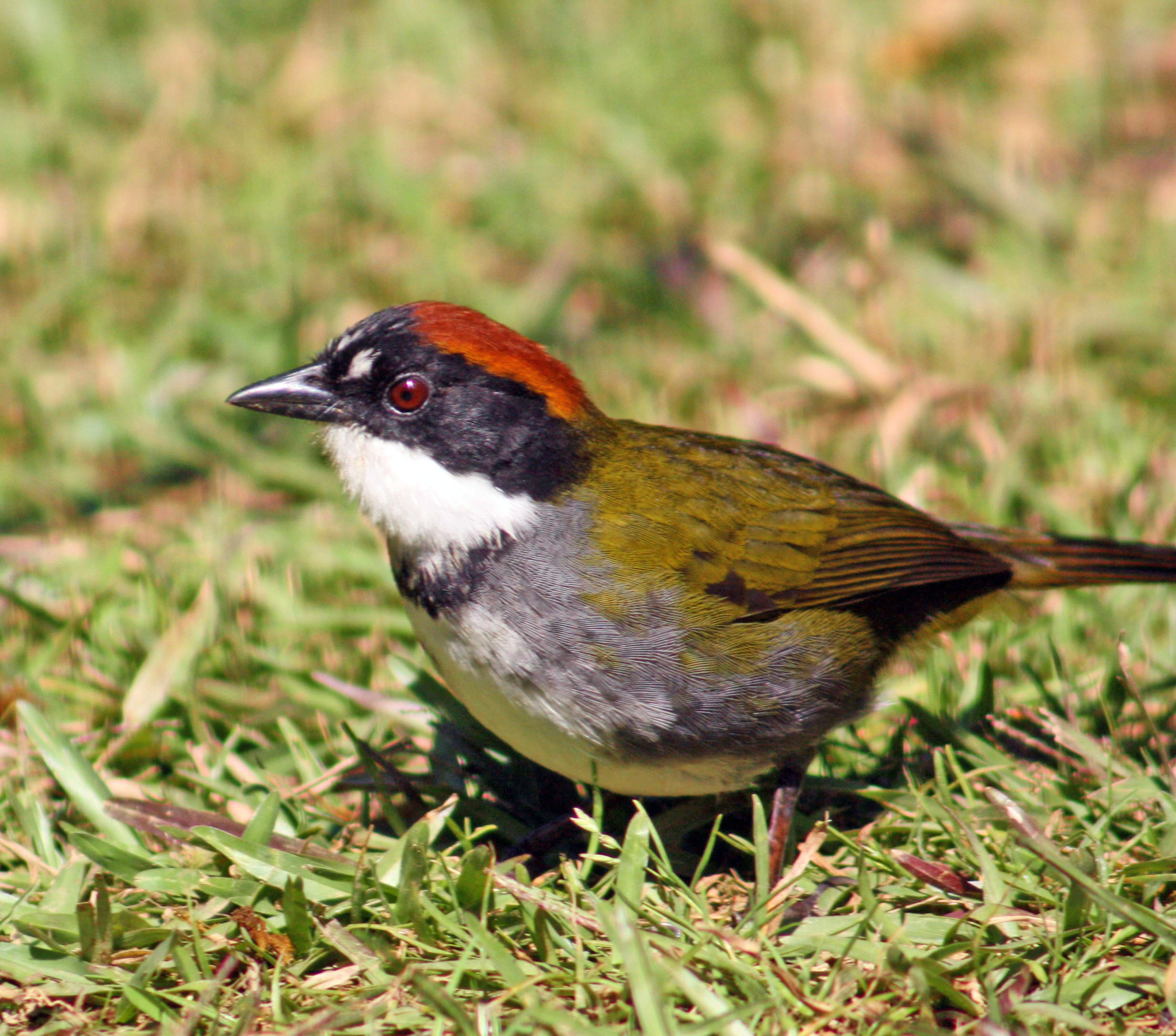

Conservation status
- Least Concern (IUCN 3.1)

Scientific classification
- Kingdom: Animalia
- Phylum: Chordata
- Class: Aves
- Order: Passeriformes
- Family: Passerellidae
- Genus: Arremon
- Species: A. brunneinucha

Binomial name
- Arremon brunneinucha (Lafresnaye, 1839)

Synonyms
- See text

= Chestnut-capped brushfinch =

Species of bird

The chestnut-capped brushfinch (Arremon brunneinucha) is a species of bird in the family Passerellidae, the New World sparrows. It is found from Mexico to Peru.

== Taxonomy and systematics ==
The chestnut-capped brushfinch was formally described in 1839 with the binomial Embernagra brunnei-nucha. It eventually was reassigned to genus Buarremon and the specific epithet revised to brunneinuchus. Genus Buarremon was still later merged into genus Atlapetes but further study resulted in Buarremon's being resurrected. In 2000 taxonomists again revised the specific epithet to its current brunneinucha. In 2008 taxonomists began merging Buarremon into Arremon.

The chestnut-capped brushfinch's further taxonomy is unsettled. The IOC, AviList, and BirdLife International's Handbook of the Birds of the World assign it these nine subspecies:

- A. b. apertus (Wetmore, 1942)
- A. b. brunneinucha (Lafresnaye, 1839)
- A. b. alleni (Parkes, 1954)
- A. b. suttoni (Parkes, 1954)
- A. b. macrourus (Parkes, 1954)
- A. b. elsae (Parkes, 1954)
- A. b. frontalis Tschudi, 1844
- A. b. allinornatus (Phelps, WH & Phelps, WH Jr, 1949)
- A. b. inornatus (Sclater, PL & Salvin, 1879)

However, as of late 2025 the Clements taxonomy assigns a tenth subspecies, A. b. nigralatera (Rowley, 1968), that the others include in A. b. suttoni. Clements also sets A. b. apertus apart within the species, calling it the "chestnut-capped brushfinch (plain-breasted)". Clements groups the others as the "chestnut-capped brushfinch (chestnut-capped)".

This article follows the nine-subspecies model.

== Description ==
The chestnut-capped brushfinch is 16 to 19.5 cm (6.3 to 7.7 in) long and weighs about 32 to 47 g (1.1 to 1.7 oz). It is one of the larger brushfinches. The sexes have the same plumage. Adults of the nominate subspecies A. b. brunneinucha have a wide black mask from their forehead and forecrown down to below the gape and back to the side of the neck. Within it they have a small white spot above the lores. Their crown and nape are chestnut with a thin yellowish tawny supercilium separating it from the top of the mask. Their upperparts are olive-green and their wings and tail a darker olive with yellow at the bend of the wing. Their throat is white with a thin black band below it across the upper breast. Their underparts below the band are grayish with a somewhat whiter belly. They have a dark brown to reddish brown iris, a black bill, and blackish brown legs and feet. Juveniles have a sooty brown crown, greenish brown to sooty brown upperparts, and a sooty olive throat and breast with heavy dusky streaks. Their maxilla is dull orange and their mandible yellowish with a dusky tip.

The other subspecies differ from the nominate and each other thus:

- A. b. apertus: little or no yellow supercilium, no black chest band, and mostly grayish underparts with white line down the center
- A. b. alleni: no yellow supercilium
- A. b. suttoni: bold yellow supercilium; chestnut of nape continues onto mantle
- A. b. macrourus: larger with whiter underparts
- A. b. elsae: less chestnut and more black on crown, little or no yellow supercilium, and sometimes olive-green tinge on flanks
- A. b. frontalis: three white spots above the lores and variable sized chest band
- A. b. allinornatus: no black chest band
- A. b. inornatus: no black chest band and whitish underparts with irregular black markings on breast sides

== Distribution and habitat ==
The chestnut-capped brushfinch has a highly disjunct distribution. Most subspecies' ranges are separate from the others and that of A. b. frontalis has gaps within it. The subspecies are found thus:

- A. b. apertus: Sierra de los Tuxtlas in southern Mexico's Veracruz state
- A. b. brunneinucha: eastern Mexico from San Luis Potosi and Veracruz south into northeastern Oaxaca
- A. b. alleni: northern El Salvador and across central Honduras into western Nicaragua
- A. b. suttoni: southern Mexico from Guerrero east to central Oaxaca
- A. b. macrourus: from extreme southeastern Oaxaca and Chiapas in Mexico across most of southern Guatemala
- A. b. elsae: through the mountains of Costa Rica and Panama to about the Canal Zone
- A. b. frontalis: extreme eastern Panama south through all three ranges of the Colombian Andes, through Ecuador on the western Andean slope to southern Chimborazo Province and on the eastern slope through Ecuador and the length of Peru; in the Serranía del Perijá straddling the Colombia-Venezuela border; in Venezuela the Andes from southern Táchira northeast to southern Lara, mountains of Yaracuy, and the Coast range from Carabobo to Miranda
- A. b. allinornatus: northwestern Venezuela's Sierra de San Luis in Falcón
- A. b. inornatus: western slope of Ecuador's Andes from southwestern Chimborazo Province south to Azuay Province

The chestnut-capped brushfinch inhabits the understory of a variety of humid to wet forest types in the upper tropical and lower temperate zones. In northern Central America these include pine-oak forest and cloudforest at elevations between 1,300 and 3,100 m (4,300 and 10,200 ft). In Costa Rica in addition to wet subtropical forest it occurs in mature secondary forest; in elevation it ranges there between 900 and 2,500 m (3,000 and 8,200 ft). In Panama it mostly occurs above 900 m (3,000 ft). In Venezuela it ranges between 1,000 and 3,100 m (3,300 and 10,200 ft) in the Andes and between 1,000 and 2,100 m (3,300 and 6,900 ft) in the Coastal Range. In Colombia it favors forest with a bamboo understory; it ranges in elevation between 800 and 1,600 m (2,600 and 5,200 ft). In Ecuador it mostly occurs between 700 and 2,500 m (2,300 and 8,200 ft) and in Peru between 1,300 and 2,200 m (4,300 and 7,200 ft) and locally to 3,100 m (10,200 ft).

== Behavior ==
=== Movement ===
The chestnut-capped brushfinch is a year-round resident.

=== Feeding ===
The chestnut-capped brushfinch feeds primarily on insects and seeds and smaller amounts of small fruits. It usually is seen singly or in pairs. It forages on the ground, where it turns over leaf litter with its beak, or near the ground in low vegetation. While foraging it often raises its crown feathers and fluffs those of it throat. It sometimes attends army ant swarms and seldom joins mixed-species feeding flocks.

=== Breeding ===
The chestnut-capped brushfinch's breeding season varies geographically. In Mexico overall it spans at least April to August, in Guatemala it includes July, in Costa Rica it spans April to August, in Panama it includes March, and spans March to August in Colombia. Its nest is a bulky open cup made from twigs and dry leaves lined with finer fibers including horsehair. It is typically placed in a shrub or small tree within about 2 m (7 ft) of the ground. The clutch is usually two plain white eggs. The female alone incubates, for about 14 days. Fledging occurs about 13 days after hatch.

=== Vocalization ===
One description of the chestnut-capped brushfinch's song is "a jumble of high-pitched, slurred whistles and staccato notes, peetee-zeer, peetee-súueet". Another is "a fairly slow, high-pitched series of sharp whistles: tseeee-tseeu-pseee-tzzzeeee". A third is "a high, sibilant series of thin whistles...for example: see-swee-sew-see-swee-SEER". Its calls include "a weak, high-pitched pink, seet or chink" and in alarm "sharp, rapidly uttered notes".

== Status ==
The IUCN has assessed the chestnut-capped brushfinch as being of Least Concern. It has a very large range; its estimated population of at least 500,000 mature individuals is believed to be decreasing. No immediate threats have been identified. It is considered overall "common to frequent" in Mexico and Central America, common in northern Central America and Costa Rica, locally common in Colombia, fairly common in Venezuela, "widespread" in Ecuador, and "fairly common and widespread" in Peru.
