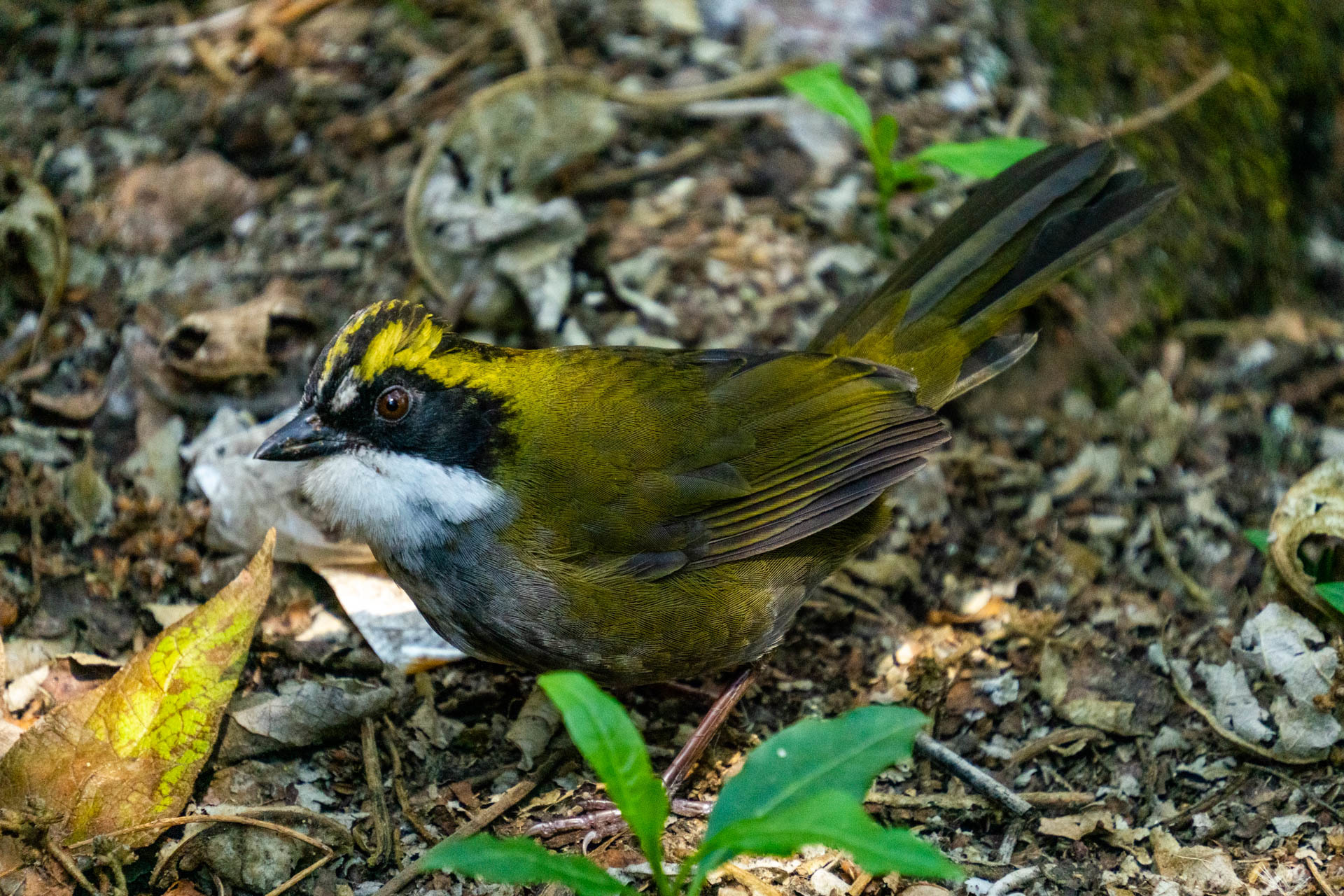

Conservation status
- Least Concern (IUCN 3.1)

Scientific classification
- Kingdom: Animalia
- Phylum: Chordata
- Class: Aves
- Order: Passeriformes
- Family: Passerellidae
- Genus: Arremon
- Species: A. virenticeps

Binomial name
- Arremon virenticeps (Bonaparte, 1855)

Synonyms
- See text

= Green-striped brushfinch =

Species of bird endemic to Mexico

The green-striped brushfinch (Arremon virenticeps) is a species of bird in the family Passerellidae, the New World sparrows. It is endemic to Mexico.

== Taxonomy and systematics ==
The green-striped brushfinch has a complicated taxonomic history. It was formally described in 1855 with the binomial Buarremon virenticeps. The genus Buarremon was later merged into genus Atlapetes but further study resulted in Buarremon's being resurrected. Buarremon virenticeps was for a time assigned as one of many subspecies of what was then the "stripe-headed brushfinch" (Buarremon torquatus) but was soon restored to full species status. In 2008 taxonomists began merging Buarremon into Arremon.

The green-striped brushfinch's further taxonomy is unsettled. The IOC, AviList, and BirdLife International's Handbook of the Birds of the World treat it as monotypic. However, as of late 2025 the Clements taxonomy assigns it two subspecies, the nominate A. v. virenticeps (Bonaparte, 1855) and A. v. verecundus (Moore, 1938).

This article follows the monotypic species model.

== Description ==
The green-striped brushfinch is about 17 to 19 cm (6.7 to 7.5 in) long and weighs 31 to 39 g (1.1 to 1.4 oz). The sexes have the same plumage. Adults have a black crown with a wide yellowish olive-green stripe in the middle. They have a white spot above the lores and a wide olive-yellow supercilium on an otherwise black face. Their upperparts, wings, and tail are olive-green with yellow at the bend of the wing. Their throat and upper breast are white, their flanks olive-green, and the rest of their underparts grayish. They have a light brown to red-brown iris, a black bill, and pinkish gray to dark brown legs and feet. Juveniles have a blackish brown head and paler stripes on it than adults. Their upperparts are brownish olive. Their throat and underparts are olive-brown with white mottling on the throat and buffy yellow streaks on the belly.

== Distribution and habitat ==
The green-striped brushfinch has a disjunct distribution in western Mexico. One population is in southern Sinaloa, northern Nayarit, and southern Durango. The other is found from Jalisco and Colima to Morelos and western Puebla. It inhabits semi-humid to humid montane evergreen forest, pine-oak forest, and fir forest in the subtropical and temperate zones. Sources differ on its elevation range. One states it is 1,500 to 3,000 m (4,900 to 9,800 ft). A more recent one states it is 1,750 to 3,500 m (5,700 to 11,500 ft) and a very recent one almost agrees, stating it is 1,800 to 3,500 m (5,900 to 11,500 ft).

== Behavior ==
=== Movement ===
The green-striped brushfinch is a year-round resident.

=== Feeding ===
The green-striped brushfinch's diet has not been studied but is assumed to be insects and seeds. It forages on or near the ground in dense vegetation and usually singly or in pairs.

=== Breeding ===
The green-striped brushfinch's breeding season has not been defined but spans at least April to July. The species apparently sometimes raises two broods in a season. Several nests were deep cups made from grass, dry leaves, and pine needles lined with fine rootlets and cattle hair. They were in dense shrubs between 1 and 1.5 m (3 and 5 ft) above the ground. One held two plain bluish white eggs that apparently were incubated solely by the female. The incubation period, time to fledging, and other details of parental care are not known.

=== Vocalization ===
The green-striped brushfinch's song is "a variable, often prolonged series of high, thin notes with slightly jerky, irregular rhythm ... ssi-ssi ssi ssi-ssi, ssi ssi-ssi ssi ssi-ssi ssi-ssi ssi-ssi-ssi, etc." and its call "a high, thin, sharp, ssii".

== Status ==
The IUCN has assessed the green-striped brushfinch as being of Least Concern. It has a large range; its estimated population of least 20,000 mature individuals is believed to be declining. No immediate threats have been identified. The species is considered fairly common to common.
