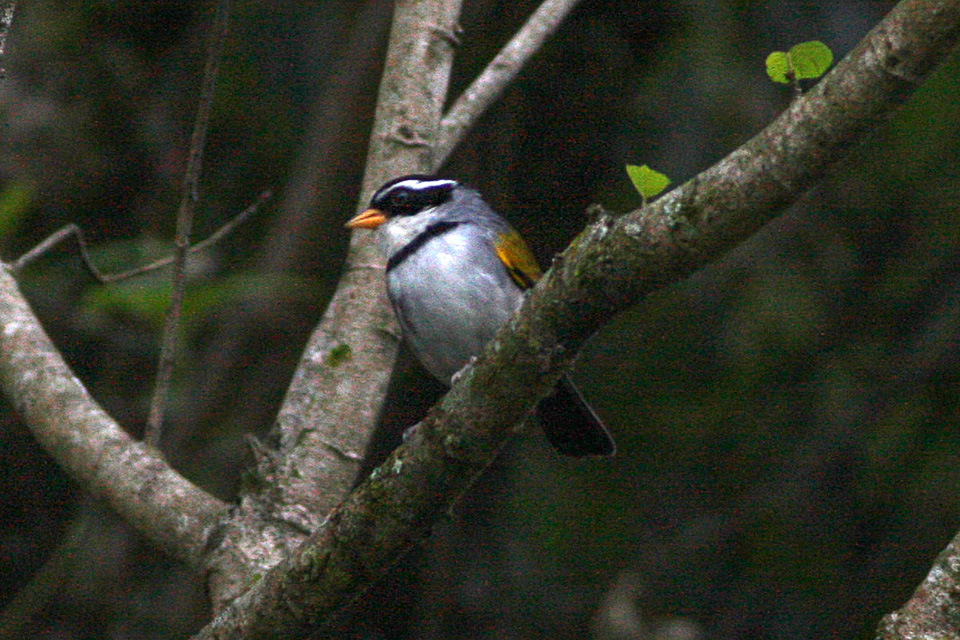

Conservation status
- Least Concern (IUCN 3.1)

Scientific classification
- Kingdom: Animalia
- Phylum: Chordata
- Class: Aves
- Order: Passeriformes
- Family: Passerellidae
- Genus: Arremon
- Species: A. dorbignii

Binomial name
- Arremon dorbignii Sclater, PL, 1856

Synonyms
- Arremon flavirostris dorbignii Sclater, 1856

= Moss-backed sparrow =

Species of bird

The moss-backed sparrow (Arremon dorbignii), also known as the stripe-crowned sparrow, is a species of bird in the family Passerellidae, the New World sparrows. It is found in South America from central Bolivia to northwestern Argentina.

== Description ==
The adult male moss-backed sparrow's head is mostly black, with a white supercilium from the lores to the back of the head and a narrow gray streak on the crown. The neck is gray and the back, wings, and tail are dull olive green. Its underside is white with grayish edges and a narrow black band across the upper chest. The adult female is similar but duller overall. The crown strip is olive and the underparts are buffy with brown flanks. Juveniles are similar to the adults but duller. The moss-backed sparrow shares the "striking orange bill" of its former "parent" saffron-billed sparrow. Six specimens from Argentina had a mean weight of 22.1 g (0.78 oz)

It differs from the saffron-billed sparrow by a slightly narrower collar and a longer eyebrow spanning on both sides of the eye.

== Distribution and habitat ==
The moss-backed sparrow is found in Bolivia from La Paz, Cochabamba, and Santa Cruz Departments into northwest Argentina as far south as Catamarca Province.

The moss-backed sparrow primarily inhabits tropical deciduous forest, both primary and second-growth. It is also often found near forest edges, interior openings, and along waterways. In elevation it ranges from sea level to 1,400 m (4,600 ft).

== Behavior ==
=== Feeding ===
Though the moss-backed sparrow's diet is not well known, it does include fruit, grain, and insects.

=== Breeding ===
The moss-backed sparrow nests from October into December. Its nest is enclosed and is built up to 1 m (3.3 ft) above ground. The mean clutch size is 2.8 eggs and the female does all the incubation. Both sexes feed nestilings.

== Status ==
The IUCN has assessed the moss-backed sparrow as of Least Concern. Though its population has not been determined, it appears to be stable with no known substantial threats. The species is described as "fairly common".

== Taxonomy and systematics ==
The moss-backed sparrow was formerly considered a subspecies of saffron-billed sparrow (Arremon flavirostris). In January 2021, both the South American Classification Committee (SACC) of the American Ornithological Society (AOS) and the International Ornithological Congress (IOC) elevated it to species status.
