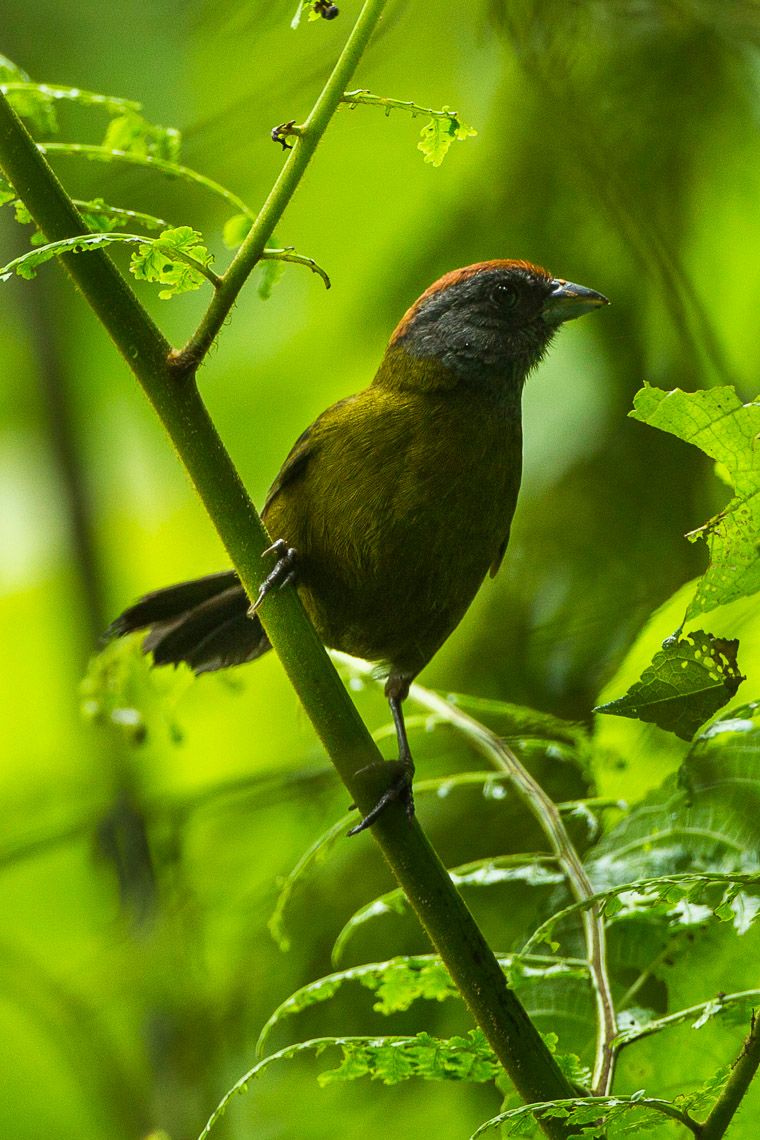
- Immature

Conservation status
- Near Threatened (IUCN 3.1)

Scientific classification
- Kingdom: Animalia
- Phylum: Chordata
- Class: Aves
- Order: Passeriformes
- Family: Passerellidae
- Genus: Arremon
- Species: A. castaneiceps

Binomial name
- Arremon castaneiceps (Sclater, PL, 1860)

Synonyms
- Lysurus castaneiceps

= Olive finch =

Species of bird

The olive finch (Arremon castaneiceps) is a species of bird in the family Passerellidae. Until recently, it was placed in the genus Lysurus.

It is found in the Andes of Colombia, Ecuador and far northern Peru where its natural habitat is subtropical or tropical moist montane forest. The olive finch is listed as Near Threatened by the IUCN Red List. The olive finch is related to the sooty-faced finch and ornithologist Carl Eduard Hallmayr even suggested they should be classified as the same species.

== Distribution and habitat ==
The olive finch is found in humid, low mountain forests, often near ravines, forest edges, rivers, and streams. It is found at elevations between 700-2200 meters in Columbia, 800-1800 m in Ecuador, and 750-1800 m in Peru.

== Appearance ==
The olive finch has olive green plumage with a chestnut crown and nape. The face and throat are dark gray, and the wings and tail are darker in color than the rest. The tail is more rounded compared to other Arremon species. A juvenile olive finch presents similarly to adults but with a duller crown, olive throat and face, and uneven plumage coloration. More specific information on the bird's molt and its timing is not available for this species. It has a brown or dark brown iris, black or dark gray bill, and black tarsi and toes. The olive finch has a length of 15.5-16.5 cm from the beak to end of its tail. Its linear measurements include a wingspan of 82-83 mm for males and a wingspan of approximately 76 mm for females, along with an average tail length of 66 mm. Their mass is between 34.5-39 grams for males and 32-35 grams for females.

== Breeding and nesting ==
The olive finch breeding season takes place in March, April, and June. Nests are large domes with a side entrance, often covered in moss, vines, ferns, or roots, and made of woven root pieces, bamboo leaves and fresh fern leaves. Nests are located on stream banks or vegetation near running water. Clutches contain 2 eggs which are mostly white but sometimes have small red-brown speckles concentrated near the larger end of the egg. Little information on sexual behavior exists but they are often seen in pairs.

== Diet ==
The olive finch forages in the understory of the forest, along with on the ground moving by hopping. Little is known on the diet of the olive finch but it is presumed to include seeds, along with reported findings of insect parts in its stomach contents.
