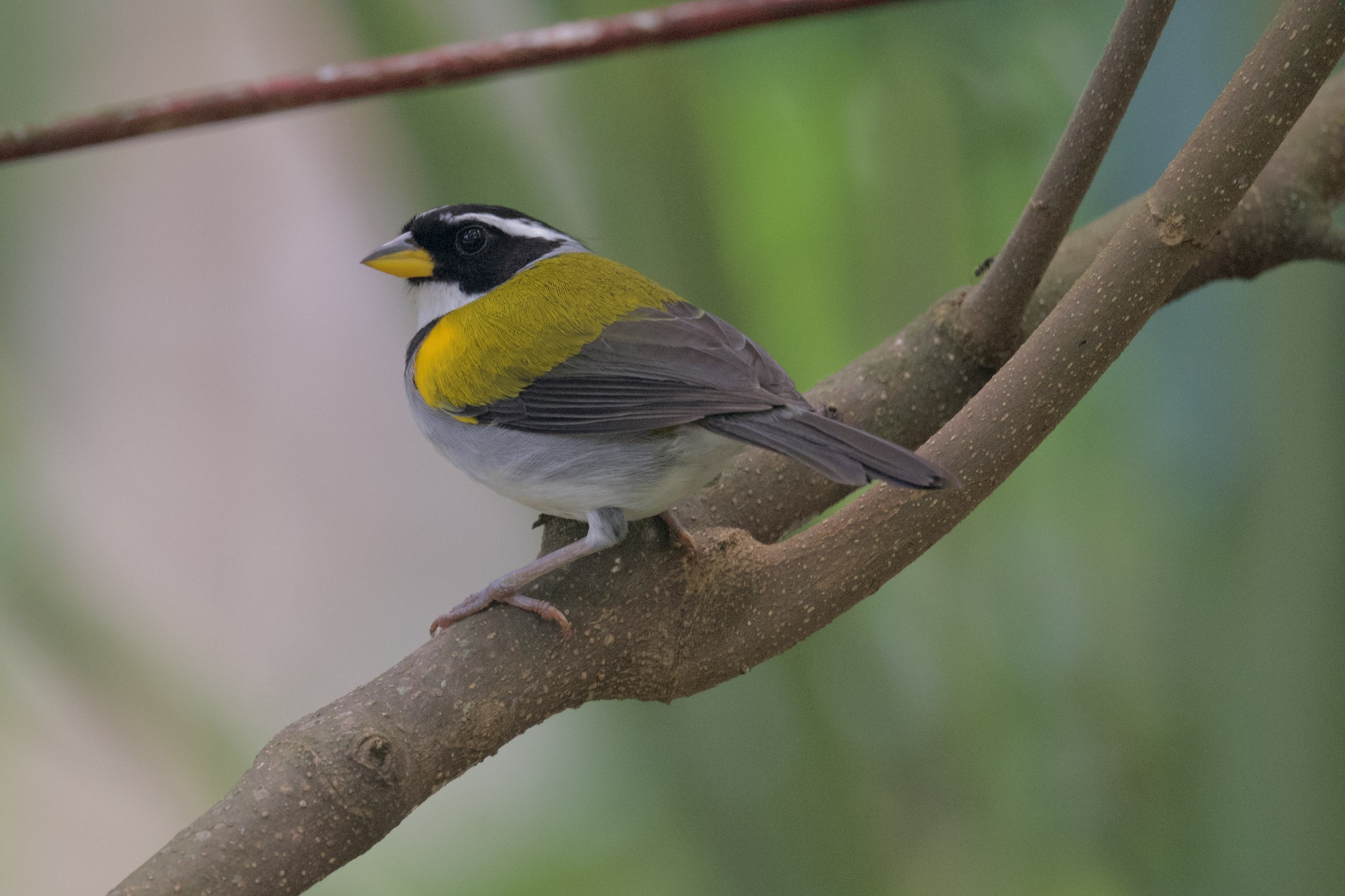
- Yellow-mandibled sparrow in Colombia

Conservation status
- Least Concern (IUCN 3.1)

Scientific classification
- Kingdom: Animalia
- Phylum: Chordata
- Class: Aves
- Order: Passeriformes
- Family: Passerellidae
- Genus: Arremon
- Species: A. axillaris

Binomial name
- Arremon axillaris Sclater, PL, 1854

= Yellow-mandibled sparrow =

Species of bird

The yellow-mandibled sparrow (Arremon axillaris) is a species of bird in the family Passerellidae. It is found in northeast Colombia and west Venezuela. Its natural habitat is subtropical or tropical moist lowland forests. It was formerly considered to be conspecific with the pectoral sparrow.

== Taxonomy ==
The yellow-mandibled sparrow was formally described in 1854 by the English zoologist Philip Sclater under the current binomial name Arremon axillaris. He specified the type locality as "Nova Grenada", the former Republic of New Granada which consisted primarily of present-day Colombia and Panama. The specific epithet axillaris is Latin meaning "of the armpit". The yellow-mandibled sparrow was formerly treated as a subspecies of the pectoral sparrow (Arremon taciturnus). It is now considered to be a separate species based on a phylogenetic study published in 2022 as well as the difference in bill colour and vocalization.

== Description ==
The yellow-mandibled sparrow is around 15 cm (5.9 in) in overall length and weighs 22–32 g (0.78–1.13 oz). The male has a black head with a narrow white supercilium and a grey stripe along the center of the crown. The throat and sides of the neck are white. The wing-coverts are yellowish green with the rest of the upperparts greenish-olive. It is white below except for the two sections of the black pectoral band which is broken in the middle. The bill is bicolor with a black upper mandible and a yellow lower mandible. The female is similar to the male but is creamy white below is generally less brightly coloured. The yellow-mandibled sparrow differs from the pectoral sparrow in having a yellowish lower mandible and more extensive yellow shoulders patches.

== Distribution and habitat ==
The species is found in Colombia on the eastern side of the Andes and north to western Venezuela. It occurs in the undergrowth of humid lowland forest.
