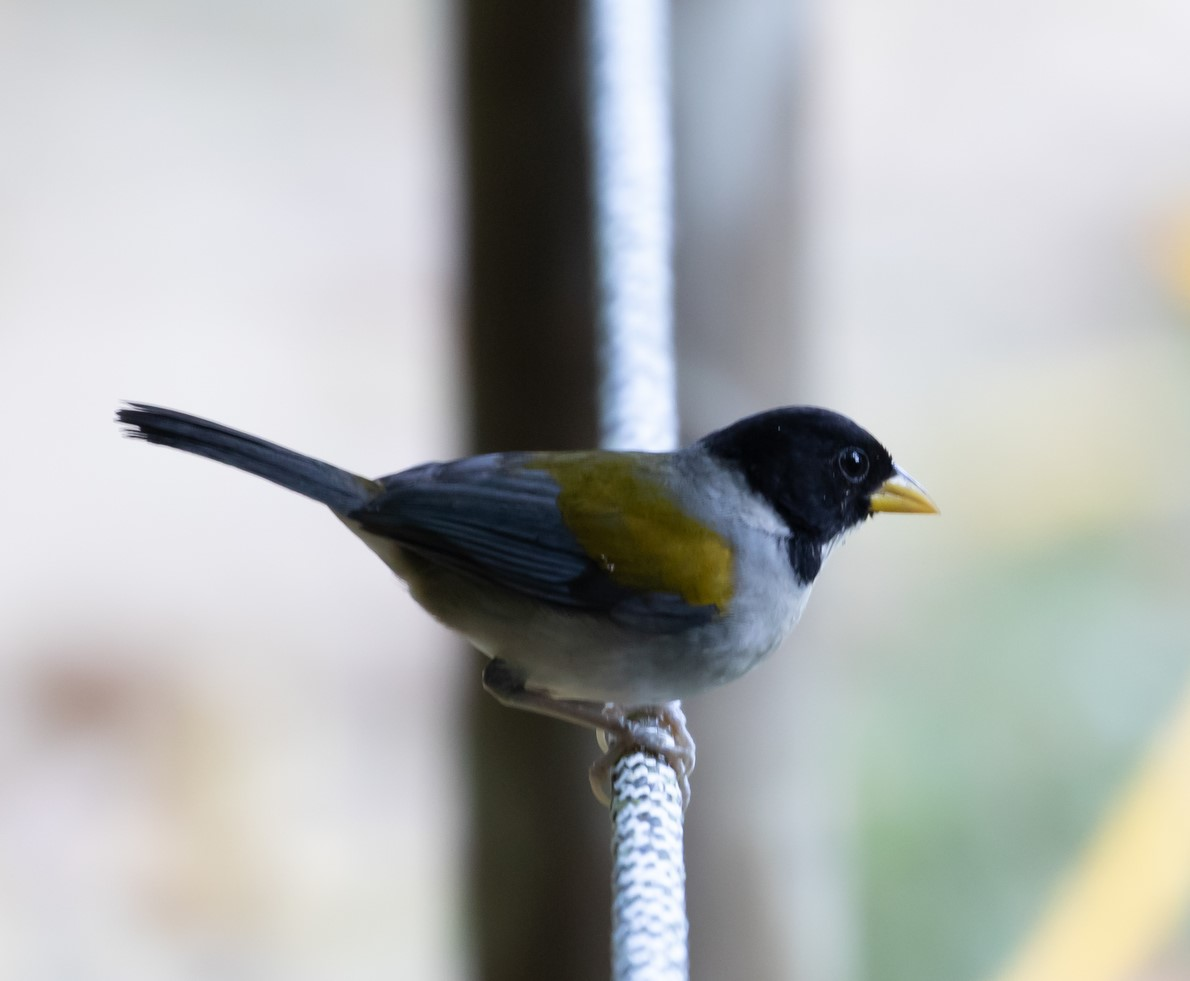

Conservation status
- Least Concern (IUCN 3.1)

Scientific classification
- Kingdom: Animalia
- Phylum: Chordata
- Class: Aves
- Order: Passeriformes
- Family: Passerellidae
- Genus: Arremon
- Species: A. schlegeli

Binomial name
- Arremon schlegeli Bonaparte, 1850

Synonyms
- Arremon schlegeli; Arremon fratruelis Wetmore, 1946; Arremon canidorsum J. T. Zimmer, 1941

= Golden-winged sparrow =

Species of bird

The Golden-winged sparrow (Arremon schlegeli) is a species of bird in the family Passerellidae that can found in Colombia and Venezuela. Its natural habitats are subtropical or tropical dry forests and subtropical or tropical dry shrubland.

== Characteristics ==
The Golden-winged sparrow can be identified by its black head, long yellow bill, gray upperparts, and a patch of green on its back. The Golden-winged sparrow is the only sparrow in its range with a completely black head. Their eyes are either brown or black. The bills of adults are yellow and the bills of juveniles are black. A male Golden-winged sparrow's face, malar, and chin are black. It has a white throat, gray nape, and green on its back. A female Golden-winged sparrow has buffier underparts. The average length of a Golden-winged sparrow is 150 mm. Females weigh approximately 23g, and males weigh approximately 32g.

== Behavior ==
Golden-winged sparrows feed on or above the ground on seeds, fruit, and insects. They forage both alone and in pairs, in forests with second growth and dry to humid weather. The species breeds during the wet season due to an increase in singing activity. The song of Golden-winged sparrows is commonly heard early in the morning during April and May. Their song is a high-pitched series of repeated notes, which have been described as the repetition of "Zeut-zeut-zeut-zee" or "Soot-soot-soot-see".

== Habitat ==
The Golden-winged sparrow lives in a terrestrial ecosystem. Its habitats include subtropical or tropical dry forests and shrubland, and subtropical or tropical heavily degraded former forest, either artificial or terrestrial.

The Golden winged sparrow also lives in woodlands or dry areas from the lowlands up to 1400 meters. Within these habitats, they reside in forests, second-growth, thickets, ravines, and hillsides.

== Subspecies and its distribution ==
So far, three subspecies of this bird have been recognized: A. s. schlegeli located along Caribbean costs of Colombia and Venezuela. A. s. fratruelis can be found in Serranía de Macuira, located on the Guajira Peninsula of northern Colombia. The other, A. s. canidorsum, can be found in the north Colombian Andes. The fratruelis subspecies is larger and has a longer bill than the schlegeli. The subspecies canidorsum is found on the west slope of the eastern Andes in Magdalena Valley, Colombia and has gray upperparts, white underparts, and does not have green on its back.

== Population ==
As of 2023, the population of the Golden-winged sparrow is stable. The population is classified as "Least Concern" by the IUCN Red List. The species also received this classification in 2012, 2009, 2008, and 2004. The Golden-winged sparrow does not meet the criteria for a vulnerable species due to multiple factors. Its large extent of occurrence is above the 20,000 km^2 threshold, it currently has a stable population trend, and the population has not experienced more than a 30% decline in over ten years as of the year 2023.

== Conservation ==
There have been conservation sites found throughout the range where the Golden-winged sparrow resides. The species has been found living in a protected area. However, there are still necessary conservation actions that need to be taken in the future.
