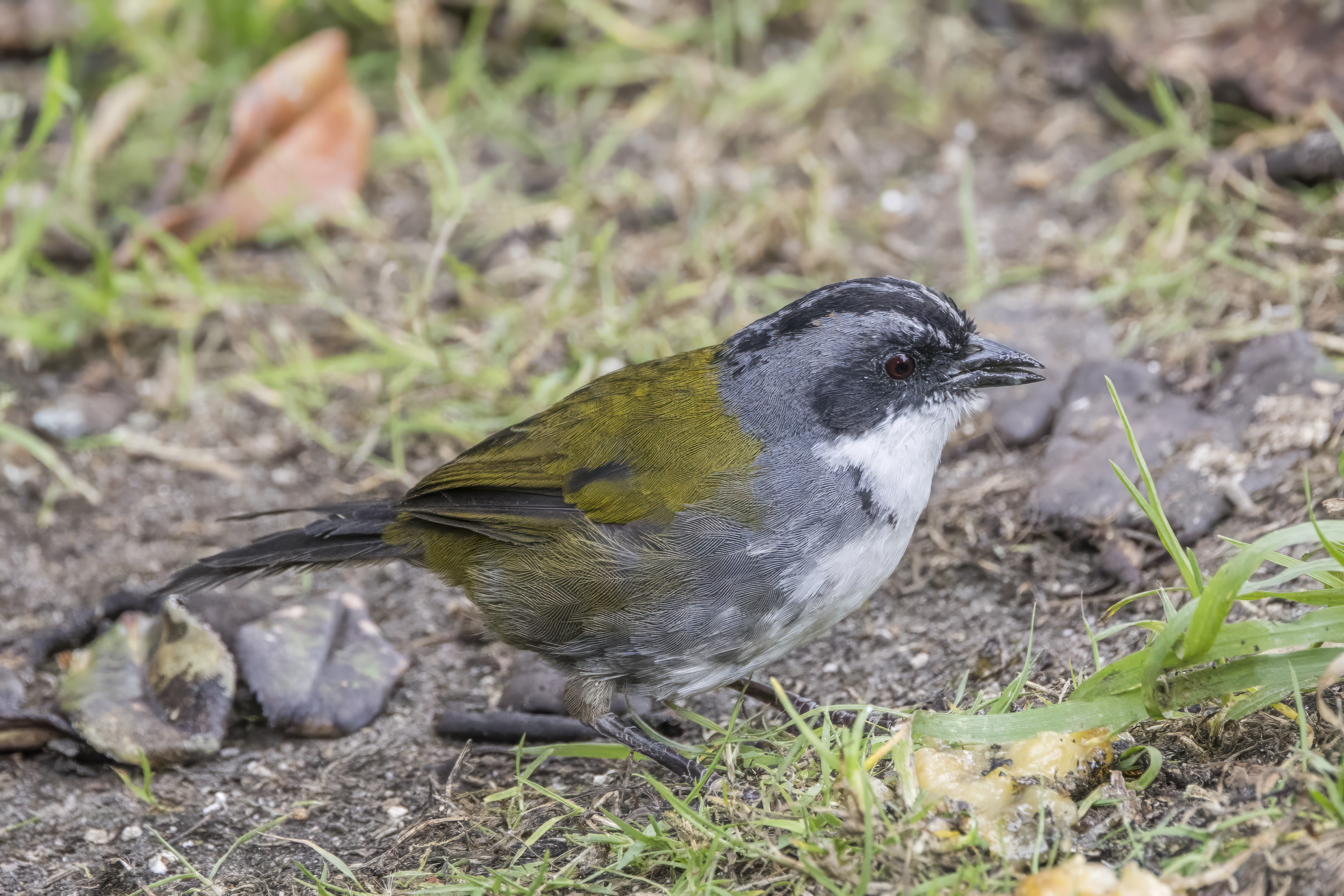
- A. a. assimilis, Colombia Song of Grey-browed Brush Finch

Conservation status
- Least Concern (IUCN 3.1)

Scientific classification
- Kingdom: Animalia
- Phylum: Chordata
- Class: Aves
- Order: Passeriformes
- Family: Passerellidae
- Genus: Arremon
- Species: A. assimilis

Binomial name
- Arremon assimilis (Boissonneau, 1840)

Synonyms
- See text

= Grey-browed brushfinch =

Species of bird

The grey-browed brushfinch (Arremon assimilis) is a species of bird in the family Passerellidae, the New World sparrows. It is found in Colombia, Ecuador, Peru and Venezuela.

== Taxonomy and systematics ==
The grey-browed brushfinch has a complicated taxonomic history. It was formally described in 1840 with the binomial Tanagra (Arrémon, Vieillot; Embernagra, Lesson) assimilis. It was later reassigned to the genus Buarremon that was later merged into genus Atlapetes. Further study resulted in Buarremon's being resurrected. Buarremon assimilis was later reassigned as one of many subspecies of what was then the "stripe-headed brushfinch" (Buarremon torquatus). In 2008 taxonomists began merging Buarremon into Arremon. Following a study published in 2010 and some earlier studies, taxonomists began splitting the "stripe-headed brushfinch" into eight species, one of which was the grey-browed brushfinch.

The grey-browed brushfinch has these four subspecies:

- A. a. larensis (Phelps, WH & Phelps, WH Jr, 1949)
- A. a. assimilis (Boissonneau, 1840)
- A. a. nigrifrons (Chapman, 1923)
- A. a. poliophrys (Berlepsch & Stolzmann, 1896)

A 2014 publication suggested that A. a. larensis might be a full species.

== Description ==
The grey-browed brushfinch is 19 to 20 cm (7.5 to 7.9 in) long. The sexes have the same plumage. Adults of the nominate subspecies A. a. assimilis have a black crown with a gray stripe in the middle and a gray supercilium that extends to the nape and wraps down around the back of the ear coverts to the sides of the breast. The rest of their face is black. Their upperparts, wings, and tail are olive-green. Their throat is white that continues through the breast and belly. The sides of their breast and flanks are gray and their vent grayish olive. Juveniles are generally olive with dusky cheeks.

Subspecies A. a. larensis has a wider gray supercilium than the nominate and a black band separating the throat and breast. A. a. nigrifrons' gray crown stripe begins farther back than the nominate's and its supercilium ends just past the eye. A. a. poliophrys has a black band between the throat and breast. All subspecies have a deep chestnut-brown iris, a black bill, and pinkish to gray legs and feet.

== Distribution and habitat ==
The grey-browed brushfinch has a disjunct distribution along the Andes from Venezuela to Peru. The subspecies are found thus:

- A. a. larensis: western Venezuela from northern Táchira north to southeastern Lara
- A. a. assimilis: from Mérida in western Venezuela south through all three ranges of the Colombian Andes and the Andes of Ecuador into northern Peru's Department of La Libertad
- A. a. nigrifrons: from southwestern Ecuador's El Oro and Loja provinces south in Peru to La Libertad
- A. a. poliophrys: Andes of central and southern Peru from the Department of Huánuco to the Department of Puno

The grey-browed brushfinch inhabits the interior and edges of humid montane forest and secondary forest. It ranges in elevation between 900 and 1,800 m (3,000 and 5,900 ft) in Venezuela, between 2,000 and 3,600 m (6,600 and 11,800 ft) in Colombia, between 1,900 and 3,500 m (6,200 and 11,500 ft) in the northern part of Ecuador, and between 900 and 3,000 m (3,000 and 9,800 ft) and locally much lower in the southern part. In far northwestern Peru it ranges between 400 and 750 m (1,300 and 2,500 ft) and elsewhere in the country between 1,200 and 3,500 m (3,900 and 11,500 ft).

== Behavior ==
=== Movement ===
The grey-browed brushfinch is a year-round resident.

=== Feeding ===
The grey-browed brushfinch's diet has not been studied. It typically forages singly or in pairs. It forages on the ground, usually under cover, scratching in leaf litter with its bill.

=== Breeding ===
The grey-browed brushfinch's breeding season has not been defined. However, it includes June in Colombia, July through September in Ecuador, and June, August, and November in Peru. Nothing else is known about the species' breeding biology.

=== Vocalization ===
The grey-browed brushfinch's song is "a high, sibilant series of thin whistles with short spaces between separate phrases (often of three elements), e.g. weseer-twee twesee? Sewtsee? Weseer-twee tweswee? Sewtswee?...". Its calls include "a high ti and a tseer".

== Status ==
The IUCN has assessed the grey-browed brushfinch as being of Least Concern. It has a very large range; its population size is not known and is believed to be decreasing. No immediate threats have been identified. It is considered uncommon to common in Venezuela, common in Colombia, "widespread" in Ecuador, and fairly common in Peru.
