= Black-headed brushfinch =

Conservation status
- Least Concern (IUCN 3.1)

Scientific classification
- Kingdom: Animalia
- Phylum: Chordata
- Class: Aves
- Order: Passeriformes
- Family: Passerellidae
- Genus: Arremon
- Species: A. atricapillus

Binomial name
- Arremon atricapillus (Lawrence, 1874)

Synonyms
- See text

Species of bird

The black-headed brushfinch (Arremon atricapillus) is a species of bird in the family Emberizidae, the New World sparrows. It is found in Colombia and Panama.

== Taxonomy and systematics ==
The black-headed brushfinch has a complicated taxonomic history. It was formally described in 1874 with the binomial Buarremon atricapillus. The genus Buarremon was later merged into genus Atlapetes. Further study resulted in Buarremon's being resurrected. Buarremon atricapillus was later reassigned as one of many subspecies of what was then the "stripe-headed brushfinch" (Buarremon torquatus). In 2008 taxonomists began merging Buarremon into Arremon. Following a study published in 2010 and some earlier studies, taxonomists began splitting the "stripe-headed brushfinch" into eight species, one of which was the black-headed brushfinch.

The black-headed brushfinch has two subspecies, the nominate A. a. atricapillus (Lawrence, 1874) and A. a. tacarcunae (Chapman, 1923).

== Description ==
The black-headed brushfinch is about 19 cm (7.5 in) long and weighs about 49.5 g (1.7 oz). The sexes have the same plumage. Adults have an almost entirely black head with a white throat. Their upperparts, wings, and tail are olive-green. The white of the throat continues through the breast and belly. The sides of their breast are gray and their flanks and vent are grayish olive. They have a dark chestnut-brown iris, a black bill, and blackish legs and feet. Juveniles have a greenish olive head and upperparts, dull brown wings and tail, and tawny underparts. Subspecies A. a. tacarcunae is very similar to the nominate but with a faint gray stripe in the middle of the crown and a faint gray supercilium.

== Distribution and habitat ==
The black-headed brushfinch has a highly disjunct distribution. Subspecies A. a. tacarcunae is the more northerly of the two. It is found in Panama in eastern Panamá, eastern Guna Yala (San Blas) , and eastern Darién provinces. The nominate is found discontinuously in the Western, Central, and Eastern ranges of the Colombian Andes. The species inhabits lowland and montane evergreen forest, secondary forest, and elfin forest, where it favors dense undergrowth in the interior and edges. Sources differ on its elevation range. One states it is 700 to 1,000 m (2,300 to 3,300 ft); a more recent one states it is 500 to 1,500 m (1,600 to 4,900 ft). A third places its upper limit at 3,300 m (10,800 ft).

== Behavior ==
=== Movement ===
The black-headed brushfinch is a year-round resident.

=== Feeding ===
The black-headed brushfinch's diet has not been studied but is known to include insects and seeds. It typically forages singly or in pairs. It forages on the ground, usually under vegetative cover, scratching in leaf litter with its bill.

=== Breeding ===
The black-headed brushfinch breeds between April and June. Nothing else is known about the species' breeding biology.

=== Vocalization ===
The black-headed brushfinch's song is "a high-pitched series of rambling notes which proceed without breaks" and its call is "a sharp note".

== Status ==
The IUCN has assessed the black-headed brushfinch as being of Least Concern. Though its overall range spans about 305,000 km^{2} (118,000 sq mi) its actual area of occupancy is unknown. Its population size is not known and is believed to be decreasing. No immediate threats have been identified. It is considered "uncommon and local, sometimes fairly common".
