= Paria brushfinch =

Conservation status
- Vulnerable (IUCN 3.1)

Scientific classification
- Kingdom: Animalia
- Phylum: Chordata
- Class: Aves
- Order: Passeriformes
- Family: Passerellidae
- Genus: Arremon
- Species: A. phygas

Binomial name
- Arremon phygas (Berlepsch, 1912)

Synonyms
- See text

Species of bird

The Paria brushfinch (Arremon phygas) is a species of bird in the family Passerellidae, the New World sparrows. It is endemic to Venezuela.

== Taxonomy and systematics ==
The Paria brushfinch has a complicated taxonomic history. It was formally described in 1912 as a subspecies of the stripe-headed brushfinch with the trinomial Buarremon torquatus phygas. The genus Buarremon was later merged into genus Atlapetes. Further study resulted in Buarremon's being resurrected. In 2008 taxonomists began merging Buarremon into Arremon. Following a study published in 2010 and some earlier studies, taxonomists began splitting the "stripe-headed brushfinch" into eight species, one of which was the Paria brushfinch.

The Paria brushfinch is monotypic.

== Description ==
The Paria brushfinch is about 19 cm (7.5 in) long. The sexes have the same plumage. Adults have a black crown with a hint of a gray stripe in the middle and a whitish supercilium that begins behind the eye. The rest of their face is black. The side of their neck is gray and that color extends down to meet the breast. Their upperparts, wings, and tail are olive-green. Their throat is white with a black band below it. The center of their breast and belly is white and their sides and flanks are gray with a greenish tinge on the last. They have a deep chestnut-brown iris, a black bill, and blackish legs and feet. Juveniles have a dusky olive head and upperparts with a pale olive supercilium. Their underparts are grayish cinnamon with a slightly lighter throat. Their mandible is grayish.

== Distribution and habitat ==
The Paria brushfinch is found in the northeastern section of the Venezuelan Coastal Ranges. It is found on the Paria Peninsula in Sucre state and adjoining northeastern Anzoátegui and northern Monagas states. It inhabits humid montane forest where it favors the interior undergrowth, though it also is sometimes at the forest edges. In elevation it ranges between 920 and 1,500 m (3,000 and 4,900 ft).

== Behavior ==
=== Movement ===
The Paria brushfinch is a year-round resident.

=== Feeding ===
The Paria brushfinch's diet has not been studied. It forages singly and in pairs. It forages on the ground, usually under vegetative cover, pushing aside leaf litter with its bill.

=== Breeding ===
The Paria brushfinch breeds between May and July but nothing else is known about the species' breeding biology.

=== Vocalization ===
The Paria brushfinch's song is "a high-pitched and sibilant éé-sit, ezzaweet...éé-sit...ezzaseet...ease-sit...tséé-a-teet..." that rambles without well-defined breaks.

== Status ==
The IUCN has assessed the Paria brushfinch as Vulnerable. Though its overall range is estimated at 7,060 km^{2} (2,700 sq mi), its actual area of occupancy within it is not known. Its population size is not known and is believed to be decreasing. "There has been widespread clearance for agriculture in the Turimiquire Massif and the Paria Peninsula and both regions are considered highly threatened." It is known from a small number of scattered locations and is considered "uncommon to rare, and possibly very local". It occurs in two national parks but they lack effective environmental protection.
