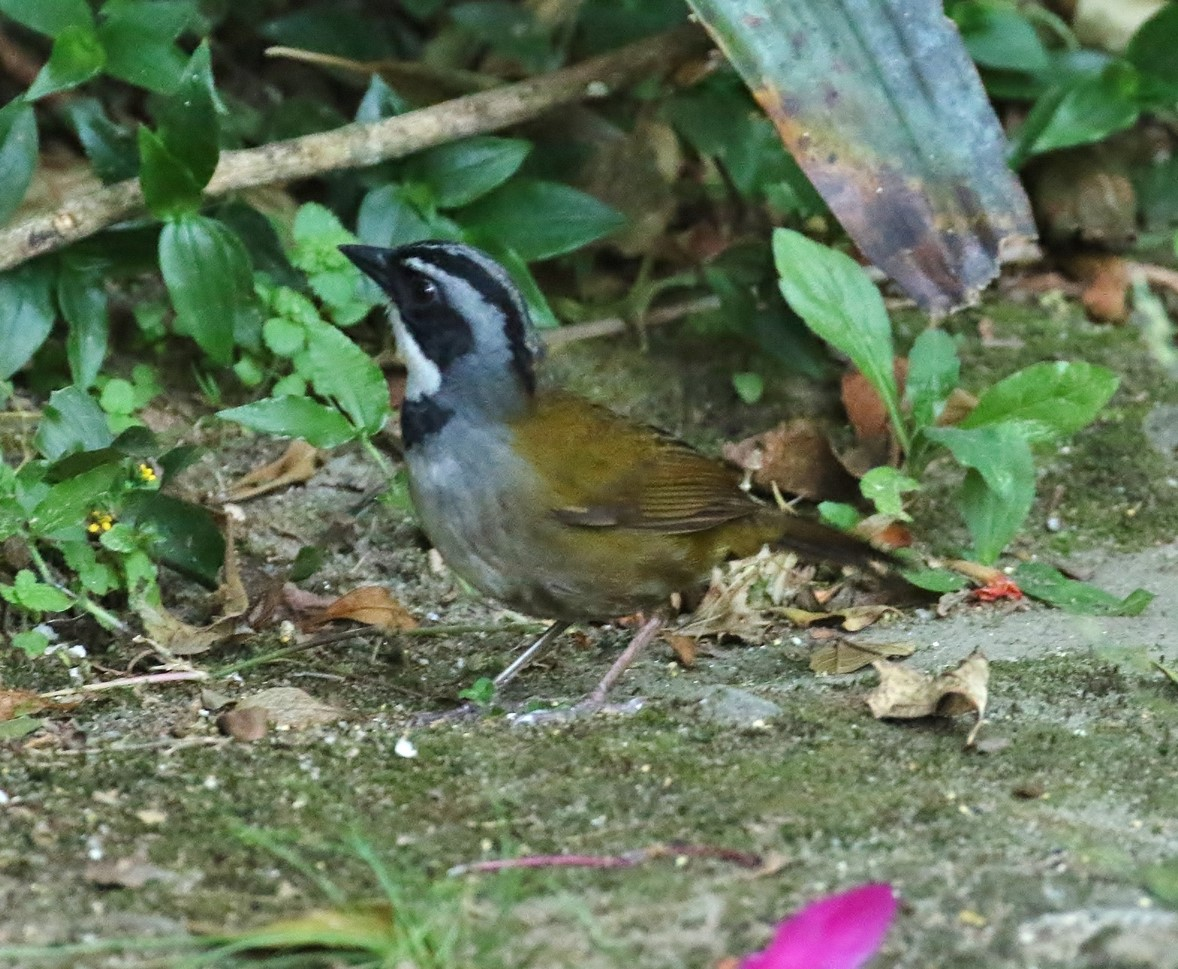
- In Magdalena, Colombia

Conservation status
- Near Threatened (IUCN 3.1)

Scientific classification
- Kingdom: Animalia
- Phylum: Chordata
- Class: Aves
- Order: Passeriformes
- Family: Passerellidae
- Genus: Arremon
- Species: A. basilicus

Binomial name
- Arremon basilicus (Bangs, 1898)

Synonyms
- See text

= Sierra Nevada brushfinch =

Species of bird

The Sierra Nevada brushfinch (Arremon basilicus) is a Near Threatened species of bird in the family Passerellidae, the New World sparrows. It is endemic to Colombia.

== Taxonomy and systematics ==
The Sierra Nevada brushfinch has a complicated taxonomic history. It was formally described in 1898 with the binomial Buarremon basilicus. Somewhat later it was reassigned as a subspecies of what was then called the stripe-headed brushfinch, Buarremon torquatus. In 2008 taxonomists began merging Buarremon into Arremon. Following a study published in 2010 and some earlier studies, taxonomists began splitting the "stripe-headed brushfinch" into eight species, one of which was the Sierra Nevada brushfinch.

The Sierra Nevada brushfinch is monotypic.

== Description ==
The Sierra Nevada brushfinch is about 19 cm (7.5 in) long. The sexes have the same plumage. Adults have a black crown with a gray stripe in the middle, a gray supercilium that extends to the nape and continues behind the ear coverts. The rest of their face is black. Their upperparts, wings, and tail are olive-green. Their throat is white with a narrow black band below it. The center of their breast and belly is white and their sides, flanks, and vent are brownish olive. They have a dark chestnut-brown iris, a black bill, and blackish legs and feet. Juveniles have an unstriped dusky head with browner upperparts than adults and pale brownish underparts with dark brown streaks.

== Distribution and habitat ==
The Sierra Nevada brushfinch is found only in the isolated Sierra Nevada de Santa Marta in far northern Colombia. It inhabits humid montane forest where it favors the undergrowth at the edges. In elevation it ranges between 600 and 2,800 m (2,000 and 9,200 ft).

== Behavior ==
=== Movement ===
The Sierra Nevada brushfinch is a year-round resident.

=== Feeding ===
The Sierra Nevada brushfinch's diet has not been studied. It forages singly and in pairs. It forages on the ground, usually under vegetative cover, pushing aside leaf litter with its bill.

=== Breeding ===
The Sierra Nevada brushfinch's breeding season has not been defined but includes at least March to July. Nothing else is known about the species' breeding biology.

=== Vocalization ===
The Sierra Nevada brushfinch's song is "a high-pitched sibilant series of notes...with very fast delivery and almost nervous sound, this due also to inclusion of some quavering high-pitched whistles". Its call is "a sharp note".

== Status ==
The IUCN has assessed the Sierra Nevada brushfinch as Near Threatened. It has a restricted range; its estimated population of between 10,000 and 20,000 mature individuals is believed to be stable. "The Sierra Nevada de Santa Marta is increasingly being destroyed and fragmented by illegal agricultural expansion, logging and burning". However, because the species uses edge habitat, "the impacts on the population size are likely negligible". It is considered locally common in its small range.
