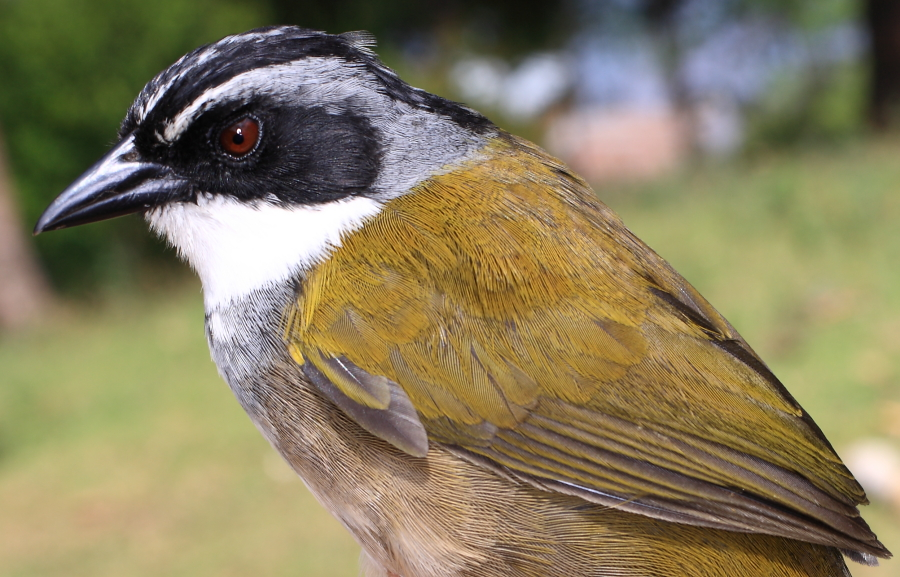

Conservation status
- Least Concern (IUCN 3.1)

Scientific classification
- Kingdom: Animalia
- Phylum: Chordata
- Class: Aves
- Order: Passeriformes
- Family: Passerellidae
- Genus: Arremon
- Species: A. perijanus

Binomial name
- Arremon perijanus (Phelps, WH & Gilliard, 1940)

Synonyms
- See text

= Perijá brushfinch =

Perija brushfinch

Species of bird

The Perija brushfinch (Note: The IOC and other taxonomic systems spell the English name with no diacritics. The IOC is the Wikipedia standard for bird names.) (Arremon perijanus) is a species of bird in the family Emberizidae, the New World sparrows. It is found in Colombia and Venezuela.

== Taxonomy and systematics ==
The Perija brushfinch was formally described in 1940 as a subspecies of the stripe-headed brushfinch with the trinomial Atlapetes torquatus perijanus. The species' previous genus Buarremon had earlier been merged into Atlapetes but it was resurrected in 2007 yielding Buarremon torquatus perijanus. In 2008 taxonomists began merging Buarremon into Arremon; by that time the "stripe-headed brushfinch" had acquired multiple subspecies. Following a study published in 2010 and some earlier studies, taxonomists began splitting the "stripe-headed brushfinch" into eight species, one of which was the Perija brushfinch.

The Perija brushfinch is monotypic.

== Description ==
The Perija brushfinch is about 19 cm (7.5 in) long. The sexes have the same plumage. Adults have a black crown with a gray stripe in the middle and a gray supercilium that extends to the nape and continues down behind the ear coverts and along the side of the breast. The rest of their face is black. Their upperparts, wings, and tail are olive-green. Their throat is white with a narrow black band below it. The center of their breast and belly is white and their sides past the gray, flanks, and vent are grayish cinnamon. They have a chestnut-brown to deep reddish iris, a black bill, and blackish legs and feet.

== Distribution and habitat ==
The Perija brushfinch is found in the Serranía del Perijá that straddles the border between northern Colombia and western Venezuela. It inhabits humid montane forest where it favors the undergrowth at the edges. In elevation it ranges between 700 and 1,900 m (2,300 and 6,200 ft).

== Behavior ==
=== Movement ===
The Perija brushfinch is a year-round resident.

=== Feeding ===
The Perija brushfinch's diet has not been studied. It forages singly and in pairs. It forages on the ground, usually under vegetative cover, pushing aside leaf litter with its bill.

=== Breeding ===
Perija brushfinches in breeding condition have been recorded between February and August. Nothing else is known about the species' breeding biology.

=== Vocalization ===
The Perija brushfinch's song is "a very high-pitched, hummingbird-like song. It consists of a 3-note phrase seeuw.. see.. teechew constantly repeated" and lasting about two seconds.

== Status ==
The IUCN originally in 2016 assessed the Perija brushfinch as Vulnerable but since 2023 as being of Least Concern. It has a small range; its population size is not known but is believed to be stable. "Forests below the species' range are under threat from a range of processes...While much of the range is inaccessible and large tracts of undisturbed habitat remain, encroachment is slowly proceeding in lower parts of the range."
