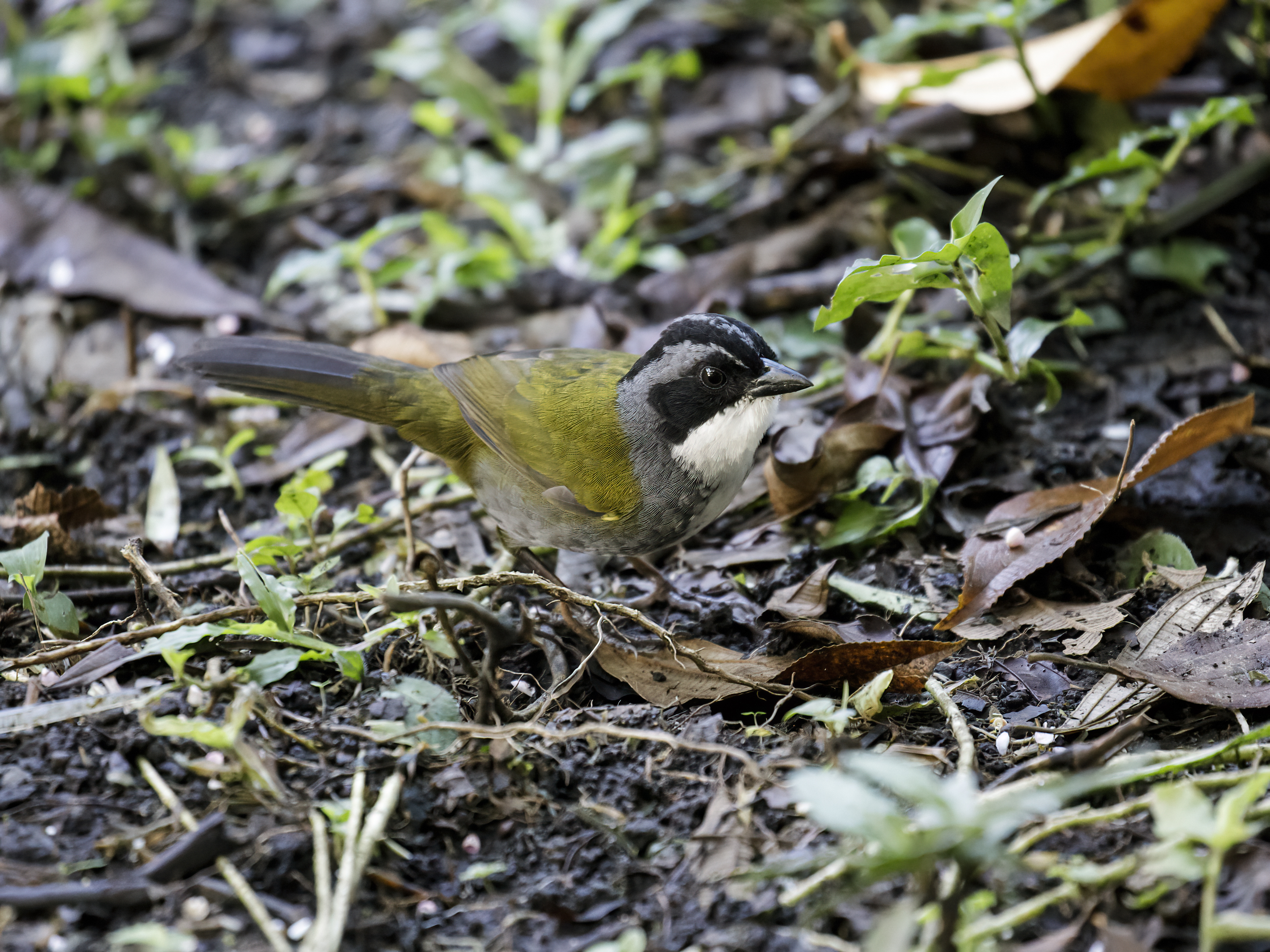

Conservation status
- Least Concern (IUCN 3.1)

Scientific classification
- Kingdom: Animalia
- Phylum: Chordata
- Class: Aves
- Order: Passeriformes
- Family: Passerellidae
- Genus: Arremon
- Species: A. costaricensis

Binomial name
- Arremon costaricensis (Bangs, 1907)

Synonyms
- See text

= Costa Rican brushfinch =

Species of bird

The Costa Rican brushfinch (Arremon costaricensis) is a species of bird in the family Passerellidae, the New World sparrows. It is found in Costa Rica and Panama.

== Taxonomy and systematics ==
The Costa Rican brushfinch has a complicated taxonomic history. It was formally described in 1907 with the binomial Buarremon costaricensis. The genus Buarremon was later merged into genus Atlapetes but further study resulted in Buarremon's being resurrected. Buarremon costaricensis was later reassigned as one of many subspecies of what was then the "stripe-headed brushfinch" (Buarremon torquatus). In 2008 taxonomists began merging Buarremon into Arremon. Following a study published in 2010 and some earlier studies, taxonomists began splitting the "stripe-headed brushfinch" into eight species, one of which was the Costa Rican brushfinch.

The Costa Rican brushfinch is monotypic.

== Description ==
The Costa Rican brushfinch is 17 to 20 cm (6.7 to 7.9 in) long and weighs 40 to 49.5 g (1.4 to 1.7 oz). The sexes have the same plumage. Adults have a black crown with a gray stripe in the middle and a gray supercilium that extends to the nape and continues down behind the ear coverts. The rest of their face is black. Their upperparts, wings, and tail are olive-green. Their throat is white with a narrow gray band below it. The center of their breast and belly is white, their sides and flanks gray, and their vent and undertail coverts olive-tinged. They have a dark reddish iris, a dark gray bill, and dark pink legs and feet. Juveniles are sooty black rather than jet black on the head with a gray breast and buff belly.

== Distribution and habitat ==
The Costa Rican brushfinch is found in the Pacific foothills from central Puntarenas Province and northern San José Province in Costa Rica south into western Panama's Chiriquí Province. It primarily inhabits the undergrowth of humid tropical forest and also occurs at the forest's edge, in bamboo thickets, and in gardens near its main habitat. In elevation it ranges from 240 to 1,500 m (800 to 4,900 ft) overall and 300 to 1,200 m (1,000 to 3,900 ft) in Costa Rica.

== Behavior ==
=== Movement ===
The Costa Rican brushfinch is a year-round resident.

=== Feeding ===
The Costa Rican brushfinch feeds on insects and seeds. It forages on or near the ground.

=== Breeding ===
The Costa Rican brushfinch breeds between February and September. Its nest is a cup made from a variety of plant fibers lined with finer fibers. It typically is in dense vegetation between about 2 and 4 m (7 and 13 ft) above the ground. The clutch is two eggs. The female alone incubates, for about 15 days. Fledging occurs about 12 days after hatch and both parents provision nestlings.

=== Vocalization ===
The Costa Rican brushfinch's song is "high-pitched and thin, a relatively simple series of 1–3 alternated, distinct high-pitched phrases interspersed with silent periods". Its call is "sharp and metallic".

== Status ==
The IUCN has assessed the Costa Rican brushfinch as being of Least Concern. It has a small range; its estimated population is at least 20,000 mature individuals but its trend is unknown. No immediate threats have been identified. It is considered uncommon in Costa Rica.
