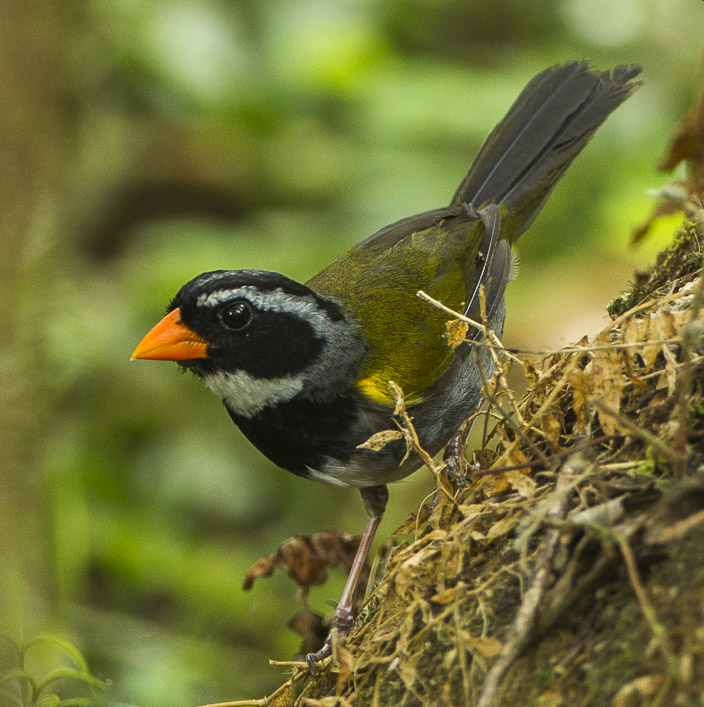

Conservation status
- Least Concern (IUCN 3.1)

Scientific classification
- Kingdom: Animalia
- Phylum: Chordata
- Class: Aves
- Order: Passeriformes
- Family: Passerellidae
- Genus: Arremon
- Species: A. aurantiirostris

Binomial name
- Arremon aurantiirostris Lafresnaye, 1847

Audio
- Song

= Orange-billed sparrow =

Species of bird

The orange-billed sparrow (Arremon aurantiirostris) is a species of bird in the family Passerellidae, the New World sparrows. It is found from Mexico to Peru.

== Taxonomy and systematics ==
The orange-billed sparrow was formally described in 1847 with its current binomial Arremon aurantiirostris.

The orange-billed sparrow has these eight subspecies:

- A. a. saturatus Cherrie, 1891
- A. a. rufidorsalis Cassin, 1865
- A. a. aurantiirostris Lafresnaye, 1847
- A. a. strictocollaris Todd, 1922
- A. a. occidentalis Hellmayr, 1911
- A. a. santarosae Chapman, 1925
- A. a. erythrorhynchus Sclater, PL, 1855
- A. a. spectabilis Sclater, PL, 1855

== Description ==
The orange-billed sparrow is 14.5 to 16.5 cm (5.7 to 6.5 in) long and weighs about 35 g (1.2 oz). The sexes have the same plumage and all subspecies have the eponymous bright orange bill. Adults of the nominate subspecies A. a. aurantiirostris have a black crown with a gray stripe along its middle and a wide white supercilium on an otherwise black face. Their upperparts are olive-green and their wings and tail a darker olive-green with yellow at the bend of the wing. Their chin has a small black area and their throat is white with a wide black band below it across the upper upper breast. Their flanks and undertail coverts are brownish gray to olive-green and the rest of their underparts grayish white. They have a very dark brown iris and light brown legs and feet. Juveniles have sooty olive upperparts and breast with a slightly paler olive supercilium and throat. Their belly is dingy buffy olive and their flanks and undertail coverts are darker and browner.

The other subspecies of the orange-billed sparrow are similar to the nominate but differ from it and each other thus:

- A. a. saturatus: wider supercilium begins near nostrils, somewhat darker green upperparts, wider breast band, and darker dusky wash on sides and flanks
- A. a. rufidorsalis: wider supercilium begins near nostrils and somewhat darker green upperparts
- A. a. strictocollaris: slightly darker upperparts and orange-yellow bend of the wing
- A. a. occidentalis: intense olive-green upperparts with golden wash and lemon-yellow bend of the wing
- A. a. erythrorhynchus: much paler back with light yellow bend of the wing; little or no black spot on the chin
- A. a. spectabilis: reddish or brownish olive back and bright orange bend of the wing
- A. a. santarosae: similar to erythrorhynchus with browner back and wider breast band

== Distribution and habitat ==
The orange-billed sparrow has a disjunct distribution. Most subspecies' ranges are contiguous with that of at least one other but that of A. a. spectabilis is separate. The subspecies are found thus:

- A. a. saturatus: from Veracruz and Oaxaca in southern Mexico through Tabasco and Chiapas into northern Guatemala and southern Belize
- A. a. rufidorsalis: Caribbean slope from Honduras south through Nicaragua and Costa Rica into extreme northwestern Panama
- A. a. aurantiirostris: Pacific slope from Costa Rica's central Puntarenas and northern San José provinces south into Panama, where on both Pacific and Caribbean slopes to the Canal Zone
- A. a. strictocollaris: from the Canal Zone into northwestern Colombia's Chocó Department
- A. a. occidentalis: Pacific slope from Colombia's Chocó Department south through Ecuador to southern Manabí and Guayas provinces
- A. a. santarosae: from southern Guayas in Ecuador south into extreme northwestern Peru's Tumbes Department
- A. a. erythrorhynchus: valleys of Colombia's Magadalena, lower Cauca, and lower Sinú rivers
- A. a. spectabilis: from far southern Colombia's Putumayo Department south through eastern Ecuador into northern Peru as far as Huánuco Department

The orange-billed sparrow primarily inhabits the understory of humid primary and secondary evergreen forest in the tropical zone. It also occasionally occurs at the forest edge and in nearby plantations and gardens. In Mexico and Central America it ranges in elevation from sea level to about 1,250 m (4,100 ft). However, in Guatemala, Belize, and Honduras it reaches only 900 m (3,000 ft). It is found below 1,300 m (4,300 ft) in Colombia, mostly below 1,100 m (3,600 ft) in Ecuador, and between 300 and 1,100 m (1,000 and 3,600 ft) in Peru.

== Behavior ==
=== Movement ===
The orange-billed sparrow is a year-round resident.

=== Feeding ===
The orange-billed sparrow's diet has not been extensively studied but is known to include insects, spiders, seeds, and fruits. It usually is seen in pairs or small family groups. It forages on the ground, where it scratches in leaf litter, or near it in low vegetation to glean prey and fruit. It only rarely attends army ant swarms.

=== Breeding ===
The orange-billed sparrow breeds between April and August. Its nest is a bulky ball with a side entrance and is made from a variety of coarse plant material lined with finer fibers. Most nests are on the ground. The clutch is two eggs that are glossy white with sparse brown and black speckles. In one study the incubation period was 14 to 17 days and fledging occurred about 14 days after hatch. Apparently only the female incubates and both parents provision nestlings.

=== Vocalization ===
The orange-billed sparrow's song varies geographically though in general is "high-pitched, either a series of alternating lilting notes or thin whistles". In northern Central America it is an "extremely high-pitched series of sharp whistles" that lasts about two seconds; its call there is a "smacking tsiit!". On the Pacific side of Costa Rica it sings "a medley of shrill, tinkling notes"; the song on the Caribbean side "lacks the tinkling quality". In western Ecuador it sings "a very high-pitched, fast, and jumbled series of notes, e.g. tsu-t-t-ti-tu-ti-t-t" that lasts only a second. In the east it sings a "series of buzzy notes, e.g. tzeeeee-zee-zee-tzeeeeeet".

== Status ==
The IUCN has assessed the orange-billed sparrow as being of Least Concern. It has a very large range; its estimated population of at least 50,000 mature individuals is believed to be decreasing. No immediate threats have been identified. It is considered "frequent to common" overall in Mexico and Central America. It is "uncommon to fairly common" in northern Central America and common in Costa Rica. It is common in Colombia and Ecuador and uncommon in Peru. "The Orange-billed Sparrow is dependent on threatened tropical lowland evergreen forest habitats. The primary threat to this species is the loss of its primary lowland tropical forest habitat from logging or by conversion for agriculture, including for livestock production, bananas, or coffee at higher elevations."
