= Caracas brushfinch =

Conservation status
- Least Concern (IUCN 3.1)

Scientific classification
- Kingdom: Animalia
- Phylum: Chordata
- Class: Aves
- Order: Passeriformes
- Family: Passerellidae
- Genus: Arremon
- Species: A. phaeopleurus

Binomial name
- Arremon phaeopleurus (Sclater, PL, 1856)

Synonyms
- See text

Species of bird

The Caracas brushfinch (Arremon phaeopleurus) is a species of bird in the family Passerellidae, the New World sparrows. It is endemic to Venezuela.

== Taxonomy and systematics ==
The Caracas brushfinch has a complicated taxonomic history. It was formally described in 1856 with the binomial Buarremon phaeopleurus. The genus Buarremon was later merged into genus Atlapetes. Further study resulted in Buarremon's being resurrected. Buarremon phaeopleurus was later reassigned as one of many subspecies of what was then the "stripe-headed brushfinch" (Buarremon torquatus). In 2008 taxonomists began merging Buarremon into Arremon. Following a study published in 2010 and some earlier studies, taxonomists began splitting the "stripe-headed brushfinch" into eight species, one of which was the Caracas brushfinch.

The Caracas brushfinch is monotypic.

== Description ==
The Caracas brushfinch is about 19 cm (7.5 in) long. The sexes have the same plumage. Adults have a black crown with a gray stripe in the middle and a grayish white supercilium that extends to the nape and continues down behind the ear coverts to the sides of the breast. The rest of their face is black. Their upperparts, wings, and tail are olive-green. Their throat is white with a black band below it. The center of their breast and belly is white and their flanks and vent are olive-buff. They have a chestnut-brown iris, a black bill, and pinkish to blackish legs and feet.

== Distribution and habitat ==
The Caracas brushfinch is found in the Venezuelan Coastal Range from northern Guárico to Aragua. It inhabits humid montane forest where it favors the undergrowth in the interior and especially the edges. In elevation it ranges between 700 and 1,800 m (2,300 and 5,900 ft).

== Behavior ==
=== Movement ===
The Caracas brushfinch is a year-round resident.

=== Feeding ===
The Caracas brushfinch's diet has not been studied. It forages singly and in pairs. It forages on the ground, usually under vegetative cover, pushing aside leaf litter with its bill.

=== Breeding ===
The Caracas brushfinch breeds between May and July. Nothing else is known about the species' breeding biology.

=== Vocalization ===
The Caracas brushfinch's song is "very high-pitched, almost hummingbird-like [and] typically consists of a three to five-note phrase repeated continuously".

== Status ==
The IUCN has assessed the Caracas brushfinch as being of Least Concern. It has a limited range; its population size is not known but is believed to be stable. No immediate threats have been identified. It is found in "several well-conserved protected areas".
