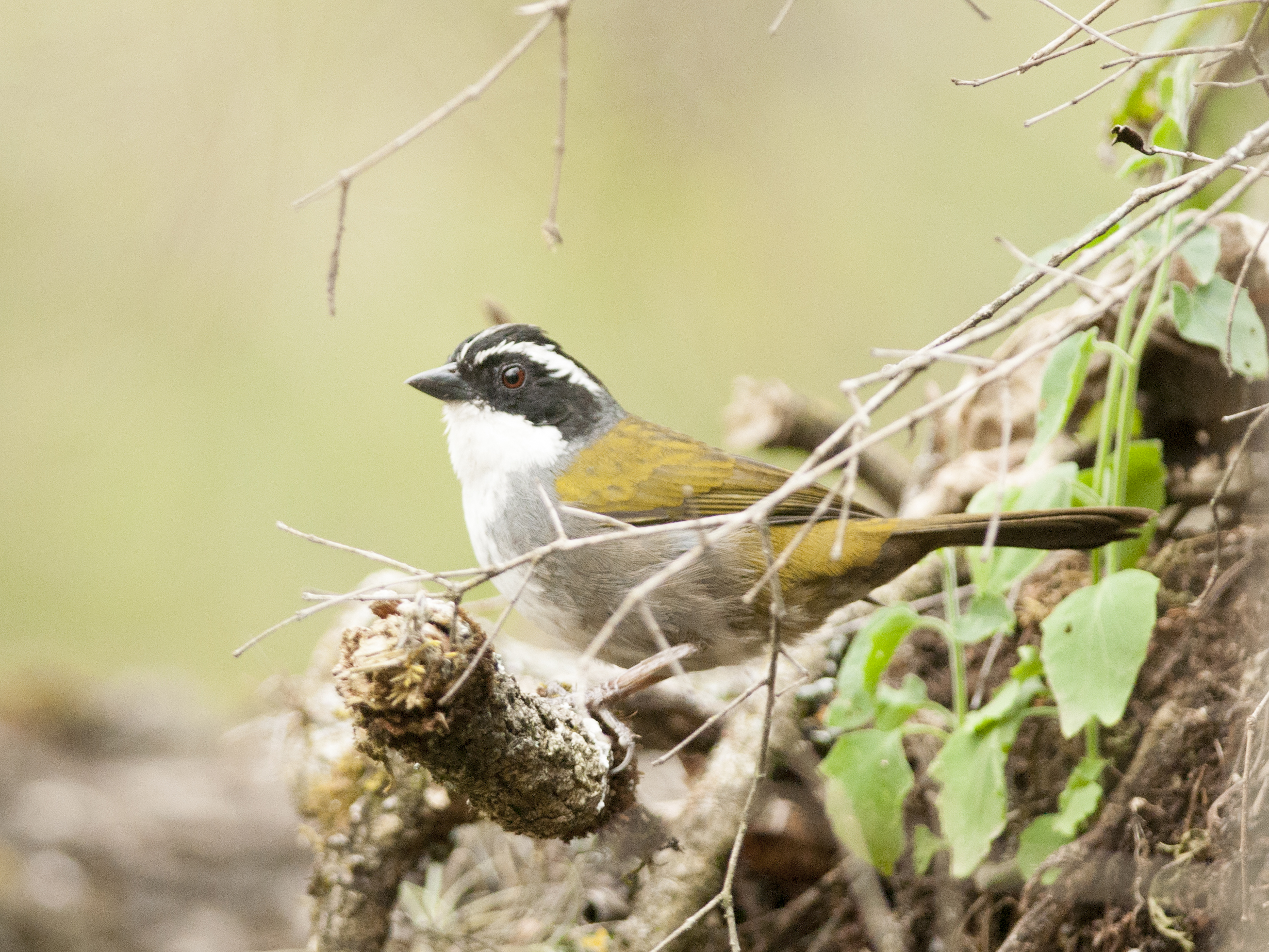

Conservation status
- Least Concern (IUCN 3.1)

Scientific classification
- Kingdom: Animalia
- Phylum: Chordata
- Class: Aves
- Order: Passeriformes
- Family: Passerellidae
- Genus: Arremon
- Species: A. torquatus

Binomial name
- Arremon torquatus (Lafresnaye & d'Orbigny, 1837)

Synonyms
- See text

= White-browed brushfinch =

Species of bird

The white-browed brushfinch (Arremon torquatus) is a species of bird in the family Passerellidae, the New World sparrows. It is found in Argentina, Bolivia, and Peru.

== Taxonomy and systematics ==
The white-browed brushfinch has a complicated taxonomic history. It was formally described in 1837 with the binomial Embernagra torquata. It was later reassigned to genus Buarremon which was still later merged into genus Atlapetes. Further study resulted in Buarremon's being resurrected. The species Buarremon torquatus was called the "stripe-headed brushfinch". In 2008, taxonomists began merging Buarremon into Arremon; by that time the "stripe-headed brushfinch" had acquired multiple subspecies. Following a study published in 2010 and some earlier studies, taxonomists began splitting the "stripe-headed brushfinch" into eight species. The nominate subspecies A. torquatus, now with three subspecies, was renamed the white-browed brushfinch.

The white-browed brushfinch has three subspecies, the nominate A. t. torquatus (Lafresnaye & d'Orbigny, 1837), A. t. fimbriatus (Chapman, 1923), and A. t. borellii (Salvadori, 1897).

== Description ==
The white-browed brushfinch is about 19 cm (7.5 in) long and weighs 30 to 36 g (1.1 to 1.3 oz). The sexes have the same plumage. Adults of the nominate subspecies have a black crown with a gray stripe in the middle. They have black lores and blackish ear coverts. A stripe of white that begins over the lores and continues as a supercilium to the nape gives the species its eponymous white brow. Their upperparts, wings, and tail are olive. Their throat is white with a black band below it. Their breast and belly are whitish or pale gray and their flanks are gray with an olive tinge. Juveniles have a sootier head than adults, no black chest band, a pale gray breast, and a buff belly. Subspecies A. t. fimbriatus is similar to the nominate but its white facial stripe begins further to the rear. A. t. borellii is like finbriatus but without the black chest band. All subspecies have a dark brown iris, a blackish bill, and pinkish brown to grayish legs and feet.

== Distribution and habitat ==
The nominate subspecies of the white-browed brushfinch is the northernmost. It is found from Puno Department in far southeastern Peru into western Bolivia as far as western Cochabamba Department. Subspecies A. t. fimbriatus is found in Bolivia in eastern Cochabamba, western Santa Cruz, and Chuquisaca departments. A. t. borellii is found from Chuquisaca and Tarija departments in southern Bolivia south into northwestern Argentina's Jujuy and Salta provinces. The species primarily inhabits the understory and edges of montane evergreen forest both primary and secondary, and to a lesser extent elfin forest. The nominate subspecies ranges in elevation from 1,650 to 3,100 m (5,400 to 10,200 ft) and the other two subspecies from 400 to 1,200 m (1,300 to 3,900 ft).

== Behavior ==
=== Movement ===
The white-browed brushfinch is a year-round resident though some elevational movements are suspected in Argentina.

=== Feeding ===
The white-browed brushfinch's diet has not been studied but is known to include insects, seeds, and fruit. It forages singly and in pairs. It forages on the ground or in low vegetation, flipping leaf litter with its bill.

=== Breeding ===
The white-browed brushfinch's breeding season overall spans from October to February with some latitudinal variation. The species' nest is an open cup made from plant material and is typically placed in vegetation between about 2 and 8 m (7 and 26 ft) above the ground. The usual clutch is two white to pale blue eggs. The female alone incubates, for about 16 days. Fledging occurs about 13 days after hatch and both parents provision nestlings.

=== Vocalization ===
The white-browed brushfinch's song is "a series of high-pitched whistles lasting ca 3 s, e.g. pze-zee-psee zaa sweee". It also sometimes sings a longer and more complex song. The species' call is "a short and sharp note".

== Status ==
The IUCN has assessed the white-browed brushfinch as being of Least Concern. Its population size is not known and is believed to be decreasing. No immediate threats have been identified.
