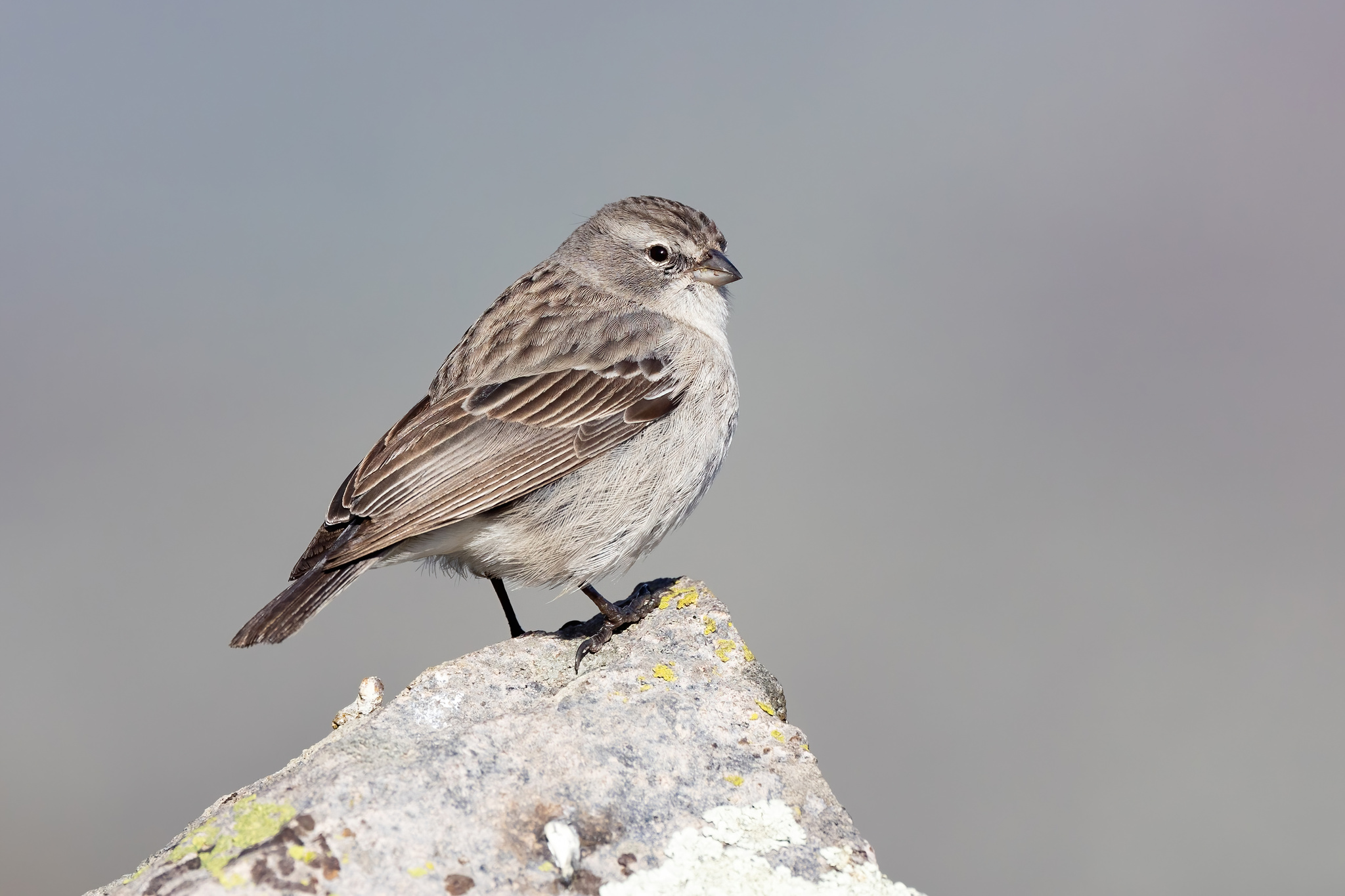

Conservation status
- Least Concern (IUCN 3.1)

Scientific classification
- Kingdom: Animalia
- Phylum: Chordata
- Class: Aves
- Order: Passeriformes
- Family: Thraupidae
- Genus: Geospizopsis
- Species: G. plebejus

Binomial name
- Geospizopsis plebejus (Tschudi, 1844)

Synonyms
- Phrygilus plebejus

= Ash-breasted sierra finch =

Species of bird

The ash-breasted sierra finch (Geospizopsis plebejus) is a species of bird in the family Thraupidae. It is found in Argentina, Bolivia, Chile, Ecuador, and Peru. Its natural habitats are subtropical or tropical dry shrubland, subtropical or tropical high-altitude shrubland, and subtropical or tropical high-altitude grassland.

== Taxonomy ==
The ash-breasted sierra finch was formally described by the Swiss naturalist Johann Jakob von Tschudi in 1844 as Phrygilus plebejus. Tschudi did not give a type locality in his description, but the Austrian ornithologist Carl Hellmayr contended in 1938 that the type specimens were probably collected from the Junín highlands of Peru. The subspecies ocularis was described by P. L. Sclater in 1859 based on specimens collected from Cuenca, Ecuador. Sclater initially described ocularis as a distinct species, but it was subsequently lumped as a subspecies of plebejus. naroskyi was described in 1983 by Manuel Nores and Dario Yzurieta based on an adult male collected from Pampa de Achala in the Sierras de Córdoba of Argentina.

The generic name Geospizopsis is derived from the name of the genus Geospiza, meaning 'ground finch' in Ancient Greek, and the Greek word opsis, meaning 'appearance'. The specific name plebejus is from the Modern Latin word plebeius, meaning 'common' or 'ordinary'. Ash-breasted sierra finch is the official common name designated by AviList. In Spanish, the species is known as Yal Plebeyo in Spain, Yal Chico in Argentina, Plebeyo in Chile, Frigilo Pechicinéreo in Ecuador, and Fringilo de Pecho Cenizo in Peru.

The ash-breasted sierra finch currently has three subspecies recognized by AviList, which differ in their size and coloration.

- G. p. plebejus (Tschudi, 1844): The nominate subspecies, it is found in the Andes of Ecuador and northern Peru north of the Marañón Valley, in the regions of Tumbes and Piura.
- G. p. ocularis (Sclater, 1859): (Note: The subspecific epithet ocularis is derived from the Latin word ocularis, meaning 'of the eyes'.) Inhabits in the Andes from Peru south of the Marañón Valley and western Bolivia south to Antofagasta in Chile and northwestern and west-central Argentina, as far as Mendoza. It is the smallest subspecies, with a more grayish coloration and less heavily-streaked upperparts.
- G. p. naroskyi (Nores and Yzurieta, 1983): Found in the Sierras de Córdoba of north-central Argentina. Smaller than the nominate subspecies, with a more grayish and less brownish coloration, considerably darker flanks, and a blackish tail and wings.

== Description ==
A small sierra-finch with a short tail, measuring 11–11.5 cm (4.3–4.5 in) in length and weighing 13–17.4 g (0.46–0.61 oz).

== Distribution and habitat ==
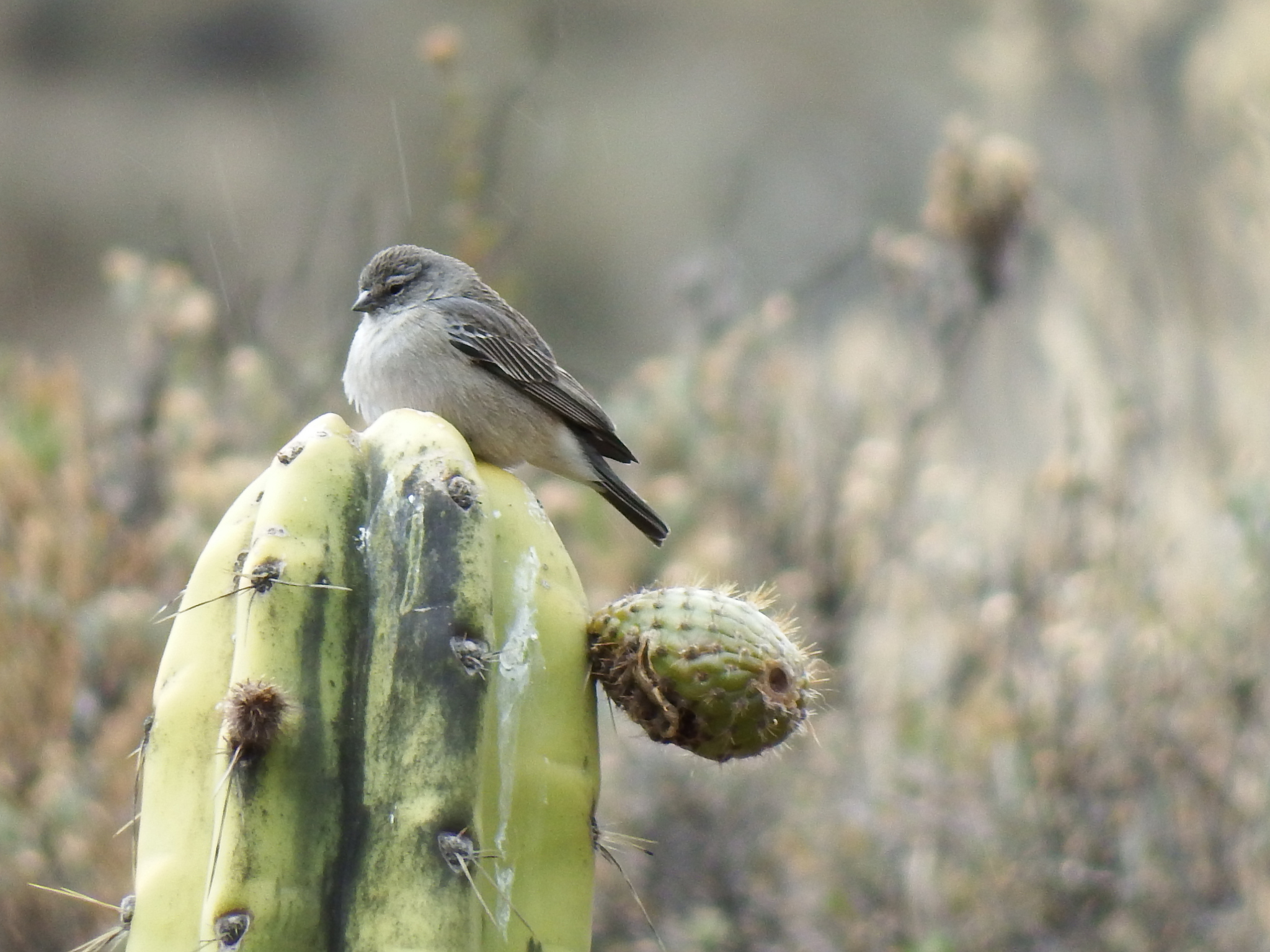
on cactus

The ash-breasted sierra finch is mainly a highland species, being found in open habitats in the high Andes at elevations of 2,500–5,000 m (8,200–16,400 ft), although a lowland population inhabiting the Tumbes area in southern Ecuador and far northwestern Peru is known to range down almost to sea level. The species has a large range along the Andes from Ecuador south through Peru, Chile, and Bolivia to Argentina, although it is not distributed as widely as the closely related plumbeous sierra finch. The ash-breasted sierra finch inhabits a variety of habitats, including flat dry puna grasslands, open woodlands, forest edge, the boundaries of bofedal wetlands with cushion plants, deserts, rocky slopes, and cactus-dominated slopes. In northern Chile, it is also known from Polylepis rugulosa forests and P. tarapacana forests at elevations of more than 4,000 m (13,000 ft). However, it prefers habitats with little vegetation and is quite tolerant of arid and human-modified habitats like villages and overgrazed pastures.

== Ecology and behavior ==
=== Diet ===
Eats mainly seeds, supplementing its diet with arthropods. Foraging takes place in small mixed flocks, which occasionally include the greenish yellow-finch.

=== Breeding ===
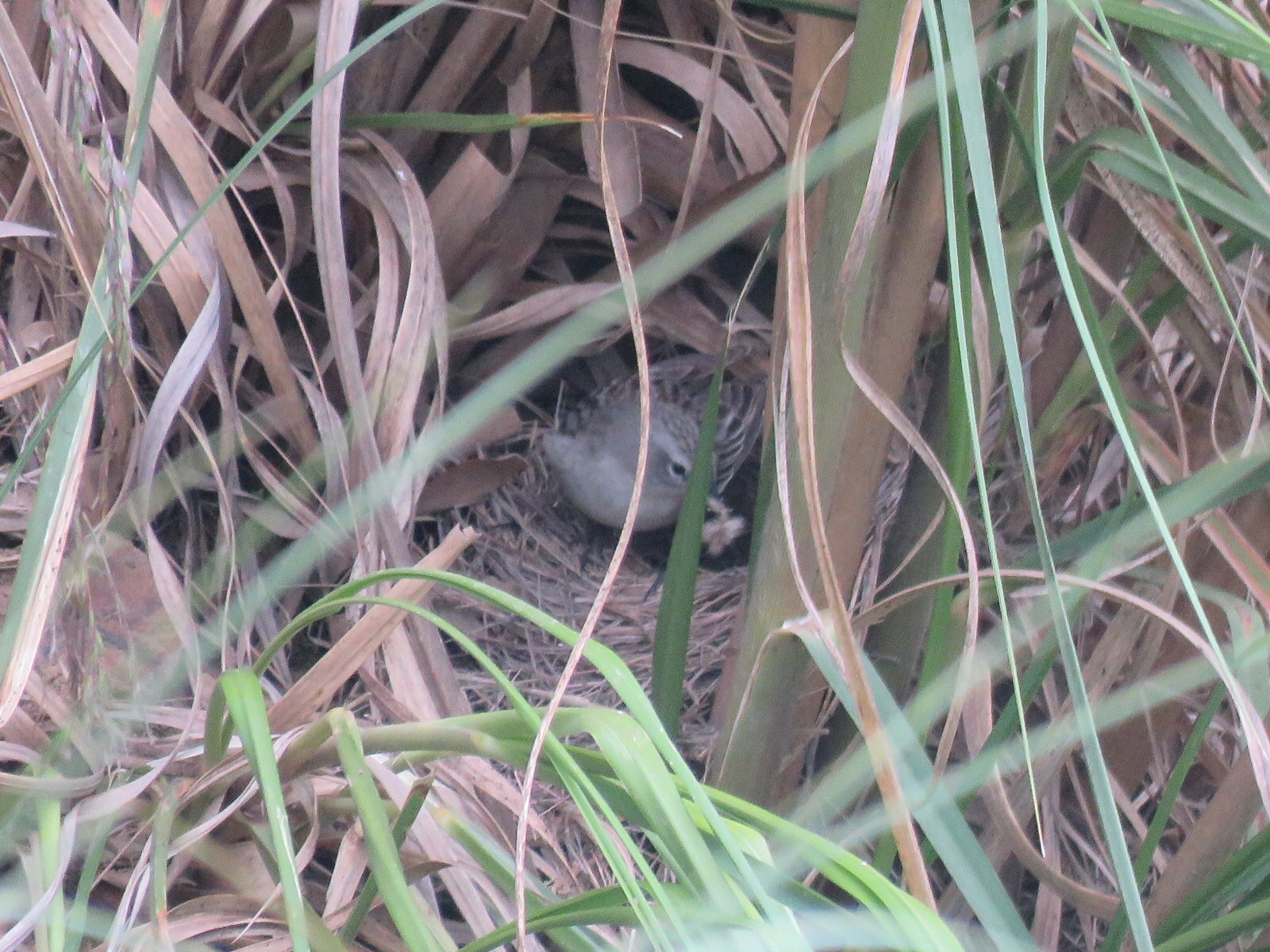
at nest

The breeding season lasts from October–July, varying throughout the range in accordance with the end of the dry season. In northern Chile it lasts from October to November, in October in Bolivia, from June to July in southern Peru, and from March to April in Cuzco. The nest is a bulky structure made out of grass, hair, wool and feathers. Nests are generally located in crevices, under the eaves of houses, under large rocks, or sometimes on small bushes or grass clumps 20–30 cm (7.9–11.8 in) above the ground. Females lay two pale blue-green eggs with dark brown spots, densest at the larger end.

== Conservation ==
The ash-breasted sierra finch is rather common, although somewhat patchily distributed, throughout the entirety of its large range, and does not show any signs of population decline. Consequently, it is listed as being of least concern on the IUCN Red List. The finch does not face any known threats and occurs in several protected areas, including Lauca National Park and Las Vicuñas National Reserve in Chile.
