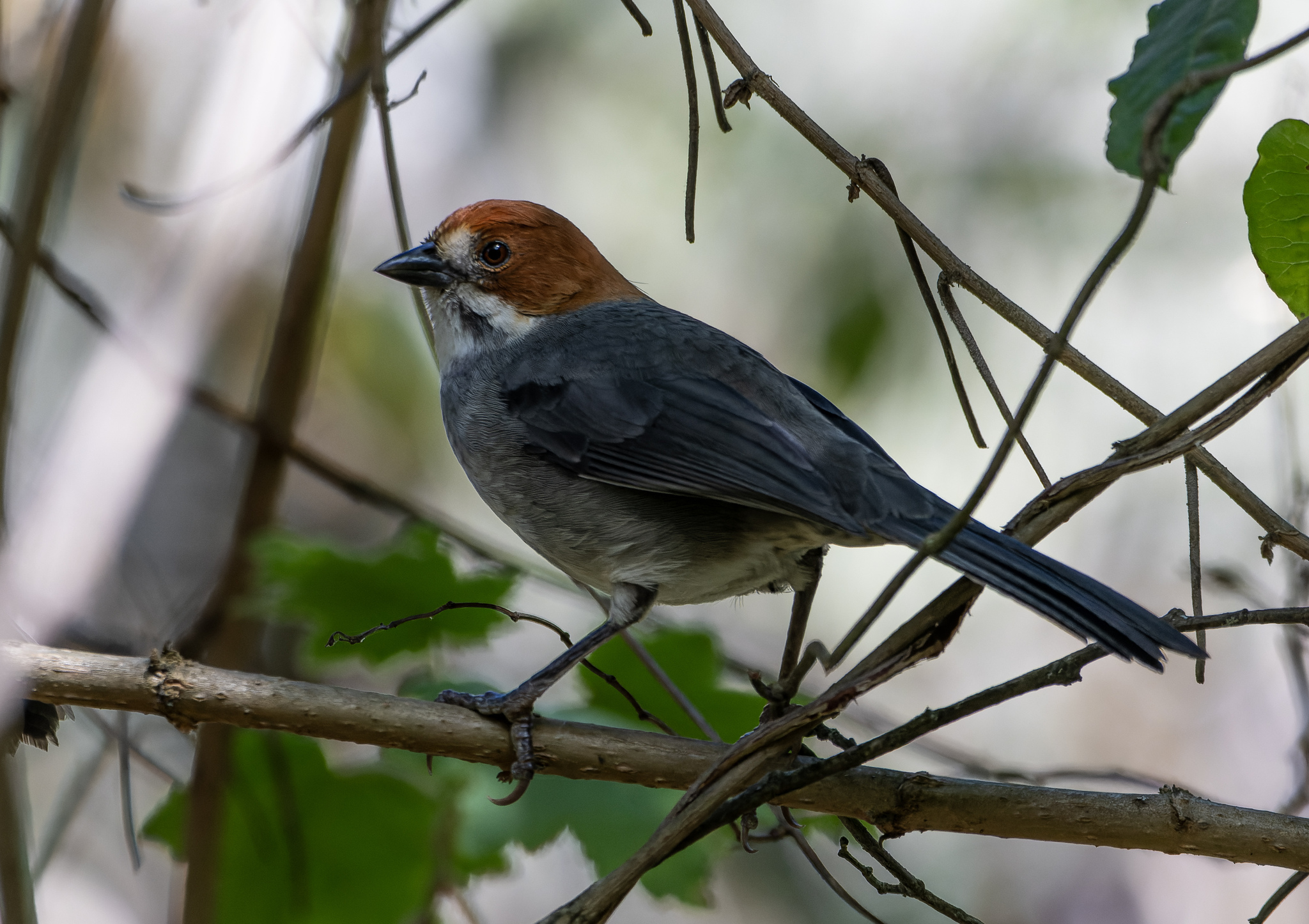

Conservation status
- Least Concern (IUCN 3.1)

Scientific classification
- Kingdom: Animalia
- Phylum: Chordata
- Class: Aves
- Order: Passeriformes
- Family: Passerellidae
- Genus: Atlapetes
- Species: A. rufigenis

Binomial name
- Atlapetes rufigenis (Salvin, 1895)

= Rufous-eared brushfinch =

Species of bird

The rufous-eared brushfinch (Atlapetes rufigenis) is a species of bird in the family Passerellidae, the New World sparrows. It is endemic to Peru.

== Taxonomy and systematics ==
The rufous-eared brushfinch was formally described in 1895 with the binomial Buarremon rufigenis. In the early twentieth century genus Buarremon was merged into Atlapetes.

The rufous-eared brushfinch is monotypic. However, some late twentieth century authors suggested that the Apurimac brushfinch (A. forbesi) should be a subspecies of it but they are not closely related.

== Description ==
The rufous-eared brushfinch is 17.5 to 19 cm (6.9 to 7.5 in) long; one male weighed 44 g (1.6 oz). The sexes have the same plumage. Adults have a mostly rufous head with white lores and the area above them. They have a wide white "moustache" below the rufous with a thin dusky gray stripe below it. Their upperparts, wings, and tail are dark smoky gray. Their throat is white, their breast and flanks grayish, and their belly and undertail coverts whitish. They have a brown iris, a black bill, and dark brown legs and feet. Juveniles have a dingy gray-brown head with the same white loral spots as adults. Their upperparts have a brown wash on the gray. Their breast and sides are dark brown.

== Distribution and habitat ==
The rufous-eared brushfinch is found in northern Peru on both slopes of the upper watershed of the Marañón River, from southern Cajamarca Department south to western Huánuco Department and in La Libertad Department. It also is found further west in the Cordillera Blanca in Ancash Department. It inhabits montane scrublands and Polylepis woodlands near treeline. In elevation it ranges between 3,200 and 4,600 m (10,500 and 15,100 ft).

== Behavior ==
=== Movement ===
The rufous-eared brushfinch is a year-round resident.

=== Feeding ===
The rufous-eared brushfinch's diet has not been studied but is known to include seeds and is assumed to also include insects. It usually forages in pairs, sometimes on the ground but more in the understory to mid-story. It does not join mixed-species feeding flocks.

=== Breeding ===
The rufous-eared brushfinch's breeding season appears to span at least February to June but nothing else is known about the species' breeding biology.

=== Vocalization ===
The rufous-eared brushfinch's song has not been described. When a pair is excited, they make a duet "mostly of low chatters and some high, lisping notes". The species' calls include "a high ti or tsi" note.

== Status ==
The IUCN originally in 2000 assessed the rufous-eared brushfinch as Near Threatened but since 2021 as being of Least Concern. Its population size is not known but is believed to be stable. "Cutting for firewood and a lack of regeneration caused by burning and intensive grazing are thought to be reducing mixed Polylepis woodlands. Other factors include the change from camelid to sheep and cattle farming, erosion and soil degradation caused by agricultural intensification, road construction and the inadequacy of afforestation projects (particularly the use of Eucalyptus and other exotic tree species)." The species is considered fairly common.
