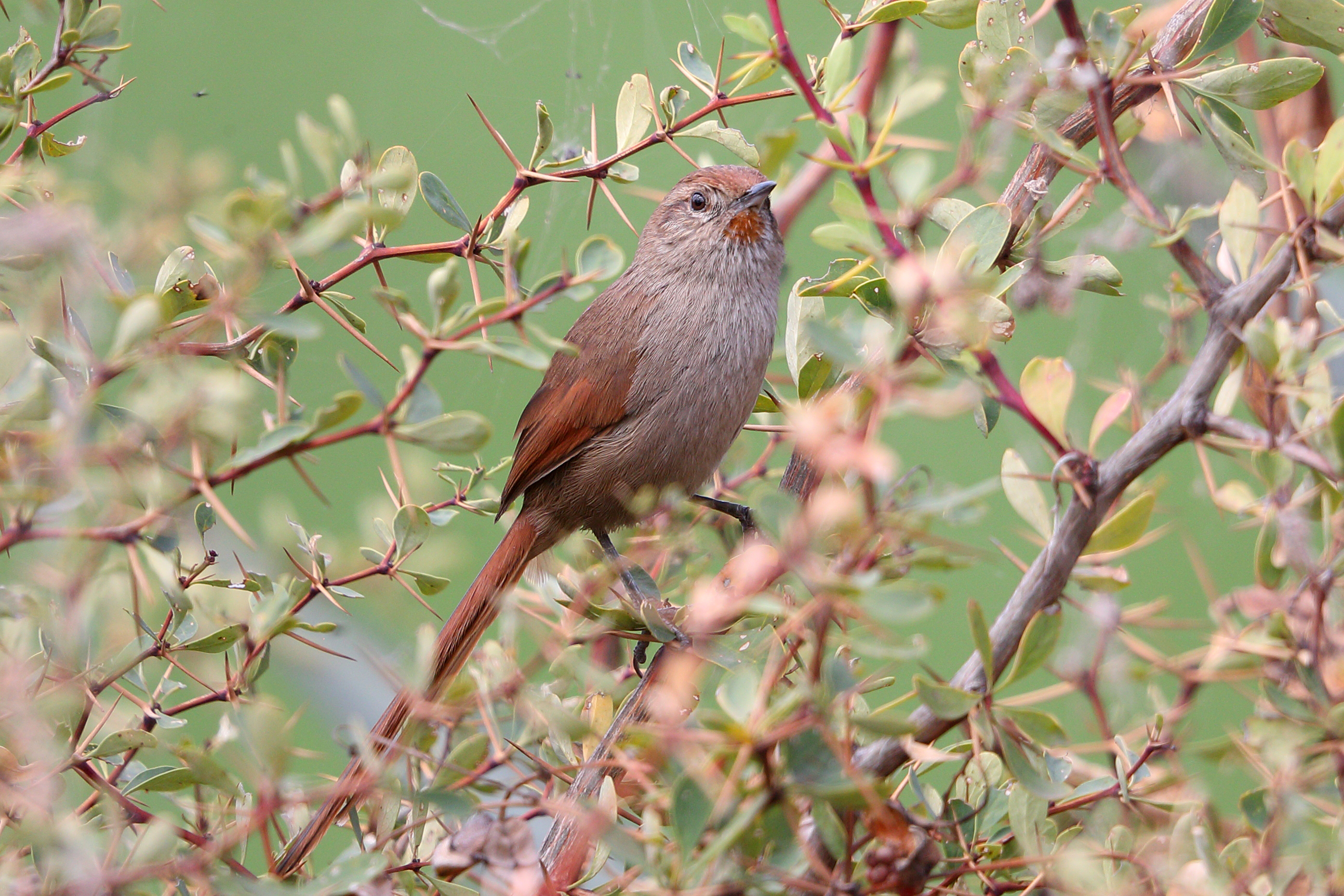

Conservation status
- Least Concern (IUCN 3.1)

Scientific classification
- Kingdom: Animalia
- Phylum: Chordata
- Class: Aves
- Order: Passeriformes
- Family: Furnariidae
- Genus: Asthenes
- Species: A. ottonis

Binomial name
- Asthenes ottonis (Berlepsch, 1901)

= Rusty-fronted canastero =

Species of bird

The rusty-fronted canastero (Asthenes ottonis) is a species of bird in the Furnariinae subfamily of the ovenbird family Furnariidae. It is endemic to Peru.

== Taxonomy and systematics ==
The rusty-fronted canastero is monotypic. At times it has variously been treated as a subspecies of the canyon canastero (A. pudibunda) and as a superspecies with it and the maquis canastero (A. heterura), but genetic data show it to be most closely related to the eye-ringed thistletail (A. palpebralis).

== Description ==
The rusty-fronted canastero is 18 to 19 cm (7.1 to 7.5 in) long and weighs about 13 g (0.46 oz). The sexes have the same plumage. Adults have a grayish buff supercilium and arc below the eye, a small dark line in front of the eye, and a dark brownish patch behind the eye on an otherwise dull brownish face with pale streaks. Their forehead ("front") is rufous with faint pale streaks. Their crown, back, and rump are rich brown and their uppertail coverts chestnut-rufous. Their wings are mostly rufous-chestnut with dark fuscous tips on the flight feathers. Their tail is rufous-chestnut; the inner three pairs of feathers are longer than the others and have dark fuscous shafts. Their chin and upper throat are light orange-rufous to chestnut-rufous, their lower throat pale grayish buff streaked with brownish gray, their breast slightly darker and streaked with pale buff, their belly buff-whitish, and their flanks and undertail coverts rufescent brown. Their iris is dark brown to brown, their maxilla dark horn to blackish, their mandible silvery to dark horn with a dark tip, and their legs and feet olive-gray to dark gray.

== Distribution and habitat ==
The rusty-fronted canastero is found in the Andes of south-central Peru's Huancavelica, Ayacucho, Apurímac, and Cuzco departments. It inhabits semi-humid to arid montane scrublands and the edge of Polylepis woodlands. In elevation it ranges between 2,750 and 4,000 m (9,000 and 13,100 ft).

== Behavior ==
=== Movement ===
The rusty-fronted canastero is a year-round resident throughout its range.

=== Feeding ===
The rusty-fronted canastero's diet and foraging behavior are not well known. It is usually seen singly or in pairs. It is thought to feed on arthropods gleaned from low vegetation and the ground.

=== Breeding ===
Nothing is known about the rusty-fronted canastero's breeding biology.

=== Vocalization ===
The rusty-fronted canastero's song is "3 high-pitched ascending notes followed by a rapidly descending series, 'bsee-bzéé-bzee-di-di-di-di-d-d-d' ". Its call has been described as "high-pitched 'veer' and nasal 'djeeh' ".

== Status ==
The IUCN has assessed the rusty-fronted canastero as being of Least Concern. It has a somewhat limited range and an unknown population size that is believed to be stable. No immediate threats have been identified. It is poorly known but thought to be fairly common. It occurs in at least one protected area.
