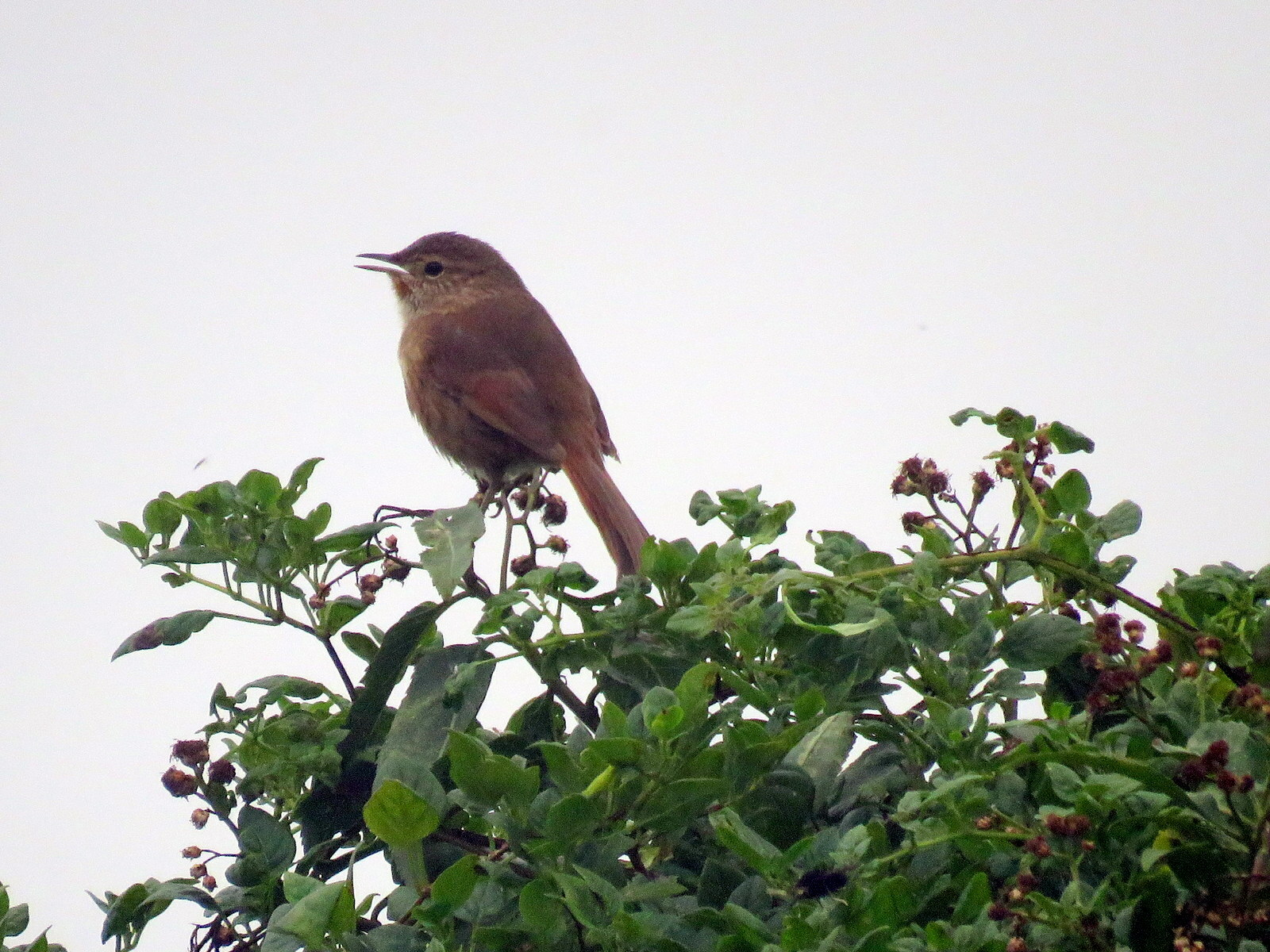

Conservation status
- Least Concern (IUCN 3.1)

Scientific classification
- Kingdom: Animalia
- Phylum: Chordata
- Class: Aves
- Order: Passeriformes
- Family: Furnariidae
- Genus: Asthenes
- Species: A. heterura

Binomial name
- Asthenes heterura (Berlepsch, 1901)

= Maquis canastero =

Species of bird

The maquis canastero (Asthenes heterura) is a species of bird in the Furnariinae subfamily of the ovenbird family Furnariidae. It is found in Argentina and Bolivia.

== Taxonomy and systematics ==
The maquis canastero is monotypic. At times it has variously been treated as a subspecies of the canyon canastero (A. pudibunda), as conspecific with the rusty-fronted canastero (A. ottonis), and as a superspecies with the two of them. However, it might be most closely related to the very similar sharp-billed canastero (A. pyrrholeuca).

== Description ==
The maquis canastero is 16 to 17 cm (6.3 to 6.7 in) long and weighs 13 to 14 g (0.46 to 0.49 oz). The sexes have the same plumage. Adults have a buff supercilium and eyering on an otherwise light brownish face. Their crown, back, and rump are rich brown and their uppertail coverts chestnut. Their wings are mostly rufous with dark fuscous tips on the flight feathers. Their tail's inner two pairs of feathers are longer than the others and dusky rufous; the rest are chestnut-rufous and progressively shorter. Their chin and upper throat are pale orange-rufous, their breast and belly grayish buff with browner sides, and their flanks and undertail coverts tawny ochraceous. Their iris is brown, their maxilla black, their mandible pinkish with a black tip, and their legs and feet dark gray to dark olive-gray.

== Distribution and habitat ==
The maquis canastero is a bird of the east side of the Andes, though sources differ on the extent of its range. According to the International Ornithological Committee (IOC) and the Cornell Lab of Ornithology, it is present in Bolivia and Argentina. It has an apparently disjunct distribution and it may also be present between the two known populations. One population is found in the northern Bolivian departments of La Paz and Cochabamba. The other is found in the northwestern Argentinian provinces of Jujuy, Salta, and Tucumán. There are sight records from the Bolivian departments between the two areas. In contrast, the Clements taxonomy lists only the northern Bolivian range.

The maquis canstero inhabits a variety of semi-humid to arid landscapes including montane scrublands, scrublands with open woodland of Alnus and Polylepis, montane Festuca grasslands with scattered bushes, and agricultural areas with bushes and hedgerows. In elevation it mostly ranges between 3,000 and 4,200 m (9,800 and 13,800 ft) though it locally occurs as low as 2,500 m (8,200 ft).

== Behavior ==
=== Movement ===
The maquis canastero is a year-round resident throughout its range.

=== Feeding ===
The maquis canastero feeds on arthropods. It typically forages singly or in pairs though it occasionally joins mixed-species feeding flocks. It gleans its prey from the ground and possibly from low vegetation as well.

=== Breeding ===
Nothing is known about the maquis canastero's breeding biology.

=== Vocalization ===
The maquis canastero's song is "a fast, accelerating series of squeaky notes". It also sings a longer "series of high, squeaky, strained notes, variable in length, accelerating and descending". Its apparent call is a "monotonic trill...'tuírrrr' ".

== Status ==
The IUCN originally assessed the maquis canastero as Vulnerable, then in 2004 as Threatened, and since 2020 as being of Least Concern. It has a large range and an estimated population of between 10,000 and 20,000 mature individuals; the latter is believed to be decreasing. The principal threat is destruction of Polylepis woodlands for timber, firewood, and conversion to agriculture and grazing. "The species nevertheless appears to tolerate at least moderate habitat degradation and is present on cattle pastures and on cultivated land." It is considered fairly common to uncommon but "probably overlooked".
