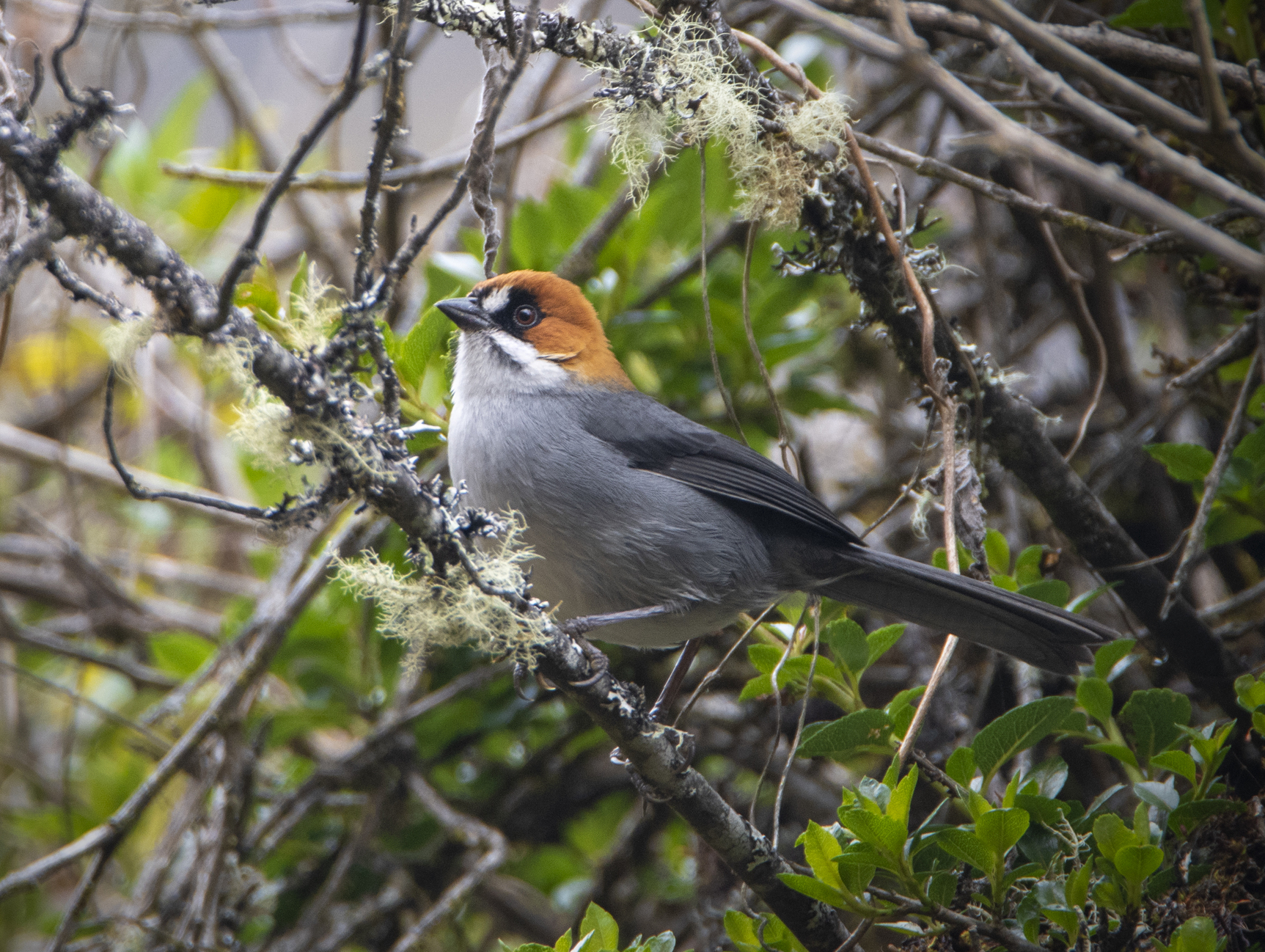

Conservation status
- Least Concern (IUCN 3.1)

Scientific classification
- Kingdom: Animalia
- Phylum: Chordata
- Class: Aves
- Order: Passeriformes
- Family: Passerellidae
- Genus: Atlapetes
- Species: A. forbesi

Binomial name
- Atlapetes forbesi Morrison, 1947

= Apurímac brushfinch =

Apurimac brushfinch

Species of bird

The Apurimac brushfinch (Note: The IOC and other taxonomic systems spell the English name with no diacritics. The IOC is the Wikipedia standard for bird names.) (Atlapetes forbesi) is a species of bird in the family Passerellidae, the New World sparrows. It is endemic to Peru.

== Taxonomy and systematics ==
The Apurimac brushfinch was formally described by Alastair Morrison in 1947 as a subspecies of the rufous-eared brushfinch with the trinomial Atlapetes rufigenis forbesi. The specific epithet honors Sir Courtenay Forbes, a former British ambassador to Peru, who aided Morrison during his travels in the country. The species' English name comes from the Department of Apurimac, where the type specimen was collected. It was recognized as a full species, and not closely related to the rufous-eared brushfinch, early in the twenty-first century.

The Apurimac brushfinch is monotypic.

== Description ==
The Apurimac brushfinch is 18 to 19 cm (7.1 to 7.5 in) long and weighs about 40 to 43 g (1.4 to 1.5 oz). The sexes have the same plumage. Adults have a mostly rufous head and nape with a black forehead, lores, and area around the eye. They have a white patch above the lores and a white lower cheek with a thin black line below it. Their upperparts are gray; their wings and tail are slightly more blackish with white showing on the bend of the folded wing. Their throat is white and their underparts mostly gray with a whitish center to the belly. They have a brown iris, a long blackish bill, and dark grayish legs and feet. Juveniles have a mostly brownish face and upperparts, a whitish throat, and a mottled brown breast and flanks.

== Distribution and habitat ==
The Apurimac brushfinch is found in south-central Peru from far east-central Ayacucho Department east through much of Apurimac Department slightly into west-central Cuzco Department. It inhabits montane scrublands and Polylepis woodlands in the intermontane valleys. One source states it ranges in elevation between 2,700 and 4,100 m (8,900 and 13,500 ft) and another says between 2,700 and 4,600 m (8,900 and 15,100 ft).

== Behavior ==
=== Movement ===
The Apurimac brushfinch is a year-round resident.

=== Feeding ===
The Apurimac brushfinch's diet has not been studied. It forages on the ground or slightly above it in vegetation.

=== Breeding ===
The Apurimac brushfinch's breeding season has not been defined but spans at least from March to May. Nothing else is known about the species' breeding biology.

=== Vocalization ===
The Apurimac brushfinch's song is "a hesitant series of thin whistles and slow trills, for example: tchip TSEEW! tchi pi-pi". Excited pairs duet with "high musical chatters ending with ti'ti'ti'ti tooee tooee tooee tooee". The species' call is "high pi notes".

== Status ==
The IUCN has assessed the Apurimac brushfinch as being of Least Concern. It has a restricted range; its population size is not known and is believed to be decreasing. "Deforestation is a threat, as Podocarpus trees continue to be cut on the Nevada Ampay in Apurímac, north of Abancay...The Podocarpus forest in the Nevada Ampay is protected as the Ampay National Sanctuary, and reforestation is underway, but threats to the forest are yet to be alleviated." It is considered "fairly common" or "locally common".
