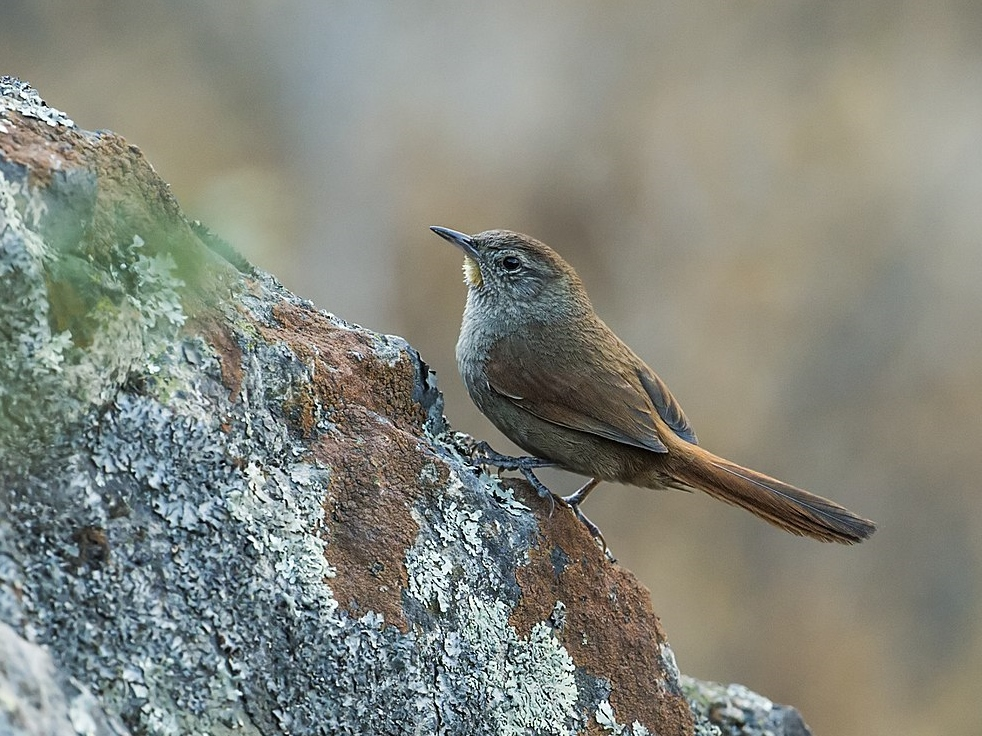

Conservation status
- Least Concern (IUCN 3.1)

Scientific classification
- Kingdom: Animalia
- Phylum: Chordata
- Class: Aves
- Order: Passeriformes
- Family: Furnariidae
- Genus: Asthenes
- Species: A. pudibunda

Binomial name
- Asthenes pudibunda (Sclater, PL, 1874)

Subspecies
- See text

= Canyon canastero =

Species of bird

The canyon canastero (Asthenes pudibunda) is a species of bird in the Furnariinae subfamily of the ovenbird family Furnariidae. It is found in Peru and far-northern Chile.

== Taxonomy and systematics ==
The canyon canastero has three subspecies, the nominate A. p. pudibunda (Sclater, 1874), A. p. neglecta (Cory, 1916), and A. p. grisior (Koepcke, M., 1961). Some authors have treated the rusty-fronted canastero (A. ottonis) and maquis canastero (A. heterura) as subspecies of the canyon canastero and others have treated the three as a superspecies. However, genetic data show that the canyon canastero is most closely related to the Vilcabamba thistletail (A. vilcabambae).

== Description ==
The canyon canastero is 15 to 17 cm (5.9 to 6.7 in) long and weighs 13 to 17 g (0.46 to 0.60 oz). The sexes have the same plumage. Adults of the nominate subspecies have a thin buff supercilium and dark brownish lores on an otherwise gray-brown face. Their crown is warm dark brown and their back and rump a slightly paler brown. Their wings are dull reddish brown. Their uppertail coverts are chestnut-rufous and their tail a more rufous brown than the back. Their chin and upper throat are pale tawny-orange, their lower throat and upper breast light gray-brown with faint paler streaks, their lower breast and belly unstreaked pale gray-brown, and their flanks and undertail coverts dull rufescent brown. Their iris is brown, their maxilla black to dark horn, their mandible gray to pinkish horn with a blackish tip, and their legs and feet gray to blackish. Juveniles' chin and throat are light gray-brown, their breast has faint dark bars, and their underparts have a brownish wash. Subspecies A. p. neglecta has a darker back than the nominate, a more chestnut chin and throat, and darker and browner underparts. A. p. grisior is paler than the nominate with slightly grayer underparts and slightly less rufescent flanks.

== Distribution and habitat ==
The canyon canastero is a bird of the western slope of the Andes. Subspecies A. p. neglecta is the northernmost; it is found in the northwestern Peruvian departments of La Libertad and Ancash. The nominate subspecies is found in the western Peruvian Department of Lima. A. p. grisior is found from the Department of Huancavelica in southwestern Peru south into Chile as far as the Tarapacá Region. The species primarily inhabits rocky areas in arid montane scrublands, often in ravines, and occasionally occurs in Polylepis woodland. In elevation it mostly ranges between 2,400 and 3,700 m (7,900 and 12,100 ft) but is found as high as 4,000 m (13,000 ft).

== Behavior ==
=== Movement ===
The canyon canastero is a year-round resident throughout its range.

=== Feeding ===
The canyon canastero feeds on arthropods. It usually forages singly or in pairs, gleaning prey from low branches and the ground, usually in areas shaded by rocks or bushes.

=== Breeding ===
The canyon canastero's breeding season has not been definded but includes May. Nothing else is known about its breeding biology.

=== Vocalization ===
The canyon canastero's song is "a loud, accelerating trill with a few introductory notes". Its call is a repeated "kee-whit".

== Status ==
The IUCN has assessed the canyon canastero as being of Least Concern. It has a fairly large range and an unknown population size that is believed to be decreasing. No immediate threats have been identified. It is considered uncommon to fairly common. "Much of its habitat is subject to at least moderate grazing."
