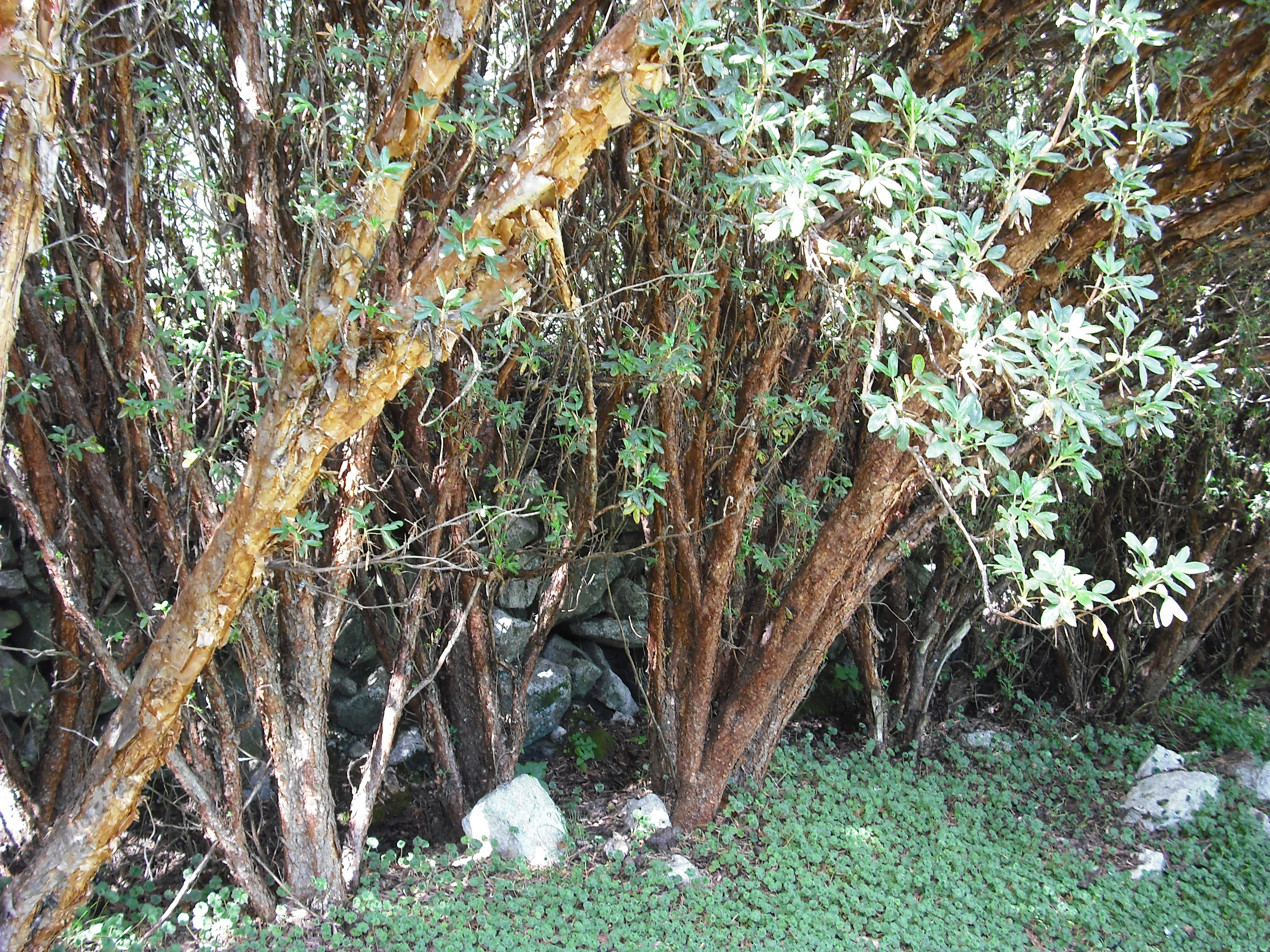

Conservation status
- Vulnerable (IUCN 2.3)

Scientific classification
- Kingdom: Plantae
- Clade: Tracheophytes
- Clade: Angiosperms
- Clade: Eudicots
- Clade: Rosids
- Order: Rosales
- Family: Rosaceae
- Genus: Polylepis
- Species: P. racemosa

Binomial name
- Polylepis racemosa Ruiz & Pav.

Synonyms
- Polylepis incana var. connectens Bitter; Polylepis incana subsp. icosandra Bitter; Polylepis incana subsp. micranthera Bitter; Polylepis incana var. primovestita Bitter; Polylepis villosa Kunth; Quinasis villosa (Kunth) Raf.

= Polylepis racemosa =

Species of tree

Polylepis racemosa is a species of small tree in the family Rosaceae. It is endemic to Peru, Bolivia, and Ecuador. It is threatened by habitat destruction. The International Union for Conservation of Nature has assessed the conservation status of this tree as "vulnerable".

== Distribution and habitat ==
Polylepis racemosa is endemic to high altitudes in the Andes of Peru, Bolivia and Ecuador. It is very typical of the flora of the western Andes in southern Peru where it grows at altitudes of up to 14,625 ft (4,500 m). South of Lake Titicaca in Bolivia, it is restricted to the region around Araca. The region is known as the "Suni" meaning high and consists of long, narrow, steep-sided valleys and intervening undulating flatter areas.

== Ecology ==
This species is fast growing, and is more ecological and adapts better than other species of the genus. It is a promising candidate for reforestation and agroforestry. This region is cold in the winter but has a dry climate; the herbage consists of various grasses and herbaceous plants, the wild potatoes Solanum acaule and Solanum bukasovii, and the woody shrubs P. racemosa, Mutisia acuminata, Baccharis sp., and Cantua buxifolia, which is the national flower of Peru. In Ecuador it has been introduced from Peru, and this may be detrimental because it hybridises readily with the local species of Polylepis, of which there are eight, including the endemic species Polylepis lanuginosa. The Polyepsis forest plays an important role in the ecosystem of the region, acting as a sponge to retain moisture.

== Uses ==
The Aymara people, the indigenous people of this region, call the tree "queñua" and use the timber for fuel, for roofing their huts and for making charcoal.

== Status ==
Polylepis racemosa has a somewhat restricted range and specific habitat requirements. It is under threat from reduction in its habitat as trees are cut and used for fuel and building materials. The area is also subject to burning, and the International Union for Conservation of Nature has assessed the conservation status of this tree as "vulnerable".
