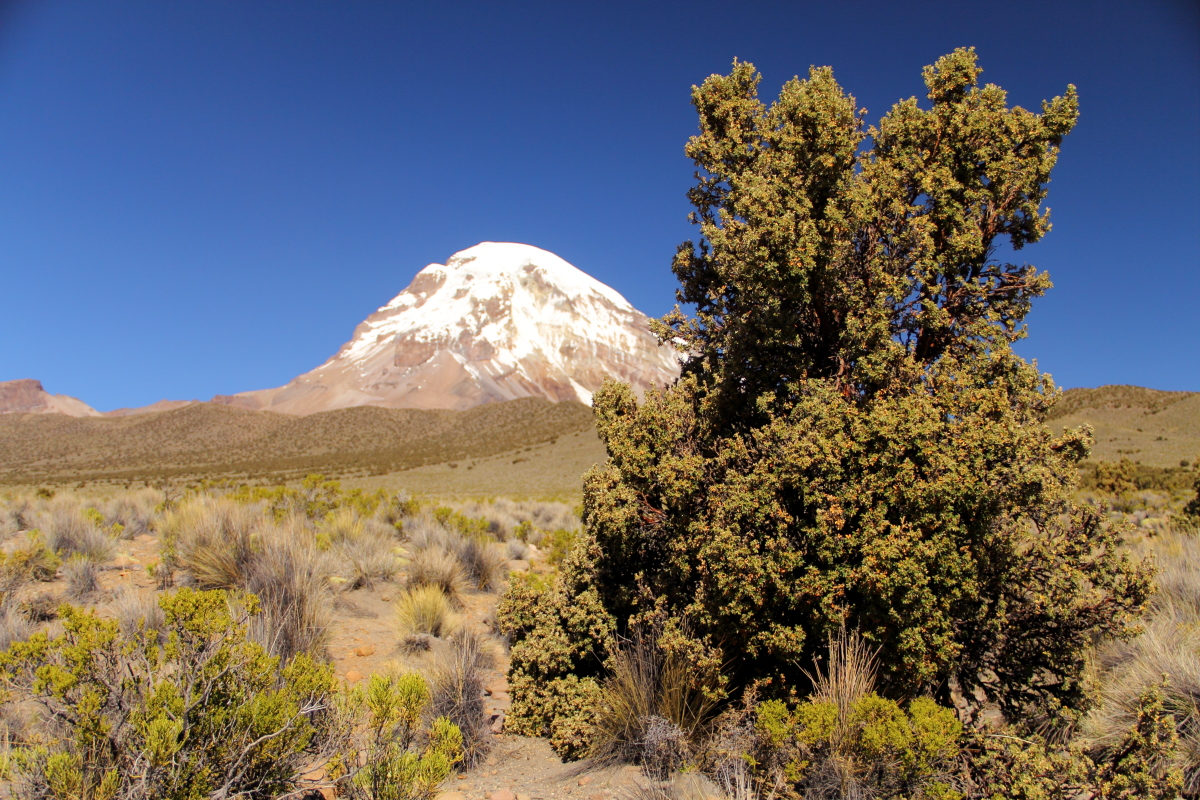
- At Nevado Sajama, Bolivia

Conservation status
- Near Threatened (IUCN 3.1)

Scientific classification
- Kingdom: Plantae
- Clade: Tracheophytes
- Clade: Angiosperms
- Clade: Eudicots
- Clade: Rosids
- Order: Rosales
- Family: Rosaceae
- Genus: Polylepis
- Species: P. tarapacana

Binomial name
- Polylepis tarapacana Phil.

Synonyms
- P. tarapacana var. brevifilamentosa; P. tarapacana var. multisquama; P. tarapacana var. pycnolopha; P. tarapacana var. sajamensis

= Polylepis tarapacana =

Tree species in the rose family

Polylepis tarapacana, known in its native habitat by the Spanish common name queñoa de altura ('polylepis or queñoa of [high] altitude'), is a short tree or shrub which is found in small, scattered groupings along the mountainous borders of Argentina, Bolivia, Chile, and Peru (Western Cordillera). A part of the rose family, it grows at altitudes of 3,400–5,013 meters (11,200–16,400 ft).

== Description ==
Polylepis tarapacana is a woody tree or shrub with multiple trunks that only rarely grows taller than 5 meters (16 ft), with the tallest singled trunk individuals at lower elevations reaching about 7 m (23 ft). The trees get progressively smaller in higher locations, eventually becoming 1 m (3.3 ft) tall shrubs. In the middle of its elevation range the trunk of a tree can reach a diameter of 34 centimeters (13 in). The red, shiny bark continually peels away in many thin layers, and the branches are twisted, as with all species in the genus.

The compound leaves are evergreen, small, and rather thick to conserve moisture. Each one has three leaflets, one at the end and a pair to the side, that together have an obtrullate, reversed trowel shape. They are 1.3–1.7 centimeters long and 0.9–1.2 cm wide, with the individual leaflets 0.7–0.8 cm by 0.3–0.4 cm. The upper surface is rough in texture, but hairless, and are usually covered in a thin layer of yellowish resin-like material. The undersides are covered in dense, yellowish, felt-like hairs.

The flowers are very small, with a diameter of just 5.1–8.0 millimeters. Each has four egg-shaped, green sepals and nine to thirteen stamens. The flowers can be single or in pairs, hanging from the twig. The fruit has three or four flattened ridges with spines and is covered in hairs, 4.1–5.2 mm long and 3.1–7.2 mm wide.

== Taxonomy ==
In 1891 Rodolfo Amando Philippi described a new species in the Polylepis which he named Polylepis tarapacana. Along with the rest of its genus it is classified in the Rosaceae family. Four varieties were described by Friedrich August Georg Bitter in 1911, but they are not listed as accepted in Plants of the World Online. The species is most closely related to a group of five species in a subsection of Incanaee, Polylepis fjeldsaoi, Polylepis incana, Polylepis incanoides, Polylepis nana, and Polylepis tomentella.

== Range and habitat ==
Polylepis tarapacana is native to the Central Volcanic Zone in the western Andean cordillera in southern Peru, southwestern Bolivia, northern Chile, and nearby areas of Argentina. It grows at high elevations, only above 3,400 meters (11,200 ft), with the highest documented specimen found at 5,013 meters (16,447 ft), higher than any other species of tree. Reports of the species growing as high as 5,200 m (17,100 ft) have not been confirmed. It is most common at elevations of 4,820 m (15,810 ft) in Bolivia's Oruro Department, with the species becoming rare at higher elevations with individuals widely separated. The upper limit for the trees is similar to that of the Juniperus tibetica forests in Tibet at approximately 4,900 meters, with 3 meter tall trees found at 4,820 meters on Nevado Sajama. Night time temperatures during the dry season are frequently colder than −10 °C (14 °F), with the trees able to avoid injury down to about −20 °C (−4 °F).
