= P. neglecta =

P. neglecta may refer to:

- Polylepis neglecta, a plant species endemic to Bolivia
- Pterodroma neglecta, the Kermadec petrel, a seabird species found in Australia, Chile and Japan

== Synonyms ==
- Paludicola neglecta, a synonym for Physalaemus cuvieri, a frog species
- Pelias neglecta, a synonym for Vipera berus, a snake species

== See also ==
- Neglecta (disambiguation)
