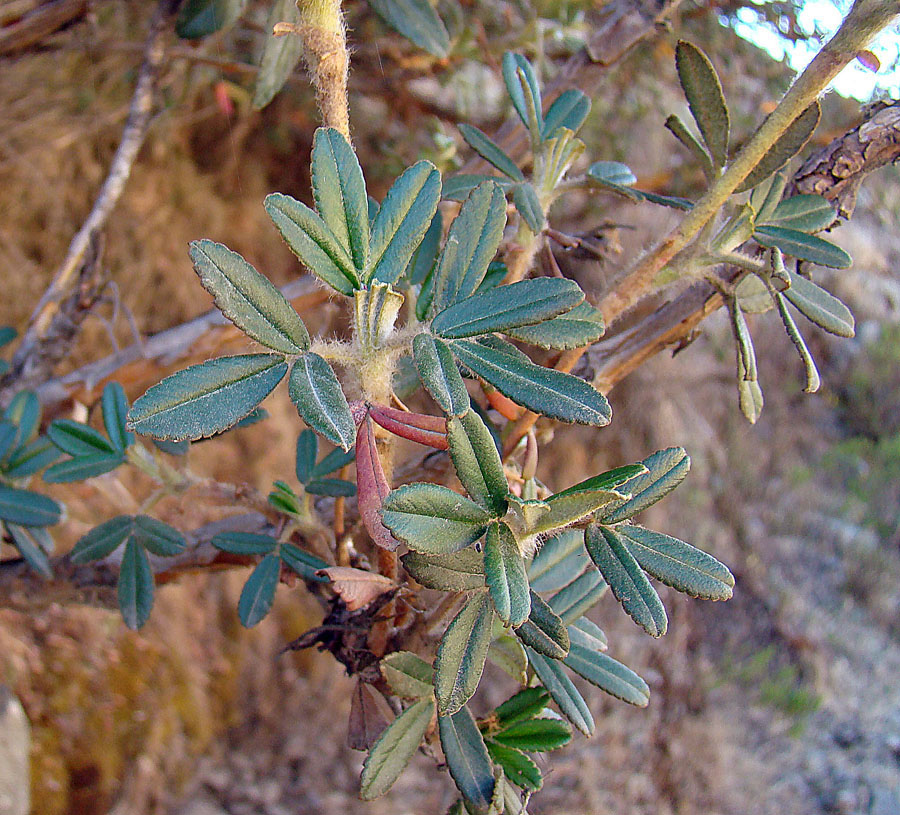

Scientific classification
- Kingdom: Plantae
- Clade: Tracheophytes
- Clade: Angiosperms
- Clade: Eudicots
- Clade: Rosids
- Order: Rosales
- Family: Rosaceae
- Genus: Polylepis
- Species: P. besseri

Binomial name
- Polylepis besseri Hieron. 1890

= Polylepis besseri =

Species of tree

Polylepis besseri is a species of plant in the family Rosaceae that is native to Bolivia and Peru.
