= Polylepis reticulata =

Conservation status
- Vulnerable (IUCN 3.1)

Scientific classification
- Kingdom: Plantae
- Clade: Tracheophytes
- Clade: Angiosperms
- Clade: Eudicots
- Clade: Rosids
- Order: Rosales
- Family: Rosaceae
- Genus: Polylepis
- Species: P. reticulata

Binomial name
- Polylepis reticulata Hieron

Species of flowering plant

Polylepis reticulata is a species of plant in the family Rosaceae. It is endemic to Ecuador.
