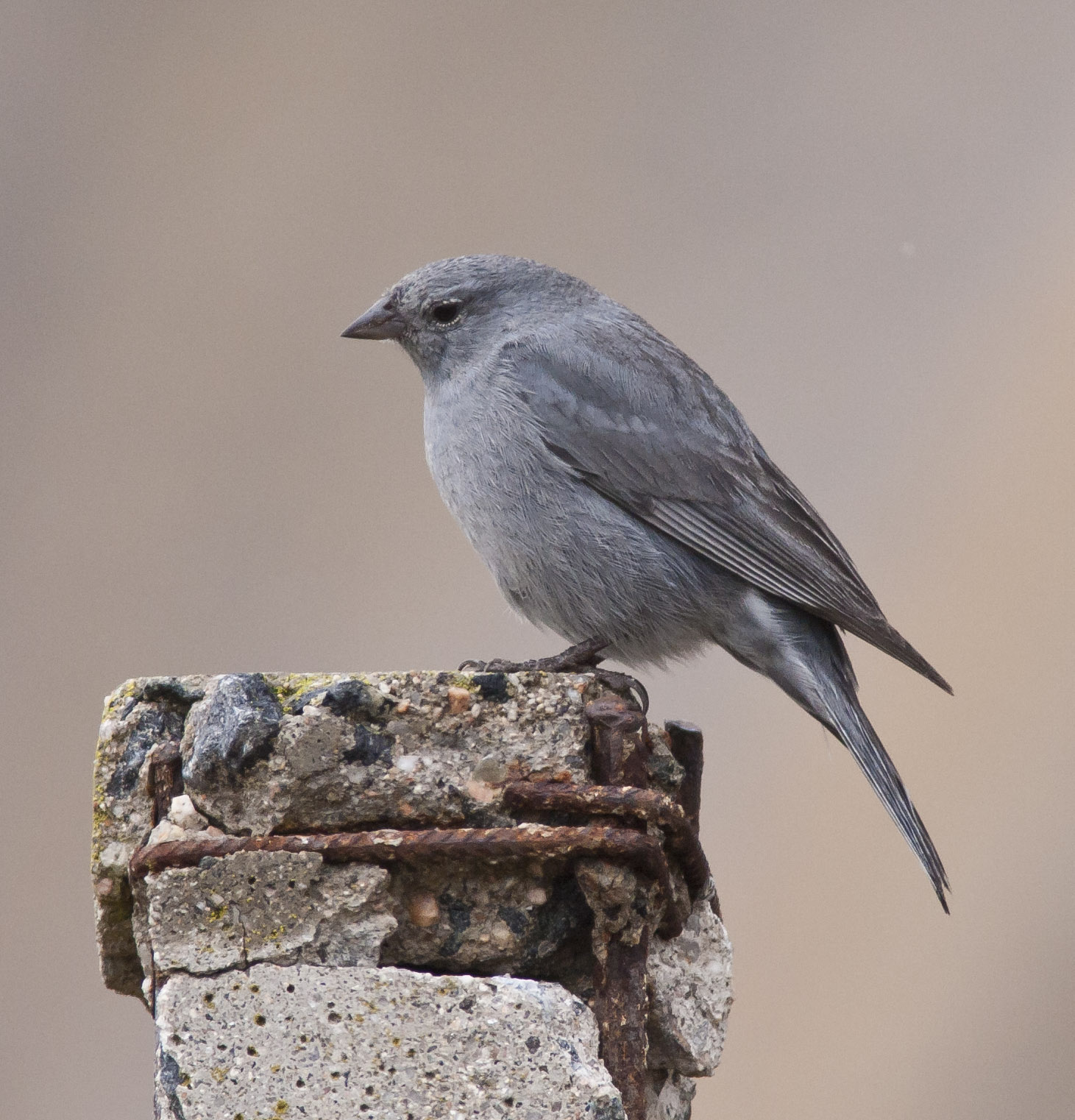
- Plumbeous sierra finch (Geospizopsis unicolor)

Scientific classification
- Kingdom: Animalia
- Phylum: Chordata
- Class: Aves
- Order: Passeriformes
- Family: Thraupidae
- Genus: Geospizopsis; Bonaparte, 1856

Type species
- Geospizopsis typus = Passerculus geospizopsis Bonaparte, 1853

Species
- See text

= Geospizopsis =

Genus of birds

Geospizopsis is a genus of seed-eating birds in the tanager family Thraupidae that are commonly known as sierra finches.

== Taxonomy and species list ==
The two species now placed in Geospizopsis were formerly placed in the genus Phrygilus. A molecular phylogenetic study of the tanagers published in 2014 found that Phrygilus was polyphyletic. In the subsequent rearrangement to create monophyletic genera, the genus Geospizopsis was resurrected. It had originally been introduced in 1856 by the French naturalist Charles Lucien Bonaparte with Passerculus geospizopsis Bonaparte, 1853 as the type species. This taxon is now treated as a subspecies of the plumbeous sierra finch and has the trinomial name Geospizopsis unicolor geospizopsis. The genus name combines Geospiza, a genus introduced by John Gould in 1837, with the Ancient Greek opsis meaning "appearance".

The two species in the genus are:

Male	Female	Common name	Scientific name	Distribution
		Plumbeous sierra finch	Geospizopsis unicolor	Argentina, Bolivia, Chile, Colombia, Ecuador, Peru, and Venezuela.
		Ash-breasted sierra finch	Geospizopsis plebejus	Argentina, Bolivia, Chile, Ecuador, and Peru.
