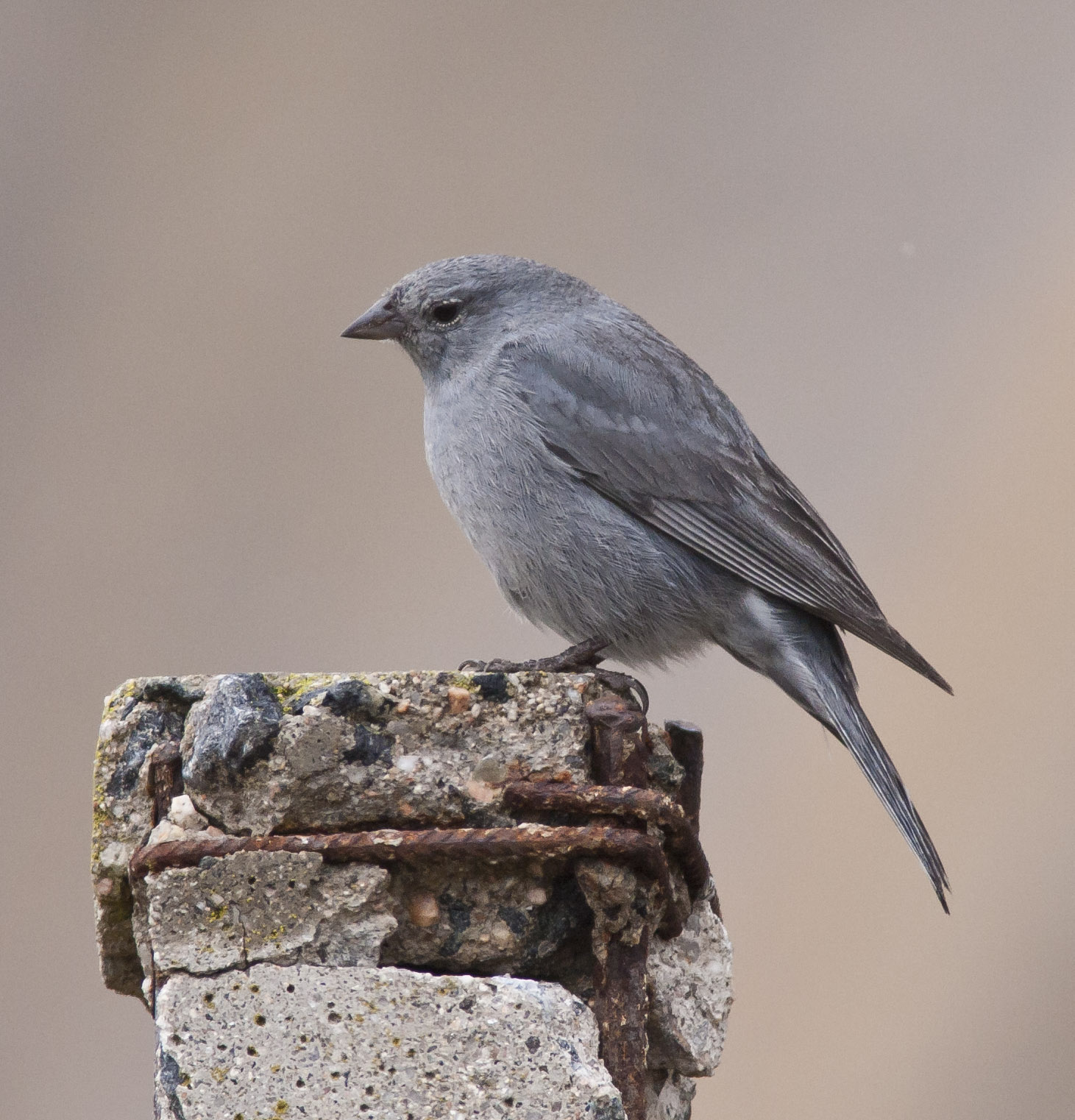
- A male in Argentina
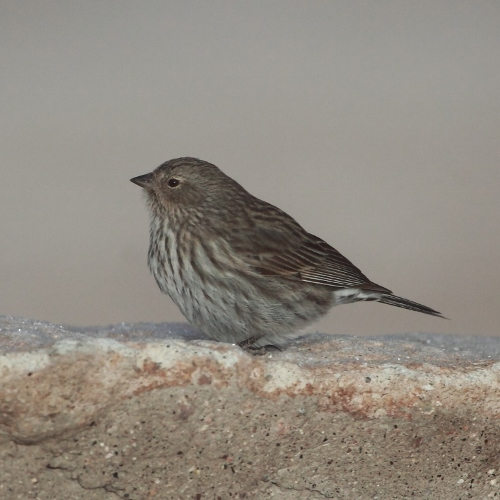
- A female at the El Tatio geyser in San Pedro de Atacama, Chile

Conservation status
- Least Concern (IUCN 3.1)

Scientific classification
- Kingdom: Animalia
- Phylum: Chordata
- Class: Aves
- Order: Passeriformes
- Family: Thraupidae
- Genus: Geospizopsis
- Species: G. unicolor

Binomial name
- Geospizopsis unicolor (Lafresnaye & d'Orbigny, 1837)

Synonyms
- Phrygilus unicolor

= Plumbeous sierra finch =

Species of bird

The plumbeous sierra finch (Geospizopsis unicolor) is a species of bird in the family Thraupidae.

It is found in Argentina, Bolivia, Chile, Colombia, Ecuador, Peru, and Venezuela. Its natural habitats are subtropical or tropical high-altitude grassland and pastureland.

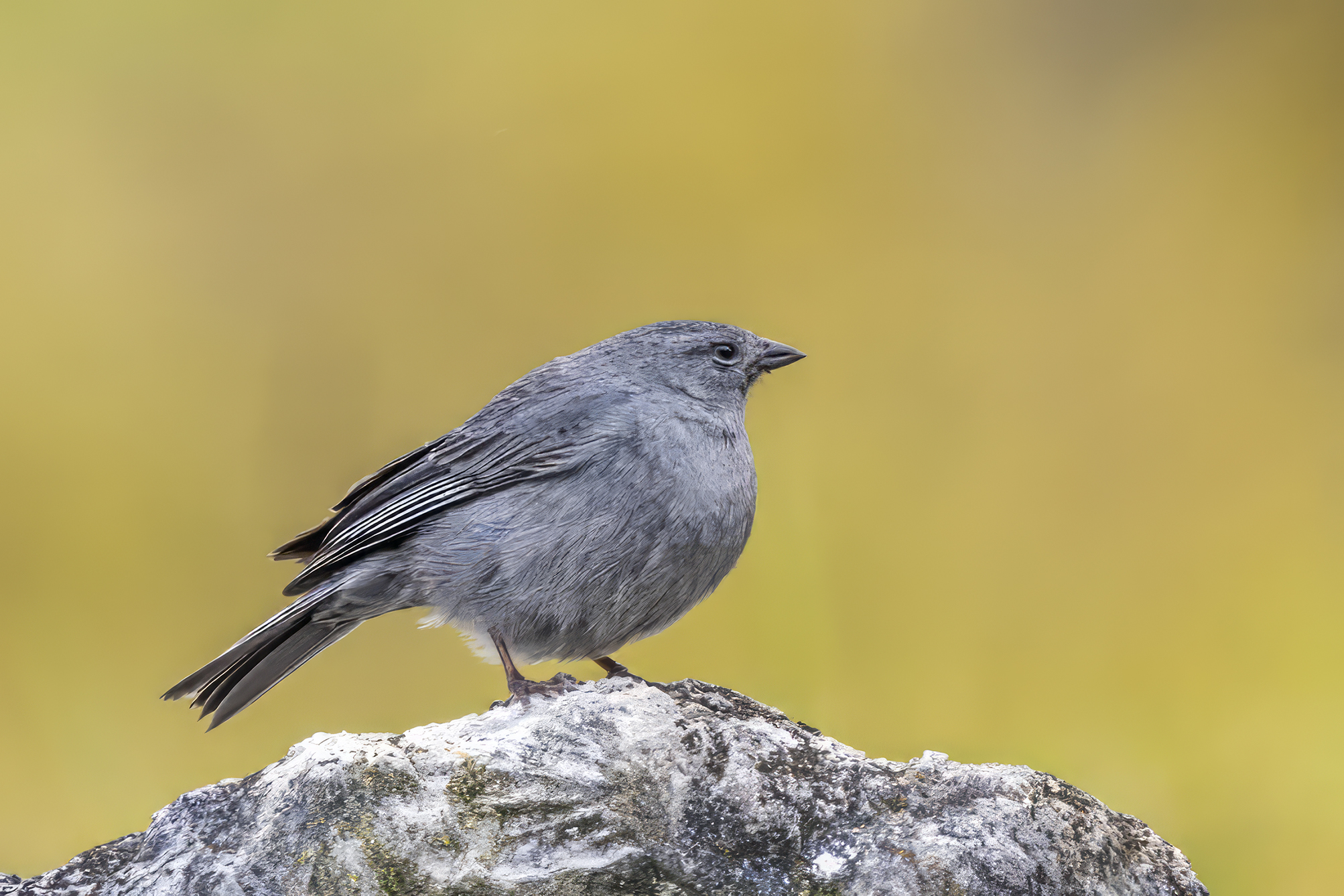
male G. u. geospizopsis, Colombia

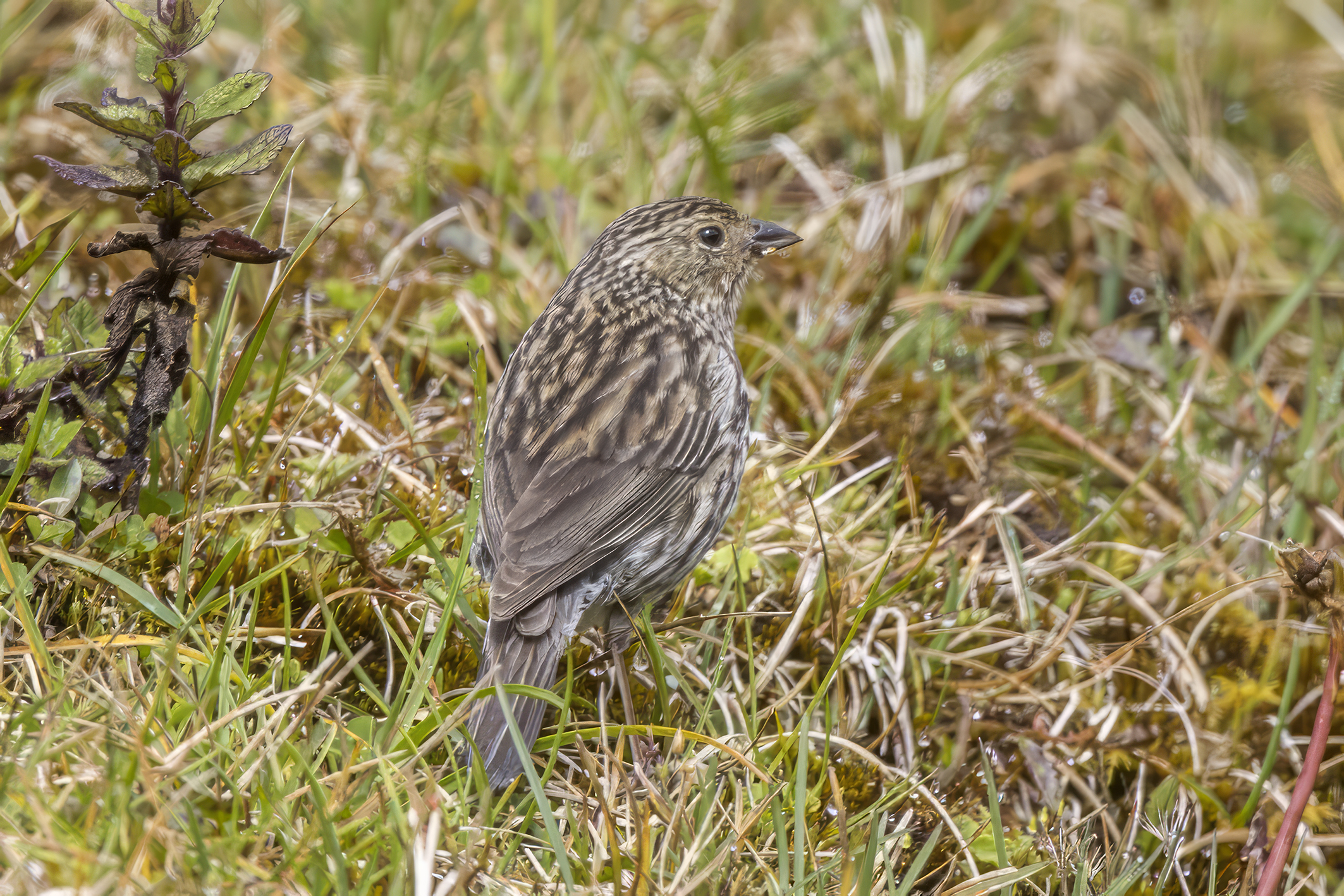
female G. u. geospizopsis, Colombia
