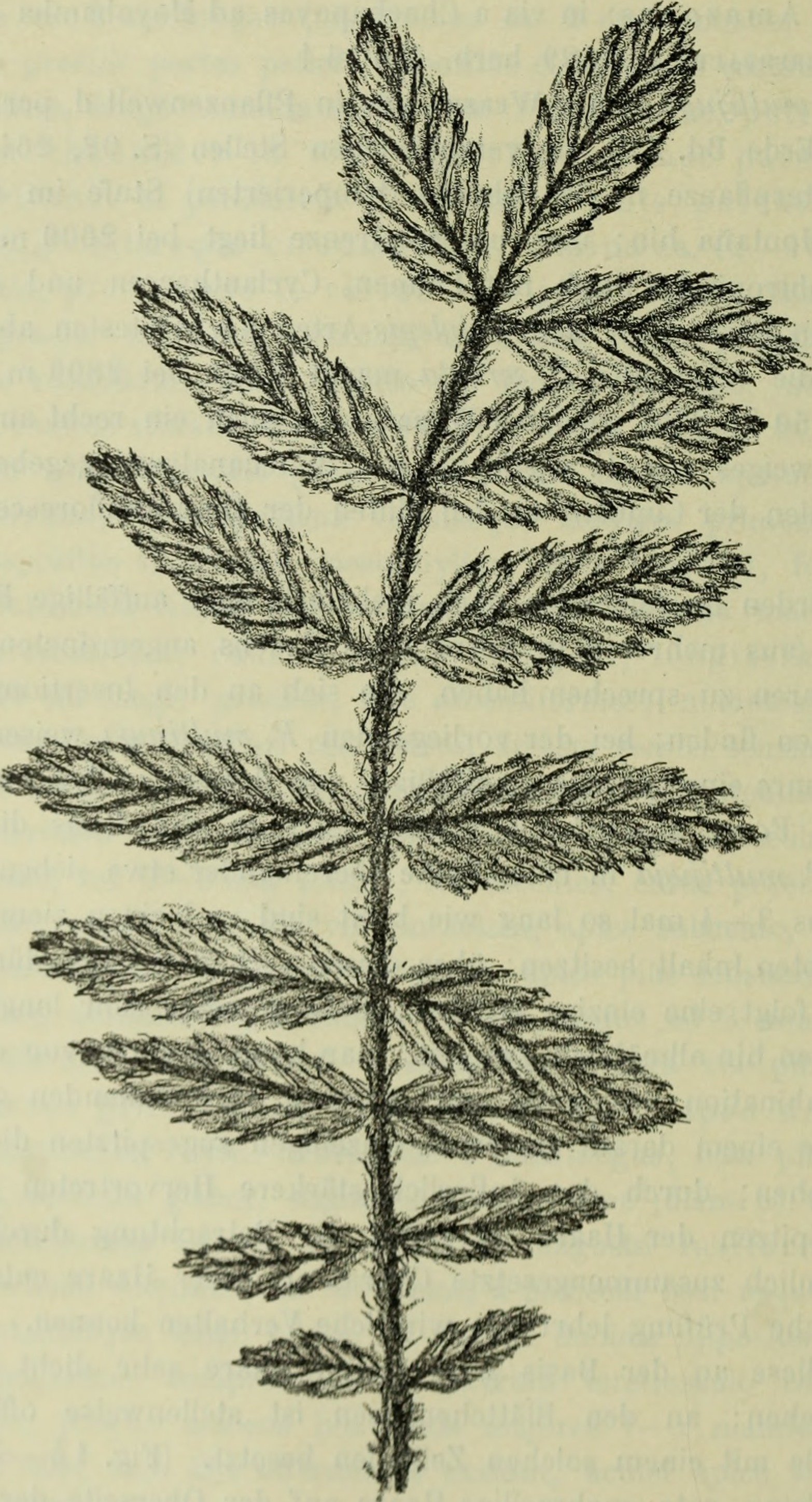
- Leaf of P. multijuga, as depicted in Engler's Botanische Jahrbücher für Systematik, Pflanzengeschichte und Pflanzengeographie (1910).

Conservation status
- Vulnerable (IUCN 2.3)

Scientific classification
- Kingdom: Plantae
- Clade: Tracheophytes
- Clade: Angiosperms
- Clade: Eudicots
- Clade: Rosids
- Order: Rosales
- Family: Rosaceae
- Genus: Polylepis
- Species: P. multijuga

Binomial name
- Polylepis multijuga Pilger

= Polylepis multijuga =

Species of plant

Polylepis multijuga is a species of plant in the family Rosaceae. It is endemic to montane forests in the Peruvian Northern Andes, between 2700 and 3600 meters above sea level. It is threatened by habitat loss.
