= Polylepis weberbaueri =

Conservation status
- Near Threatened (IUCN 3.1)

Scientific classification
- Kingdom: Plantae
- Clade: Tracheophytes
- Clade: Angiosperms
- Clade: Eudicots
- Clade: Rosids
- Order: Rosales
- Family: Rosaceae
- Genus: Polylepis
- Species: P. weberbaueri

Binomial name
- Polylepis weberbaueri Pilg.

Species of tree

Polylepis weberbaueri is a species of plant in the family Rosaceae. It is a shrub or tree found in Ecuador and Peru. The species was described in 1906, and is listed as Near Threatened by the IUCN.

== Taxonomy ==
Polylepis weberbaueri was described by Robert Knud Friedrich Pilger in 1906.

== Distribution ==
Polylepis weberbaueri is native to the montane tropial biome of Peru (Ancash, Huánuco, and Lima) and Ecuador. It grows at elevations of 3,500–4,970 metres (11,480–16,310 ft), and often co-occurs with Polylepis albicans.

== Description ==
Polylepis weberbaueri is a shrub or small tree that grows 0.5–8 metres (1.6–26.2 ft) high.

== Conservation ==
In 2023, the IUCN assessed Polylepis weberbaueri as Near Threatened. It is threatened by habitat loss. The species is present in Huascarán National Park, a protected area.
