= Polylepis subsericans =

Conservation status
- Vulnerable (IUCN 2.3)

Scientific classification
- Kingdom: Plantae
- Clade: Tracheophytes
- Clade: Angiosperms
- Clade: Eudicots
- Clade: Rosids
- Order: Rosales
- Family: Rosaceae
- Genus: Polylepis
- Species: P. subsericans

Binomial name
- Polylepis subsericans J.F.Macbr.

Species of plant

Polylepis subsericans is a species of plant in the family Rosaceae. It is endemic to Peru. It is threatened by habitat loss.
