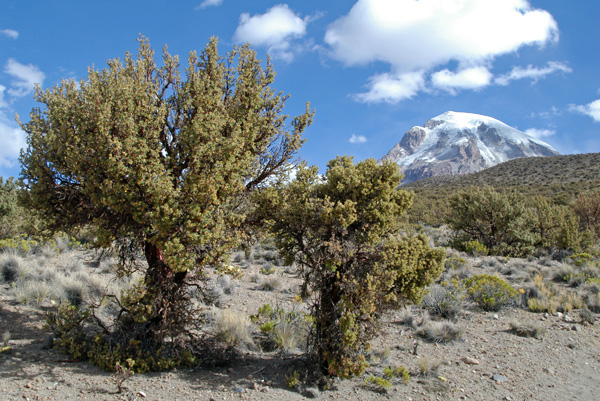
- Queñua trees on the slopes of Sajama volcano in the Bolivian Altiplano

Conservation status
- Vulnerable (IUCN 2.3)

Scientific classification
- Kingdom: Plantae
- Clade: Tracheophytes
- Clade: Angiosperms
- Clade: Eudicots
- Clade: Rosids
- Order: Rosales
- Family: Rosaceae
- Genus: Polylepis
- Species: P. rugulosa

Binomial name
- Polylepis rugulosa Bitter

= Polylepis rugulosa =

Species of tree

Polylepis rugulosa, the queñua, is a species of plant in the family Rosaceae. It is primarily found in the Andes region of South America in Argentina, Bolivia, Chile and Peru. It is currently threatened by habitat loss.

This is a small tree, which is unable to grow more than 4 metres in height. It features a reddish-brown bark with brilliant compound leaves. The tree's fruit and flowers are generally unnoticeable since they are shrouded by the tree's foliage.

In the Andes of the Department of Tacna, Peru, the queñua tend to grow more on western slopes than on eastern ones.

The tree has traditionally been used for firewood and coal-making.

== Images ==
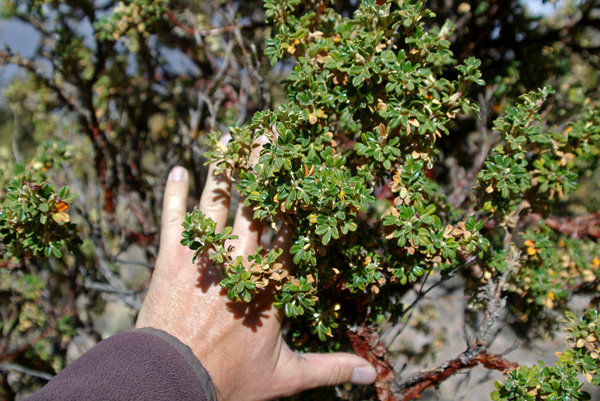
Queñua foliage

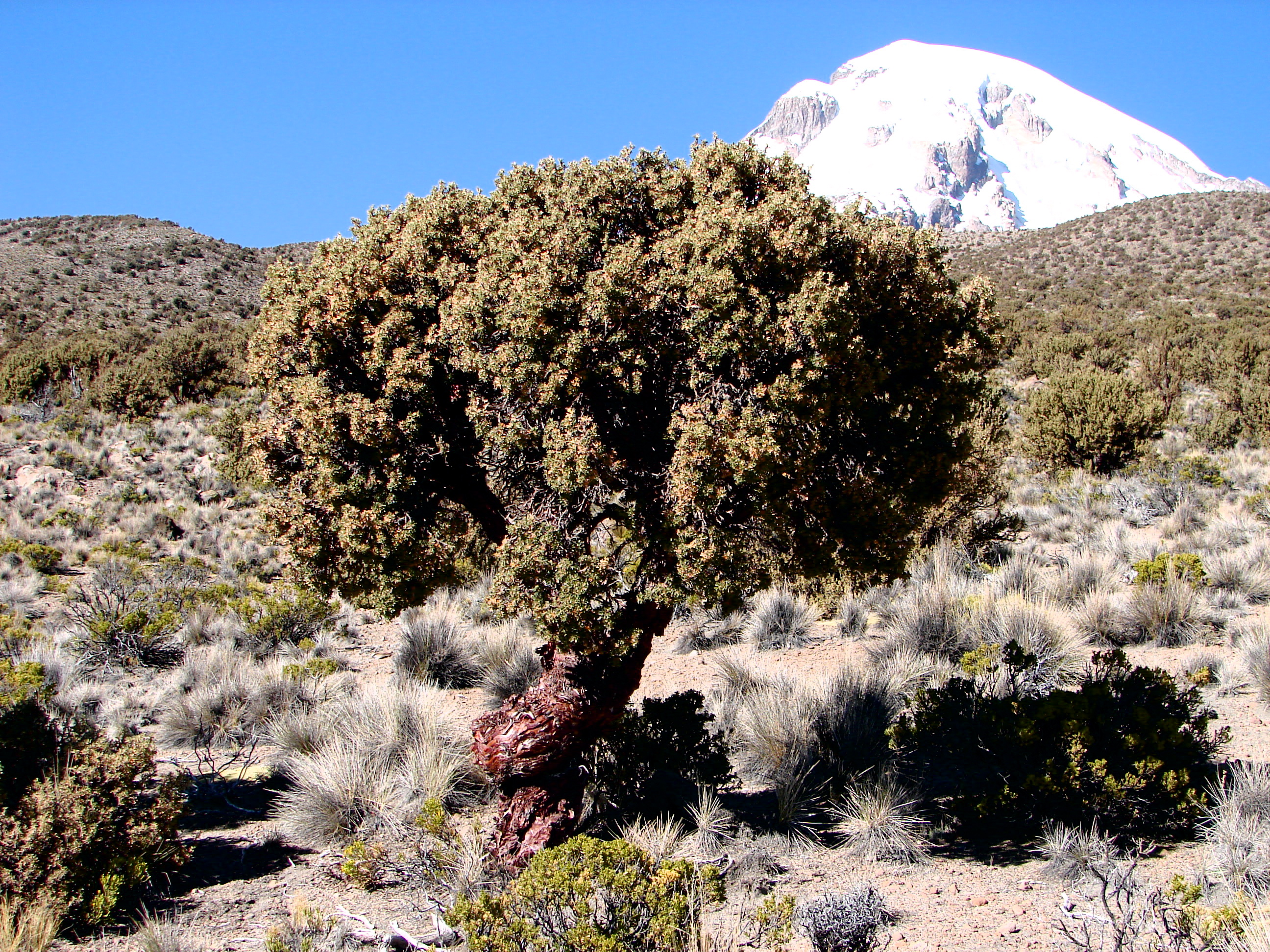
A mature queñua tree

== Sources ==
Media related to Polylepis rugulosa at Wikimedia Commons
