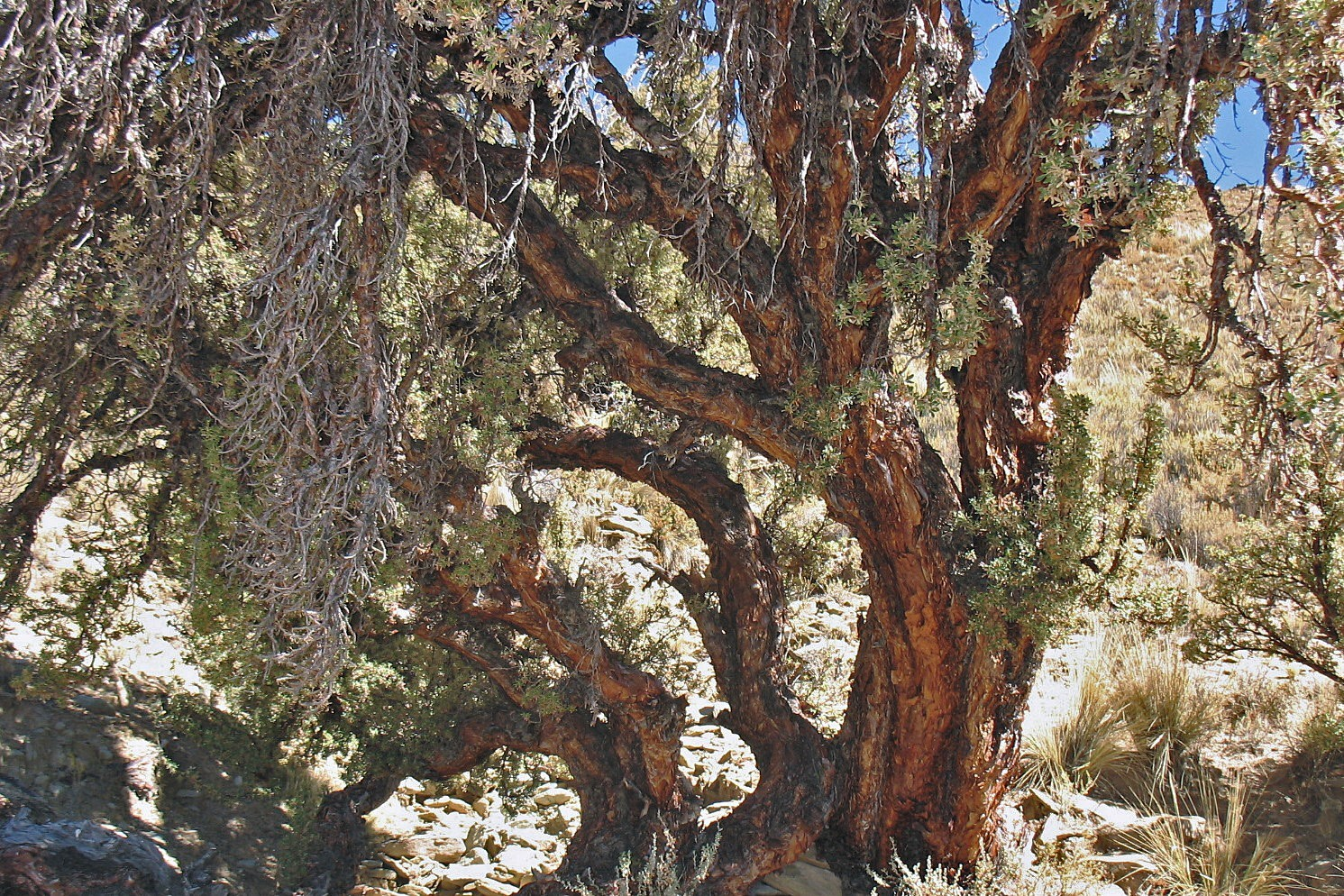
- In Jujuy Province, Argentina

Conservation status
- Near Threatened (IUCN 3.1)

Scientific classification
- Kingdom: Plantae
- Clade: Tracheophytes
- Clade: Angiosperms
- Clade: Eudicots
- Clade: Rosids
- Order: Rosales
- Family: Rosaceae
- Genus: Polylepis
- Species: P. tomentella

Binomial name
- Polylepis tomentella Wedd.

= Polylepis tomentella =

Species of plant

Polylepis tomentella is a plant in the family Rosaceae. It grows as a tree or shrub, up to 10 m (33 ft) tall. It is native to southern Bolivia and northwest Argentina, and grows at altitudes of 2,750–5,000 m (9,000–16,400 ft). The species is threatened by livestock farming and by its use for firewood.
