= Polylepis neglecta =

Conservation status
- Vulnerable (IUCN 2.3)

Scientific classification
- Kingdom: Plantae
- Clade: Tracheophytes
- Clade: Angiosperms
- Clade: Eudicots
- Clade: Rosids
- Order: Rosales
- Family: Rosaceae
- Genus: Polylepis
- Species: P. neglecta

Binomial name
- Polylepis neglecta M.Kessler

Species of flowering plant

Polylepis neglecta is a species of plant in the family Rosaceae. It is endemic to Bolivia. It is threatened by habitat loss.
