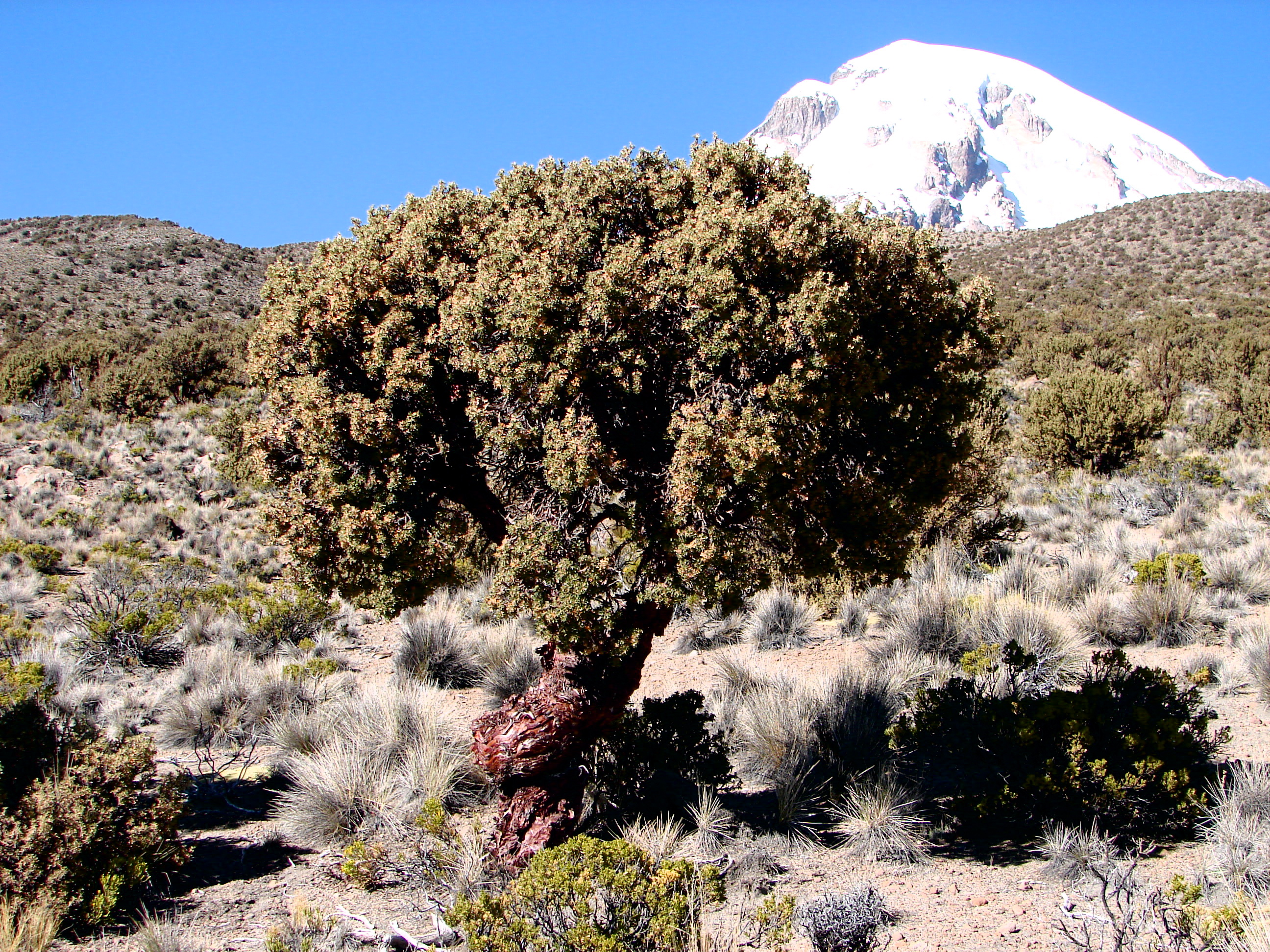
- Polylepis rugulosa

Scientific classification
- Kingdom: Plantae
- Clade: Tracheophytes
- Clade: Angiosperms
- Clade: Eudicots
- Clade: Rosids
- Order: Rosales
- Family: Rosaceae
- Subfamily: Rosoideae
- Tribe: Sanguisorbeae
- Subtribe: Sanguisorbinae
- Genus: Polylepis; Ruiz & Pav.

Species
- See text

= Polylepis =

Family of shrubs and trees

Polylepis is a genus comprising 44 recognized shrub and tree species, that are endemic to the mid- and high-elevation regions of the tropical Andes, up to 5,000 metres (16,000 ft) above sea level. It is distributed from Venezuela to Patagonia. In Peru, plants in the genus are known as queñual, queuña, or queñoa; in Bolivia, as kewiña; in Ecuador, as yagual; and in Argentina, tabaquillo.

This group is unique in the rose family in that it is predominantly wind-pollinated. They are usually gnarled in shape, but in certain areas some trees are 15–20 m tall and have 2 m-thick trunks. The foliage is evergreen, with dense small leaves, and often having large amounts of dead twigs hanging down from the underside of the canopy. The name Polylepis is, in fact, derived from the Greek words poly (many) plus lepis (scales, layers), referring to the shredding, multi-layered scaly bark that is common to all species in the genus. The bark is thick and rough and densely layered for protection against low temperatures.

Some species of Polylepis form woodlands growing well above normal tree line within grass and scrub associations at elevations over 5000 m; which makes Polylepis appear to be the highest naturally occurring woody angiosperm genus in the world.

== Classification/taxonomy ==
The genus Polylepis contains about 44 species that are distributed across the Andes. It is in the rose family, Rosaceae. The genus belongs to the tribe Sanguisorbeae, which mainly comprises herbs and small shrubs. Although the relationship of Polylepis to other genera of Sanguisorbeae is largely unknown, the analysis of Torsten Eriksson et al. (2003) showed evidence of a close relationship between Polylepis and Acaena, which shows tendencies towards having fused stipular sheaths, reddish, flaking-off bark, and axillary, somewhat pendant inflorescences, features otherwise characteristic of Polylepis. There are several characteristics that are important taxonomically to distinguish between species of Polylepis, notably 1) The amount of leaf congestion, 2) presence or absence of spurs and their size and vestiture, 3) the presence or absence and type of trichomes, (4) the size, shape, thickness and vestiture of leaflets. The most important taxonomic character, however, is the leaflets.

Studies suggest that repeated fragmentation and reconnection of páramo vegetation, caused by the Pleistocene climatic fluctuations, had a strong influence on the evolution and speed of speciation in the genus Polylepis as well as the páramo biota as a whole.

== Species ==
Accepted species include:

- Polylepis acomayensis T.Boza & M.Kessler
- Polylepis albicans Pilg.
- Polylepis argentea T.Boza & H.R.Quispe
- Polylepis australis Bitter
- Polylepis besseri Hieron.
- Polylepis canoi W.Mend.
- Polylepis crista-galli Bitter
- Polylepis fjeldsaoi T.Boza & M.Kessler
- Polylepis frontinensis T.Boza & M.Kessler
- Polylepis hieronymi Pilg.
- Polylepis humboldtii T.Boza, Romol. & M.Kessler
- Polylepis incana Kunth
- Polylepis incanoides (M.Kessler) T.Boza & M.Kessler
- Polylepis incarum (Bitter) M.Kessler & Schmidt-Leb.
- Polylepis lanata (Kuntze) M.Kessler & Schmidt-Leb.
- Polylepis lanuginosa Kunth
- Polylepis longipilosa T.Boza, Romol. & M.Kessler
- Polylepis loxensis T.Boza, Romol. & M.Kessler
- Polylepis microphylla (Wedd.) Bitter
- Polylepis multijuga Pilg.
- Polylepis nana (M.Kessler) T.Boza & M.Kessler
- Polylepis neglecta M.Kessler
- Polylepis occidentalis T.Boza & M.Kessler
- Polylepis ochreata (Wedd.) Bitter
- Polylepis pacensis M.Kessler & Schmidt-Leb.
- Polylepis pauta Hieron.
- Polylepis pepei B.B.Simpson
- Polylepis pilosissima T.Boza & M.Kessler
- Polylepis quadrijuga Bitter
- Polylepis racemosa Ruiz & Pav.
- Polylepis reticulata Hieron.
- Polylepis rodolfo-vasquezii L.Valenz. & Villalba
- Polylepis sacra T.Boza & M.Kessler
- Polylepis sericea Wedd.
- Polylepis serrata Pilg.
- Polylepis simpsoniae T.Boza & M.Kessler
- Polylepis subsericans J.F.Macbr.
- Polylepis subtusalbida (Bitter) M.Kessler & Schmidt-Leb.
- Polylepis tarapacana Phil.
- Polylepis tomentella Wedd.
- Polylepis triacontandra Bitter
- Polylepis weberbaueri Pilg.

== Habitat and distribution ==
Tree species in the genus Polylepis are confined to the high tropical South American Andes Mountains, with the most abundant concentrations of Polylepis ranging from northern Venezuela to northern Chile and adjacent Argentina. One known group of extra-tropical populations of Polylepis is distributed in the mountains of Northwestern Argentina. Most species of Polylepis grow best at high elevations between 3500 and 5000 meters. However, there are occurrences of species at altitudes as low as 1800 meters. These low altitude species are mixed with montane forest which indicates that components of the genus could have been present in western South America during the Miocene Period or even earlier. It is extremely rare for tree species to live at such altitudes, making Polylepis one of the highest naturally occurring trees along with the conifers of the Himalayan Mountains. Polylepis racemosa grows as shrubby trees on steep, rocky slopes above cloud forest. Polylepis tarapacana is one that reaches 4,800 m; the highest elevation of tree growth in the world.

There is much debate on whether Polylepis was forced to exhibit such extreme elevation habitats due to habitat destruction by human interference. Physiological tolerances for growth at these elevations are subject to considerable debate among scientists, but evidence indicates that even before severe decimation by man, high elevation trees were limited in their distribution by the presence of specialized microhabitats. Due to the harsh environment in which many species of Polylepis grow, the growth of the tree's stems and branches are generally contorted. This abnormal growth is often associated with windy, cold or arid habitats. The climate of the South American Andes changes drastically throughout the region creating many microhabitats. Overall, the climate consists of short southern summers when temperatures are warm and rainfall is high and long winters when temperatures are low and rainfall is limited. The temperature and amount of rainfall also depend on which side of the mountain (eastern or western side), elevation and latitude.

== Morphological characteristics ==
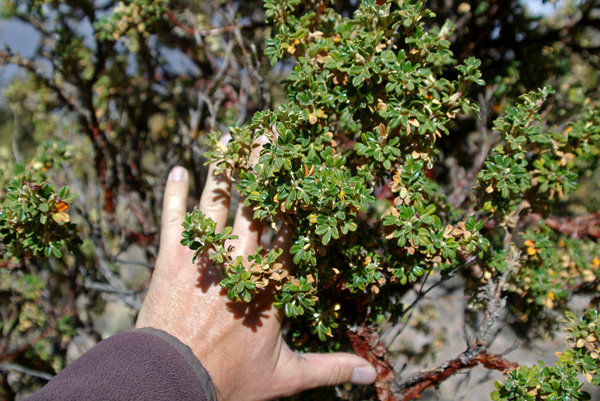
Queñua leaves (P. rugulosa)

Bark: The bark of Polylepis consists of numerous layers of thin, dark red exfoliating sheets. In some cases, the layered bark can be more than an inch thick. A majority of the larger branches have similar shredding bark. It would seem that the bark serves as insulation from both the nightly frosts and the intense daytime irradiation. The thick bark of Polylepis also serves an important function as protection against fire. It is thought to originally have been a protection against epiphytic mosses, whose thick masses may damage trees by adding weight to the branches and providing a suitable environment for fungi which attack the trees.

Branching pattern and leaf arrangement: Polylepis trees tend to have twisted, crooked stems and branches with repeated sympodial branching. Contorted growth is often associated with windy, cold, or arid habitats. The leaves are generally congested along the branch tips often at the end of long, naked branch segments.

Stipule sheath: Each leaf has a pair of stipules fused around the branch forming a sheath. The crowding of the leaves results in a pattern of stacked, inverted cones due to the overlapping of the stipule sheaths. On the top of the sheaths on either side of the petiole there are often projections, or spurs. The presence or absence of these spurs and their size are important taxonomic characteristics.

Leaves and leaflets: All species of Polylepis have compound, imparipinnate leaves, but the number of pairs of leaflets varies within and between species. The arrangement of the leaflets and the position from the terminal leaflet of the largest pair of leaflets determine the shape of the leaf. The outline of the leaf is usually rhombic in species with one pair of leaflets. Depending on the position of the largest pair, the leaf can be trullate to obtrullate in taxa with more than one leaflet pair.

Leaf anatomy: The leaves of all species are built on a dorsiventral arrangement of cells, with the epidermis and palisade layer on the adaxial surface and the spongy tissue on the abaxial surface.

== Reproduction ==
The pollen of Polylepis can be described as monads, isopolar, and more or less spheroidal to slightly oblate in shape. They have both an elongated and rounded aperture and the limits of the endoaperture (the inner openings of compound the aperture) are obscure. The elongated part of the aperture is completely covered by a pontoperculum.

The fruit of Polylepis are essentially achenes composed of the floral cup fused to the ovary. Fruit of all species are indehiscent (they do not open at maturity) and one seeded. The surface of the fruit of different species has ridges, knobs, spines or wings. There are no definite sites for the placement of these different types of protrusions that appear irregularly over the surface. The type of protrusion, wings verses spines, or knobs versus wings, is useful for distinguishing between species.

The flowers of all species of the genus are born on inflorescences. In most cases the inflorescences are long enough to hang like a pendant, but in the westernmost populations of P. tomentella and in at least one population of P. pepei, the inflorescence is so reduced that it remains almost hidden in the leaf axil. In the species with pendant inflorescences, the flowers are born regularly along the rachis or clustered toward the terminal end. The flowers themselves are reduced and have many features associated with wind pollination. These include: the absence of petals, green rather than colored sepals, an absence of scent or nectar, numerous anthers with long filaments, abundant, dry pollen, a large, spreading, fine fringed stigma, compounded pinnate leaves and the growth of trees in strands.

== Pollination and dispersal ==
Wind-pollination was a useful and evolutionary event in the adaption to the highlands, where insects are much scarcer than in warmer climates. By relying on wind for pollination, species distribution and phylogeny reconstruction have different patterns than insect-pollinated genus. Wind pollination allows genetic information to cover large distances and hurdle reproductive barriers.

The fruit of all of the species is primarily wind dispersed, because members of the genus are shrubs or trees too tall for animals (mainly mammals) to brush against on the ground. However, the elaboration of spines on the fruit of many taxa could argue for animal dispersal, although wind dispersal undoubtedly predominates in P. australis. Numerous birds forage or live in Polylepis trees and it is possible that they disperse fruit caught in their feathers.

== Ecology ==
Mountain forest ecosystems have drastically changed due to human disruption such as cutting, burning and grazing, which causes fragmentation of the forest landscape. Polylepis contains some unique forms of autoecological (population ecology) and synecological relationships. Since they are located at high altitudes, they are equipped with specializations that help them withstand the harsh conditions. They are semiarid with a mean annual rainfall average between 200 and 500 mm. Tropical habitats found above 3600 m are subject to extreme diurnal changes. In midday, the temperatures may reach somewhere around 10-12 °C (or higher). This causes the soil lower than the top 30 cm to maintain a constant temperature of about 2-5 °C (or lower) all year. Thus plants stay active throughout the year and do not become dormant. Given these harsh circumstances, the growth of trees in such areas should be impossible. The reasons for the ability of Polylepis to inhabit such conditions have been studied by many. Carl Troll, for example, considered Polylepis to be a distinct type of vegetation and he claimed one of the reasons for their survival is the presence of microclimatic phenomena such as the formation of cloud layers on slopes and along low drainage areas, prevented nighttime freezes and producing what he called "lower elevation" conditions. Another study was done by Hoch and Korner which provided that Polylepis has slow growth making it a weak competitor. Therefore, if the temperatures become warmer and more humid, Polylepis tends to lose out to the species that are more vigorous.

== Conservation issues ==
Polylepis forests exist primarily as small, widely isolated fragments, which are being rapidly depleted by rural communities. Remaining Polylepis forests are used for firewood and building material and provide protection against erosion and habitats for endangered animals. In some countries, conservation and reforestation measures are underway.

In 2000, biologist Constantino Aucca founded Ecoan, an NGO promoting conservation of threatened species and endangered Andean ecosystems. Since then, the organization has reforested 4.5 million plants across 16 protected areas, involving 37 Andean communities in the process.

Aucca's efforts caught the attention of Florent Kaiser, a Franco-German forest engineer. During a visit to Peru in 2018, Aucca invited Kaiser to the Queuña Raymi festival, where Cusco communities engage in queñual reforestation.

== Human use ==
Since Polylepis inhabits extremely high elevations, it has played an important role in the culture of various Andean Indigenous groups by providing building material and firewood. The woodlands themselves constitute a distinctive habitat for other organisms allowing for the creation of endemic fauna in the future. The trees are also used as decoration; planted in front of buildings and houses. As a result of people expanding their reach, Polylepis have been subjected to harvest for firewood, the clearing of woodlands for pastureland and the destruction of seedlings by domesticated animals. Few trees have been found growing on level ground and are subsequently located on "inaccessible" slopes.
