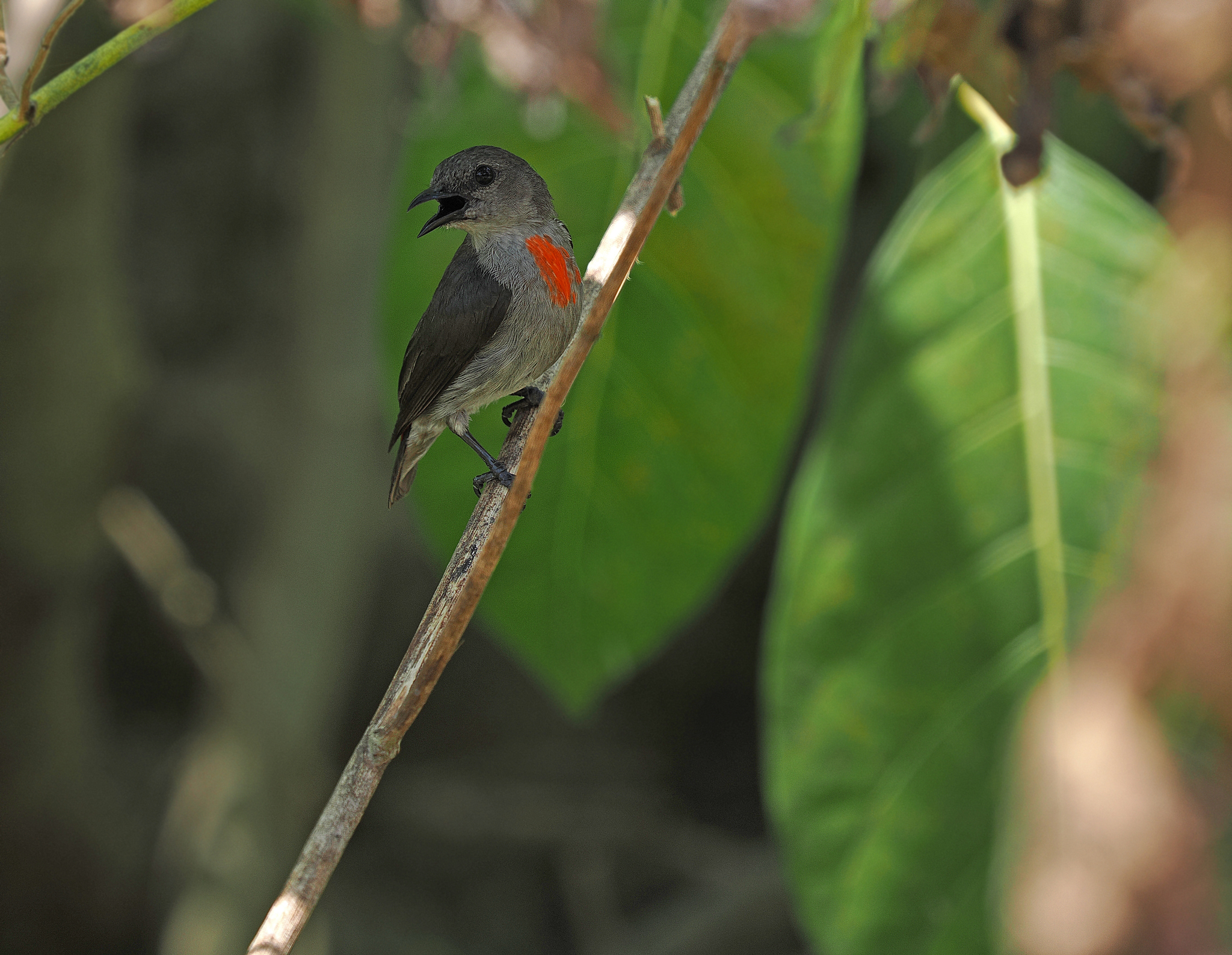

Conservation status
- Least Concern (IUCN 3.1)

Scientific classification
- Kingdom: Animalia
- Phylum: Chordata
- Class: Aves
- Order: Passeriformes
- Family: Dicaeidae
- Genus: Dicaeum
- Species: D. vulneratum

Binomial name
- Dicaeum vulneratum Wallace, 1863

= Ashy flowerpecker =

Species of bird

The ashy flowerpecker (Dicaeum vulneratum) is a species of bird in the family Dicaeidae. It is endemic to Indonesia where it occurs on Seram, Ambon and nearby islands in the Banda Arc. Its natural habitats are subtropical or tropical moist lowland forest and subtropical or tropical moist montane forest.

== Taxonomy and systematics ==
The ashy flowerpecker is closely related to several other species in the genus Dicaeum, forming a species complex with the crimson-crowned flowerpecker, the Buru flowerpecker, the olive-crowned flowerpecker, the Halmahera flowerpecker, the red-banded flowerpecker, and the midget flowerpecker.

Despite being found on several islands, the species is monotypic.

== Description ==
Ashy flowerpeckers range between 8 and 8.5 cm in length. The species is dimorphic - both adult males and females have primarily brown upperparts and gray underparts with black legs and bill and a red patch on the rump (this patch is yellowish-green in juveniles), but males have a red patch on the breast, while females have a white throat and breast. Apart from rump color, juveniles are similar to females in coloration.

The ashy flowerpecker's thin, high-pitched song varies throughout its range. On Ambon, it consists of three trisyllabic notes, while on Seram, it consists of three disyllabic notes.

== Distribution and habitat ==
The ashy flowerpecker is found on the island of Seram, as well as the surrounding islands of Saparua, Boano, Ambon, and the islands of the Gorong archipelago. Within that range, it favors both forests and more degraded woody areas like gardens and farm edges. It can be found anywhere between sea level and 2100 meters in elevation but is most common between 300 and 600 meters.

== Behavior and ecology ==
=== Breeding ===
Ashy flowerpeckers build globular nests out of plant fibers and leaves.

=== Food and feeding ===
Ashy flowerpeckers feed primarily on nectar, but might also consume mistletoe pollen and fruit. They forage both in the forest canopy and at lower levels, joining mixed-species flocks in addition to foraging individually.

== Status ==
The ashy flowerpecker is a common species within its very limited range and is not considered threatened.

== Gallery ==
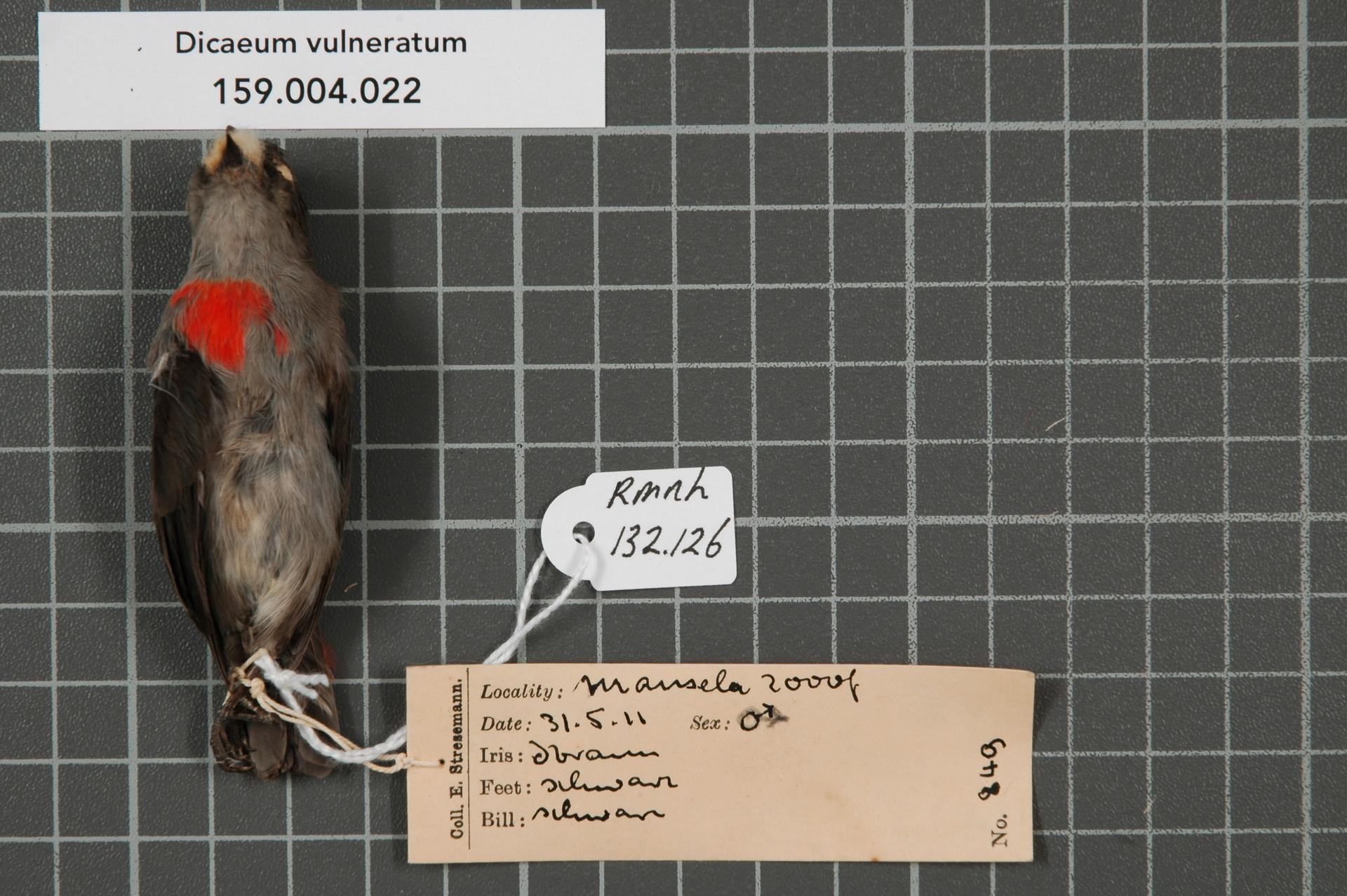
male

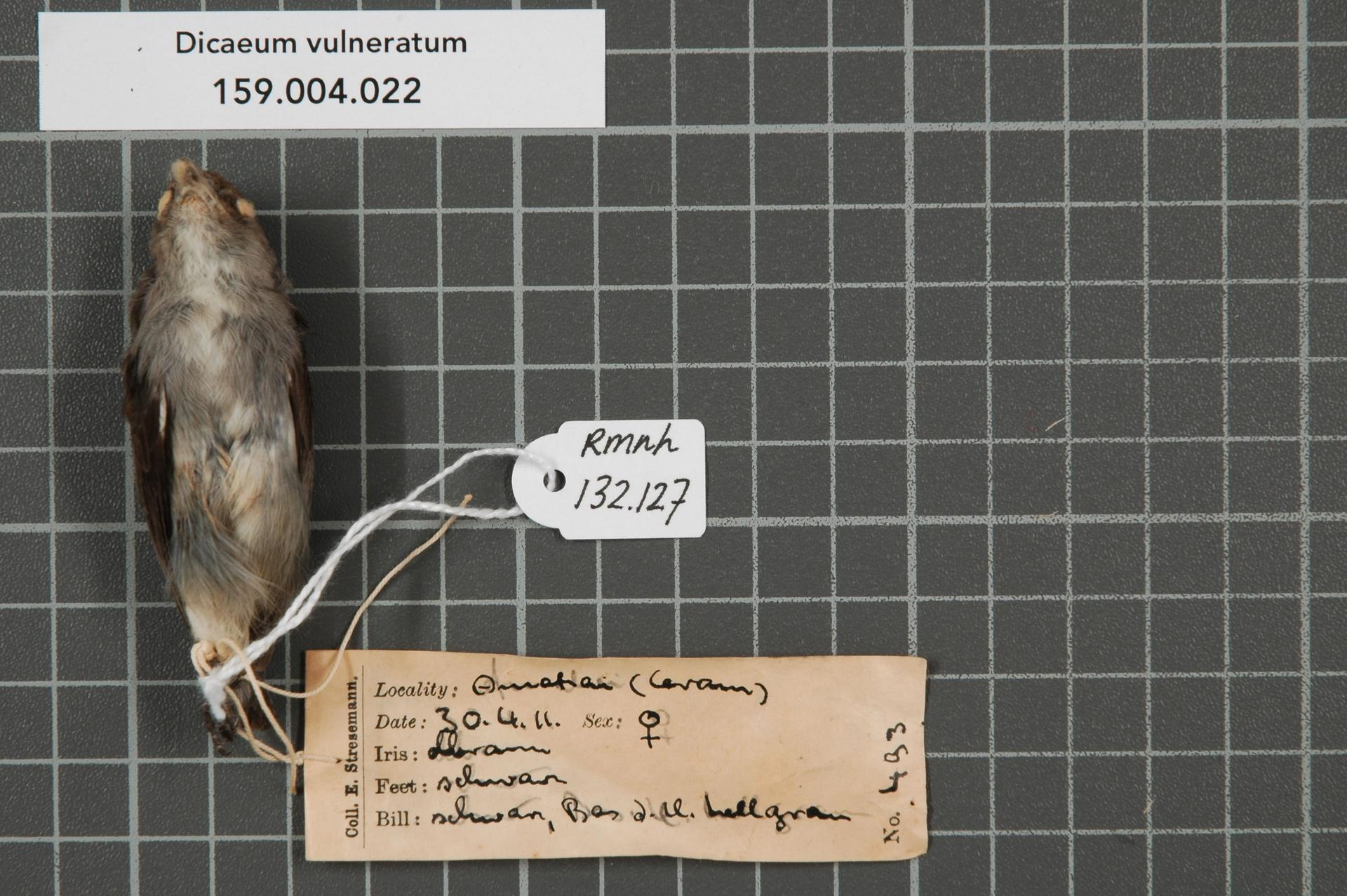
female

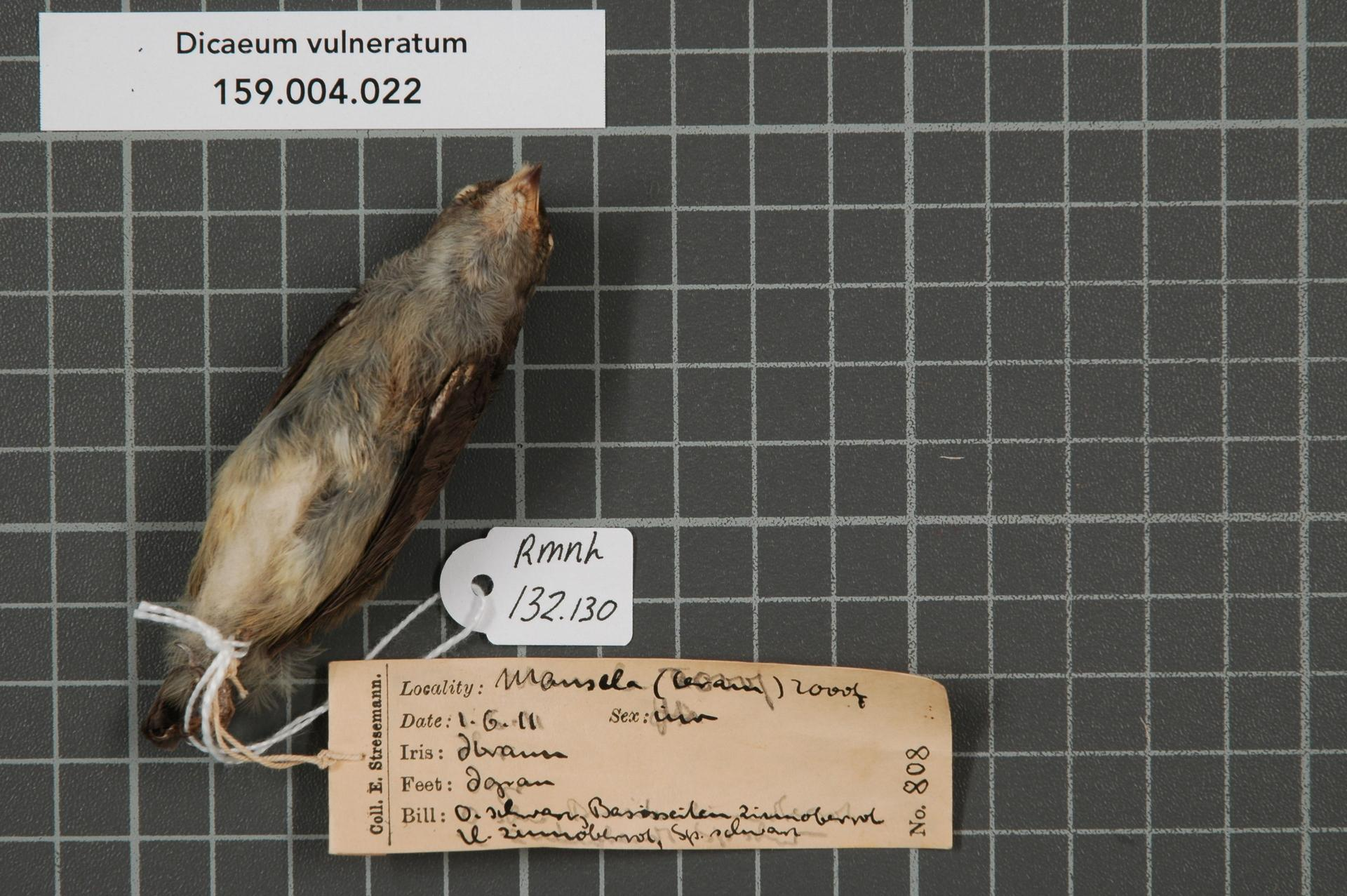
immature
