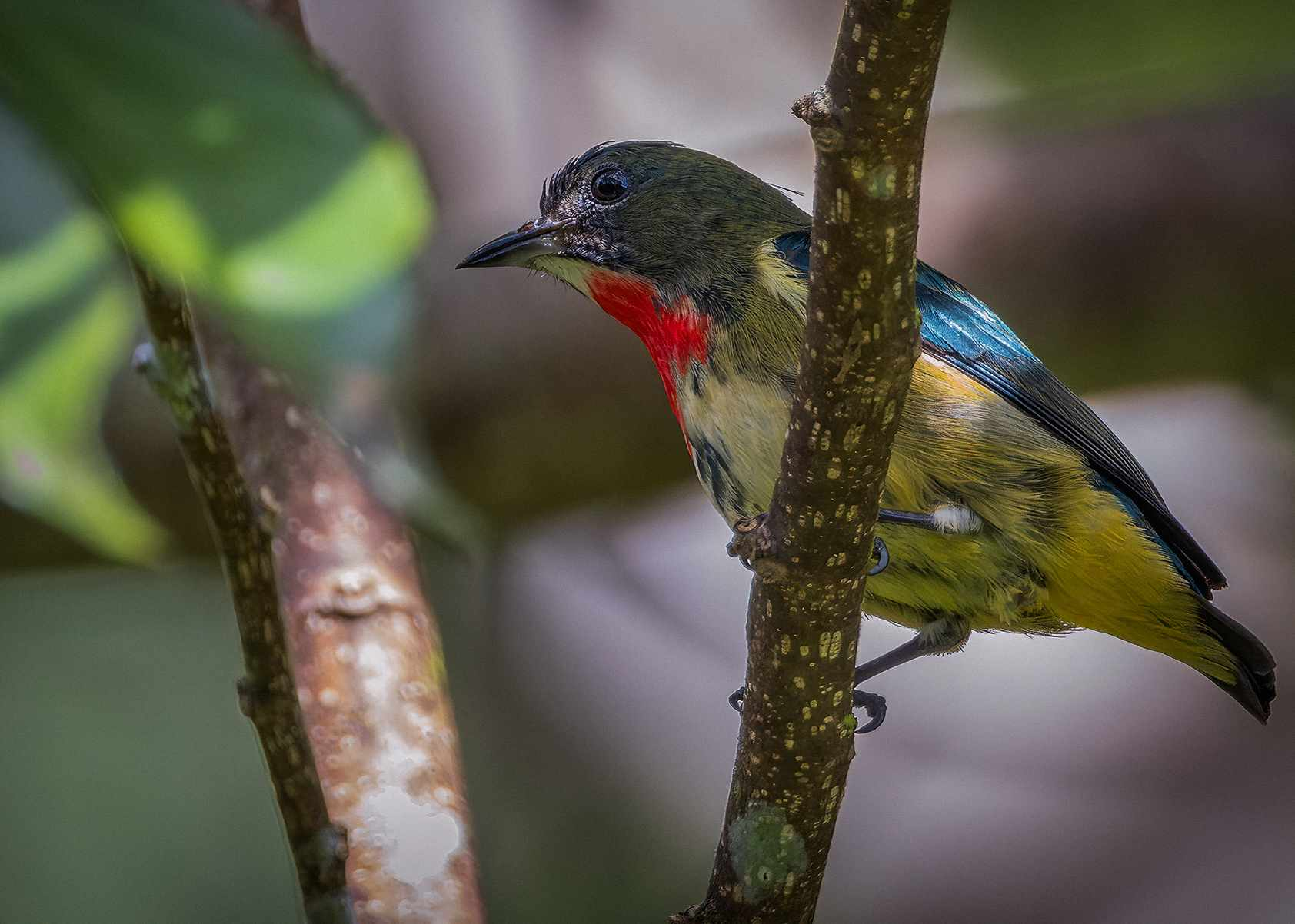
- Male of the nominate subspecies

Conservation status
- Least Concern (IUCN 3.1)

Scientific classification
- Kingdom: Animalia
- Phylum: Chordata
- Class: Aves
- Order: Passeriformes
- Family: Dicaeidae
- Genus: Dicaeum
- Species: D. luzoniense

Binomial name
- Dicaeum luzoniense Ogilvie-Grant, 1894

= Fire-throated flowerpecker =

Species of bird

The fire-throated flowerpecker (Dicaeum luzoniense) is a species of bird in the flowerpecker family Dicaeidae that is found in the Philippines except on the islands of Mindoro, the Palawan group and the Sulu Archipelago. It was formerly considered to be a subspecies of the fire-breasted flowerpecker (Dicaeum ignipectus).

== Description and taxonomy ==
The fire-throated flowerpecker was formally described in 1894 by the Scottish ornithologist William Robert Ogilvie-Grant based on specimens collected by the zoologist and explorer John Whitehead in the mountains of northern Luzon in the Philippines. Ogilvie-Grant coined the binomial name Dicaeum luzoniense. The fire-throated flowerpecker was formerly considered to be a subspecies of the fire-breasted flowerpecker (Dicaeum ignipectus) species complex, which includes the Cambodian flowerpecker, Sumatran flowerpecker. It is differentiated by a less extensive amount of red with it mostly in the throat, hence the name Fire-throated instead of Fire-breasted, slightly larger size and substantial differences in voice in which its song is at a slower paced and lower

=== Subspecies ===
Three subspecies are recognised:

- D. l. luzoniense Ogilvie-Grant, 1894 – montane Luzon (north Philippines)
- D. l. apo Hartert, EJO, 1904 – Western Visayas and Mindanao (central west, south Philippines); similar to nominate but head and neck sides are glossier, the vent and undeertail brighter and the sides on abdomen are darker.
- D. l. bonga Hartert, EJO, 1904 – Samar (central east Philippines); smaller and male has a darker head. It was only known from its holotype collected in 1896 at just 100 meters above sea level which has been the only true lowland record of this species. For over a century, it was theorized that this specimen was mislabled but in 2025 this subspecies was photographed for the first time ever.

== Ecology and behavior ==
Not much is known about its diet but it is pressumed to have the typical flowerpecker diet of small fruits, insects, nectar especially from mistletoes. Typically seen singly or in pairs and does not form large groups of its own species but joins mixed species flocks.

== Habitat and conservation status ==
Its natural habitats are tropical moist montane forest from 1,000 meters above sea level. However, the Samar subspecies bonga was collected in 1896 below 100 meters above sea level and in 2025 at 200 meters above sea level in primary moist lowland forest.

The IUCN has classified the species as being of Least Concern despite being uncommon across its range. Montane forest faces less deforestation compared to lowland forest but deforestation in the Philippines continues due to slash-and-burn farming, land conversion and mining.

It is found in multiple protected areas such as Mount Banahaw, Mount Kitanglad. Mount Apo, Mount Pulag, Samar Island Natural Park and Northern Sierra Madre Natural Park but like all areas in the Philippines, protection is lax and deforestation continues despite this protection on paper.
