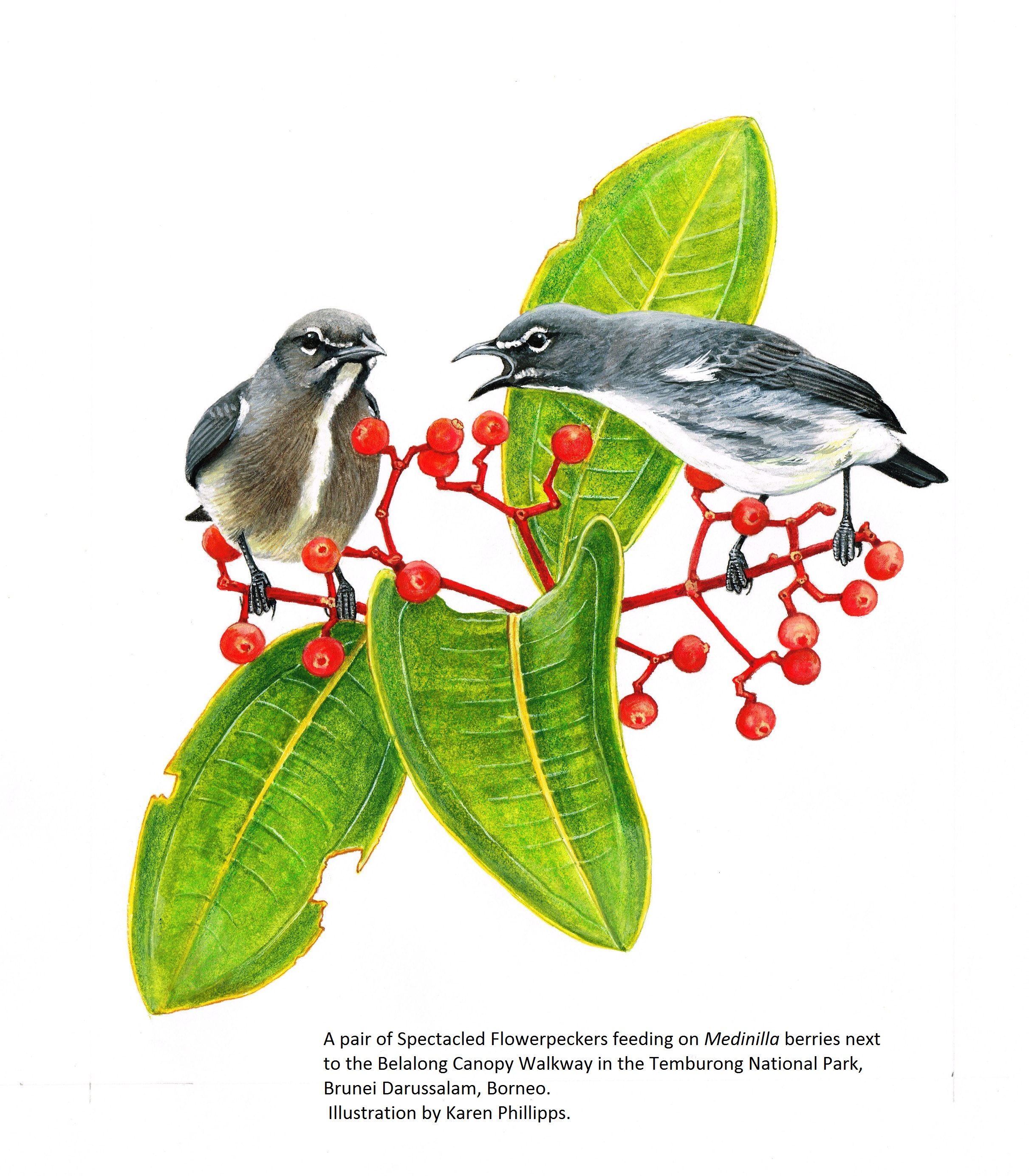

Conservation status
- Data Deficient (IUCN 3.1)

Scientific classification
- Kingdom: Animalia
- Phylum: Chordata
- Class: Aves
- Order: Passeriformes
- Family: Dicaeidae
- Genus: Dicaeum
- Species: D. dayakorum

Binomial name
- Dicaeum dayakorum Saucier et al., 2019

= Spectacled flowerpecker =

Species of bird

The spectacled flowerpecker (Dicaeum dayakorum) is a species of bird belonging to the flowerpecker family, Dicaeidae. It was first observed in 2009 in the forests of Borneo, but due to limited information and the lack of a specimen for scientific study, it was not formally described or given a scientific name until 2019.

== Taxonomy and systematics ==
Due to the difficulty in collecting a type specimen for research, the spectacled flowerpecker remained without a recognized scientific name for over a decade after its initial discovery. In January 2017, the Institute of Biodiversity and Environmental Research (IBER) at the Universiti Brunei Darussalam (UBD) issued a press release announcing their intention to capture, collect and formally name the spectacled flowerpecker by trapping a visiting flowerpecker at the Belalong Canopy walkway. However, no specimen was captured until 2019, when ornithologists Christopher Milensky and Jacob Saucier captured an individual in the Lanjak Entimau Wildlife Sanctuary in southwestern Borneo, miles from the areas where sightings of the bird were usually reported. Genetic analysis of the specimen found it to not only be a distinct species, but also not closely related to any of the other species in the genus Dicaeum. The specific epithet, dayakorum, is intended to honor the Dayak people, whose knowledge of the ecosystem is critical for conservation efforts in Borneo.

== Description ==
The first bird sighted had prominent white arcs above and below the eyes, creating a broken eye-ring effect. The white throat was bordered by a diffuse dusky malar, merging into grey sides separated by a white stripe from the throat to the centre of the underparts. The upperparts were slate-grey. There were prominent, pure white pectoral tufts emerging from the carpal joints. The eyes, bill and legs were dark. A different bird seen on 20 June was less well marked, with paler grey plumage, less prominent eye-rings and pectoral tufts, and a less defined stripe down the breast, which, as well as the vent, was marked with a hint of yellow. Edwards et al. (2009) suggest that two adult individuals were seen, with the more strikingly marked bird the male and the less well-marked bird the female. The prominent broken white eye-rings suggested the use of the term "spectacled" for the common name.

=== Vocalisation ===
Vocalisations heard include two very short, hard flight-notes, similar to those made by the fire-breasted flowerpecker, when an individual alighted and departed. Also, a well-marked putative male bird singing, with a series of about 12 high-pitched see notes, rising and then falling in pitch.

== Distribution and habitat ==
The new flowerpecker was first observed and photographed on 18 June 2009 by Richard Webster, a tropical ecologist, at the Borneo Rainforest Lodge within the Danum Valley Conservation Area, Sabah, Malaysia. Further sightings and photographs of more than one individual were made over the next two days by Webster, David Edwards from the University of Leeds, and Rose Ann Rowlett. The lodge is sited within unlogged tropical rainforest, 180 m asl at 5°01'43"N 117°45'5"E. The sightings were made from an observation platform on a suspended walkway within the rainforest canopy. The height of the birds sighted was over 40 m above ground level. Subsequently, the spectacled flowerpecker has been photographed at the Maliau Basin in Sabah, Labi Road and the Belalong Canopy Walkway in Brunei and in Central Kalimantan. Recent sightings and photographs indicate that it is a regular visitor to the Belalong Canopy Walkway in the Ulu Temburong National Park, Brunei Darussalam. The type specimen was captured in Lanjak Entimau Wildlife Sanctuary, Malaysia, where the species is not previously known from.

== Behaviour and ecology ==
=== Feeding ===
When first observed the birds at Danum Valley In Sabah were feeding in a fruiting epiphytic mistletoe that was parasitising a large Koompassia excelsa tree. Other species of flowerpecker seen visiting the same mistletoe included the yellow-breasted, yellow-rumped, yellow-vented and orange-bellied flowerpeckers. A bird photographed by Hanyrol H Ahmad Sah from the Belalong Canopy Walkway in Brunei was feeding on the ripe orange berries of an epiphytic Medinilla plant at canopy level. At Bukit Batikap in Central Kalimantan, spectacled flowerpeckers have been observed feeding on Viscum mistletoe berries.

=== Ecology ===
Edwards et al. (2009) speculate that the spectacled flowerpecker is a rainforest canopy specialist, relying on ephemeral epiphytic fruits such as mistletoes, being highly mobile and rarely, if ever, visiting the understory of the forest - explaining why the new species remained undetected for so long.
