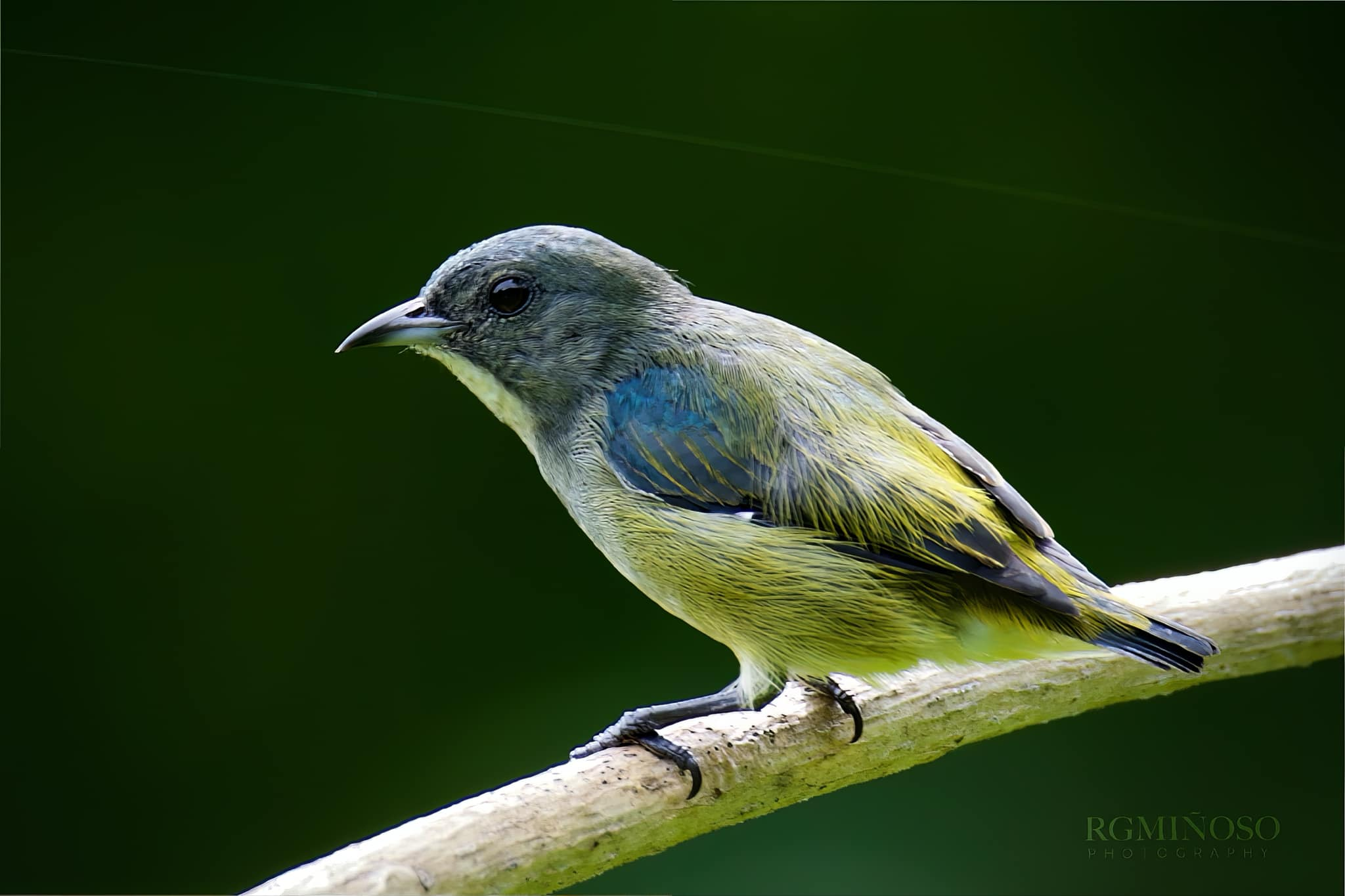

Conservation status
- Least Concern (IUCN 3.1)

Scientific classification
- Kingdom: Animalia
- Phylum: Chordata
- Class: Aves
- Order: Passeriformes
- Family: Dicaeidae
- Genus: Dicaeum
- Species: D. pygmaeum

Binomial name
- Dicaeum pygmaeum (Kittlitz, 1833)

= Pygmy flowerpecker =

Species of bird

The pygmy flowerpecker (Dicaeum pygmaeum) is a species of bird in the family Dicaeidae. It is endemic to the Philippines.

Its natural habitats are tropical moist lowland forest and tropical moist montane forest.

== Description and taxonomy ==
=== Subspecies ===
Five subspecies are recognized:

- D. p.pygmaeum — Found on Luzon (except Northwest), Corregidor, Lubang, Polillo Is, Mindoro, Marinduque, Maestre de Campo, Semirara, Sibay, Boracay, Romblon, Sibuyan, Ticao, Masbate, Samar, Gigantes, Calagnaan, Sicogon, Guimaras, Negros, Cebu, Bohol, Siquijor and Leyte
- D. p. davao — Found on Camiguin Sur and Mindanao
- D. p. palawanorum — Found on Calauit, Culion, Palawan and Balabac
- D. p.salomonseni — Found on Northwest Luzon
- D. p.fugaense — Found on Calayan and Fuga

== Ecology and behavior ==
Often seen feeding around flowering and fruiting trees and mistletoes. Feeds on fruit, nectar and pollen. Forages in the canopy or high in the understory singly, in small groups or joins mixed-species flocks. Barely anything is known about its breeding habits. Fledgling seen in May. Birds in breeding condition with enlarged gonads collected from February to December.

== Habitat and conservation status ==
Its natural habitats at tropical moist lowland primary forest and secondary forest up to 2,000 meters above sea level but mostly seen below 1,000 meters above sea level.

The IUCN Red List has assessed this bird as least-concern species as it is common throughout its range and is found throughout the entire Philippines. Its population is still said to be decreasing due to deforestation in the Philippines due to land conversion, illegal logging and mining.
