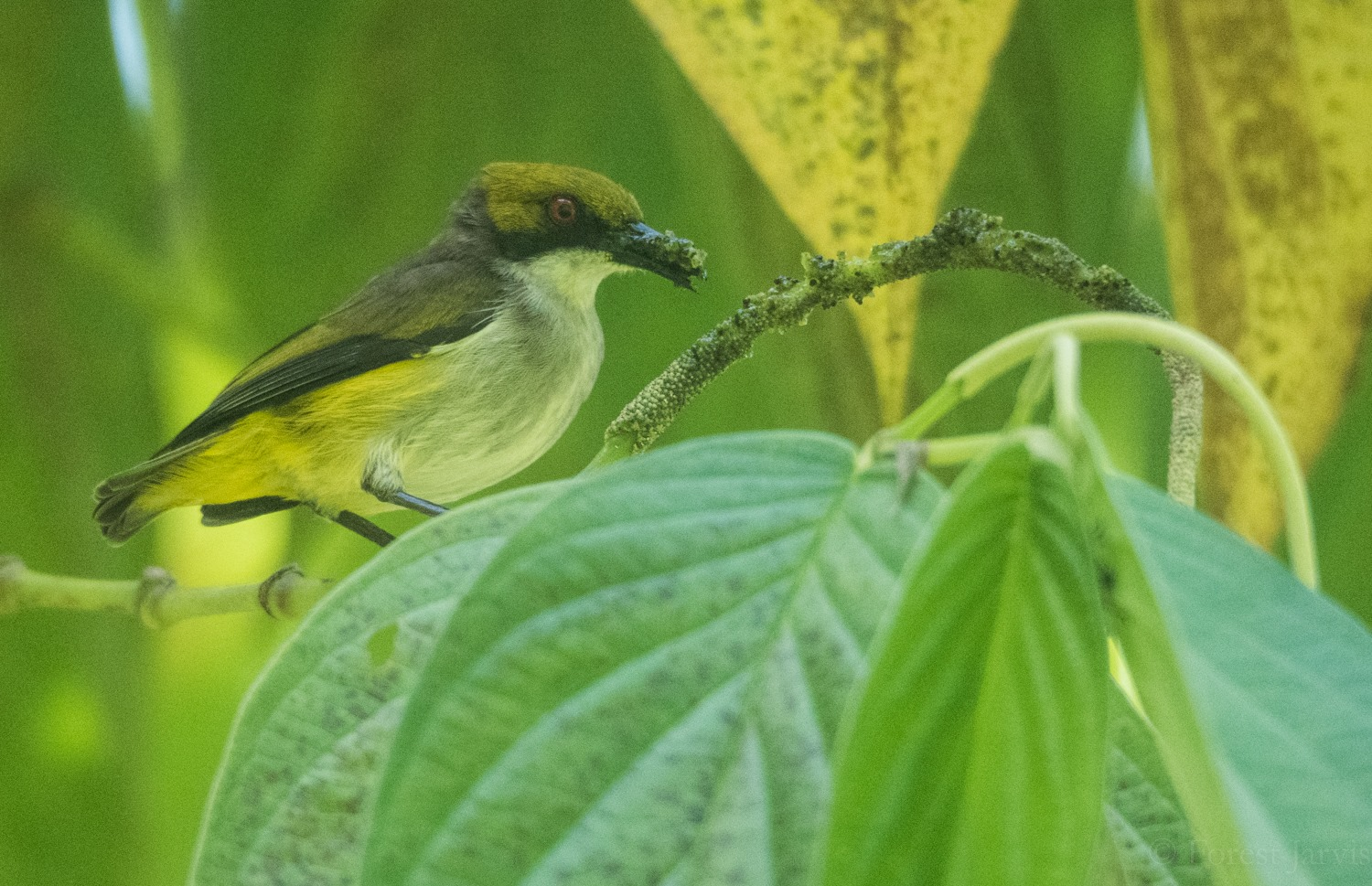
- Nominate subspecies seen in South Cotobato.

Conservation status
- Least Concern (IUCN 3.1)

Scientific classification
- Kingdom: Animalia
- Phylum: Chordata
- Class: Aves
- Order: Passeriformes
- Family: Dicaeidae
- Genus: Dicaeum
- Species: D. nigrilore

Binomial name
- Dicaeum nigrilore Hartert, 1904

= Olive-capped flowerpecker =

Species of bird

The olive-capped flowerpecker (Dicaeum nigrilore) is a species of bird in the family Dicaeidae. It is endemic to the island of Mindanao in the Philippines.Its natural habitat is tropical moist montane forest.

== Description and taxonomy ==
Often seen feeding on fruiting and flowering trees.

=== Subspecies ===
Two subspecies are recognized.

- Dicaeum nigrilore nigrilore found in West, Central and Southern Mindanao has a more visible yellow rump
- Dicaeum nigrilore diuatae found in Northeast Mindanao has an overall darker green and drabber color and a greenish yellow rump.

A possible third subspecies which has a yellowish-green head is found in Southeast Mindanao. Further study is needed on this potential subspecies.

== Ecology and behavior ==
Feeds on small fruits, the nectar of mistletoes and flowers. Found singly, in pairs or mixed species flocks with other flowerpeckers and small birds. Often observed near fruiting and flowering trees especially kamang-kamang (Heptapleurum ovoideum) Nesting has been recorded from May to September. Nest is made out of moss and other dried plant material and suspended by fibers from small twigs. Nest in September contained 2 chicks although average clutch size has yet to be quantified.

== Habitat and conservation status ==
It inhabits tropic moist sub-montane and montane forest above 900 masl.

IUCN has assessed this bird as a least-concern species. Despite a limited range, it is said to be locally common in its range. As it occurs in rugged and inaccessible mountains, this has allowed a large portion of its habitat to remain intact. However, there it is still affected by habitat loss through deforestation, mining, land conversion and slash-and-burn - just not to the same extent as lowland forest.
