= Sumatran flowerpecker =

Conservation status
- Least Concern (IUCN 3.1)

Scientific classification
- Kingdom: Animalia
- Phylum: Chordata
- Class: Aves
- Order: Passeriformes
- Family: Dicaeidae
- Genus: Dicaeum
- Species: D. beccarii

Binomial name
- Dicaeum beccarii Robinson & Kloss, 1916

Species of bird

The Sumatran flowerpecker (Dicaeum beccarii) is a species of bird in the family Dicaeidae that is found in montane Sumatra. It was formerly considered to be a subspecies of the fire-breasted flowerpecker (Dicaeum ignipectus).

== Taxonomy ==
The Sumatran flowerpecker was formally described in 1916 by the British zoologists Herbert C. Robinson and C. Boden Kloss based on three specimens that they had collected on Mount Kerinci on the island of Sumatra in Indonesia. They coined the binomial name Dicaeum beccarii. They chose the specific epithet to honour the Italian botanist and explorer Odoardo Beccari. The Sumatran flowerpecker was formerly considered to be a subspecies of the fire-breasted flowerpecker (Dicaeum ignipectus) but based on differences in plumage, it is now treated as a separate species. It is monotypic: no subspecies are recognised.
