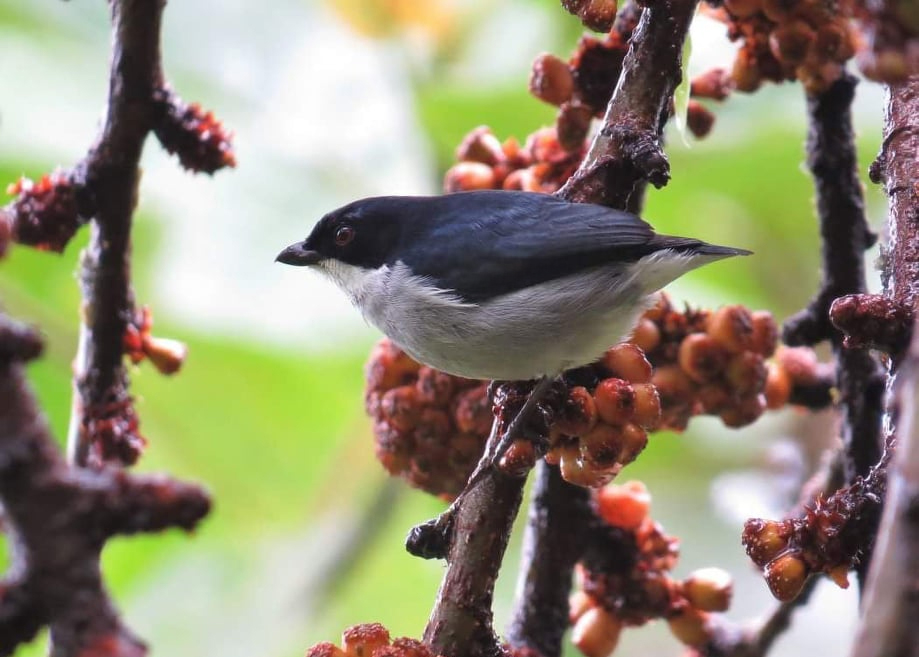
- Bicolored Flowerpecker (inexpectatum subspecies) feeding of figs in Quezon.

Conservation status
- Least Concern (IUCN 3.1)

Scientific classification
- Kingdom: Animalia
- Phylum: Chordata
- Class: Aves
- Order: Passeriformes
- Family: Dicaeidae
- Genus: Dicaeum
- Species: D. bicolor

Binomial name
- Dicaeum bicolor (Bourns & Worcester, 1894)

= Bicolored flowerpecker =

Species of bird

The bicolored flowerpecker (Dicaeum bicolor) is a species of bird in the family Dicaeidae. It is endemic to the Philippines.

== Description and taxonomy ==
This consists of three subspecies

- D. b. bicolor – Found on Leyte, Samar, Mindanao and Bohol
- D. b. inexpectatum – Found on Luzon, Mindoro and Catanduanes
- D. b. viridissimum – Found on Panay, Negros and Guimaras; No recent records on Guimaras

== Ecology and behavior ==
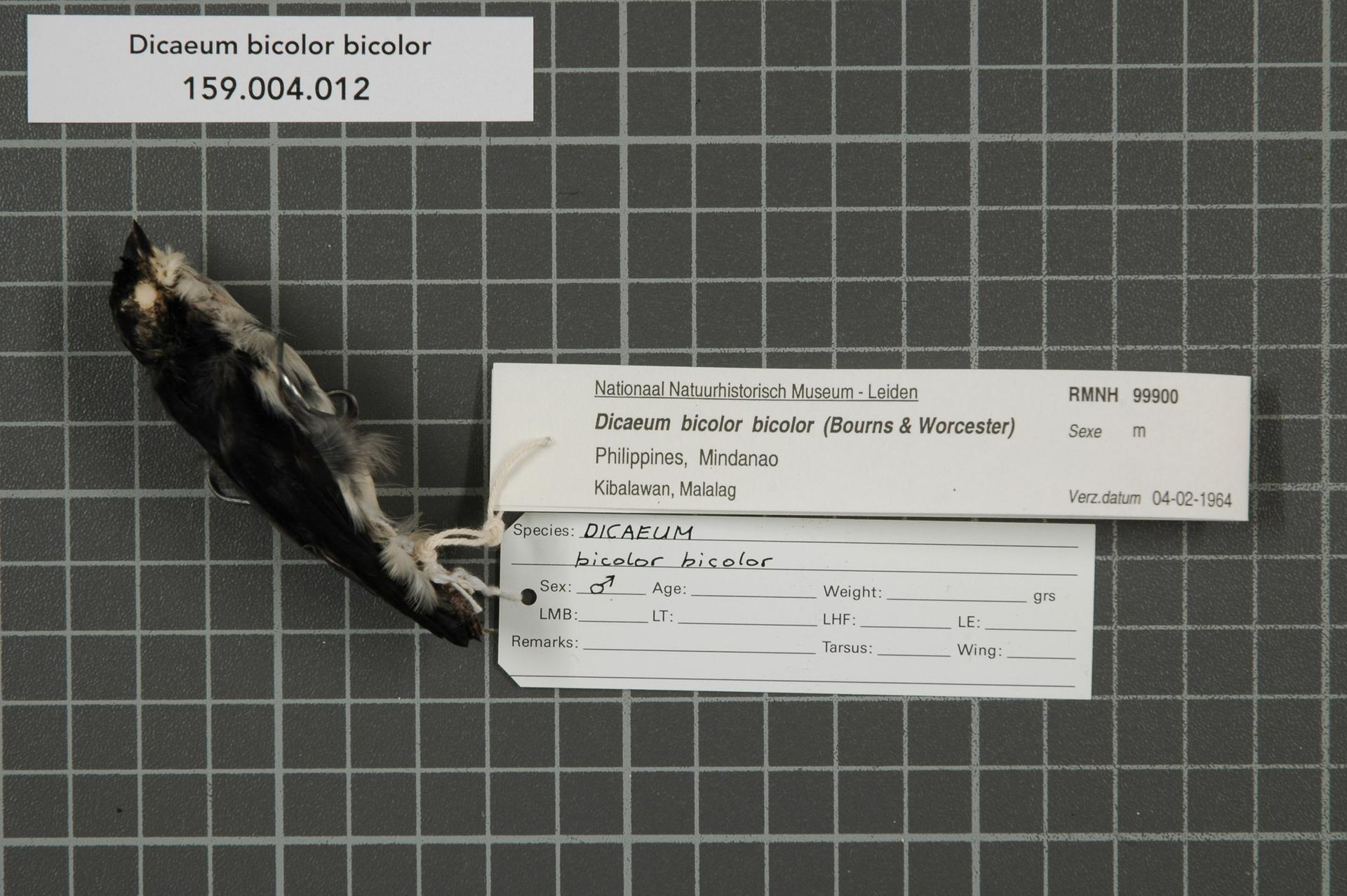
A skin of the bicolor sub-species.

Not much is known about its diet but it is pressumed to have the typical flowerpecker diet of small fruits, insects, nectar especially from mistletoes. Typically seen singly, pairs and small groups but joins mixed species flocks.

They often form mixed flocks with other flowerpecker species, white-eyes, sunbirds, fantails and other small forest birds.

== Habitat and conservation status ==
Its natural habitat is tropical moist lowland forest and more rarely on tropical moist montane forests of up to 2,250 meters above sea level.

The IUCN has classified the species as being of Least Concern, while uncommon, has a wide range. The population is believed to be stable. However, deforestation in the Philippines throughout the country due to slash and burn farming, mining, illegal logging and habitat conversion.

It is found in multiple protected areas such as Pasonanca Natural Park, Mount Banahaw, Mount Kitanglad. Mount Apo, Mount Pulag and Northern Sierra Madre Natural Park but like all areas in the Philippines, protection is lax and deforestation continues despite this protection on paper.
