= Golden-rumped flowerpecker =

Conservation status
- Least Concern (IUCN 3.1)

Scientific classification
- Kingdom: Animalia
- Phylum: Chordata
- Class: Aves
- Order: Passeriformes
- Family: Dicaeidae
- Genus: Dicaeum
- Species: D. annae

Binomial name
- Dicaeum annae (Büttikofer, 1894)

Species of bird

The golden-rumped flowerpecker (Dicaeum annae) is a species of bird in the family Dicaeidae. It is endemic to the Lesser Sunda Islands. This species was named in honour of Anna Weber-van Bosse.

Its natural habitat is subtropical or tropical moist lowland forest.
