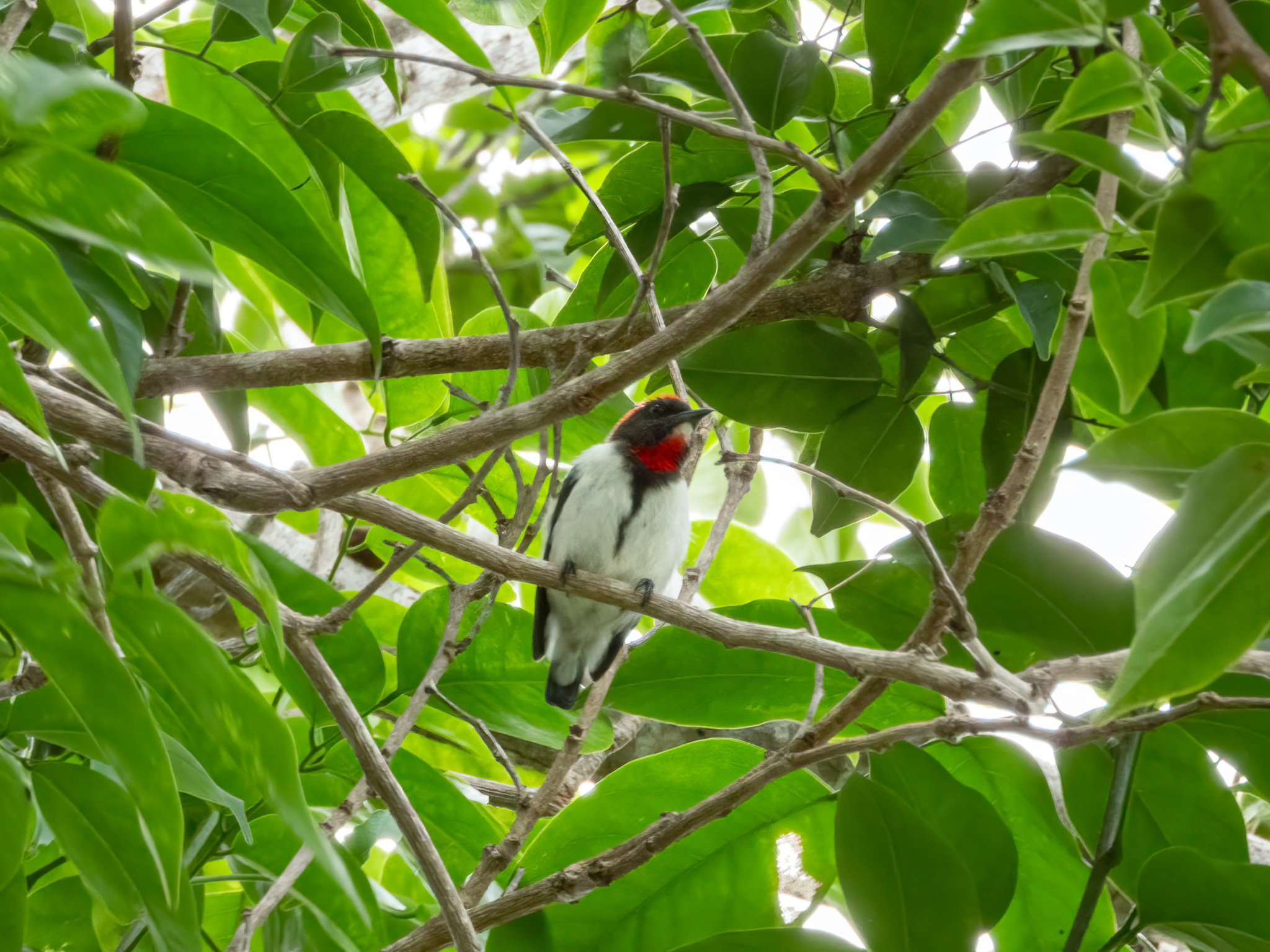

Conservation status
- Least Concern (IUCN 3.1)

Scientific classification
- Kingdom: Animalia
- Phylum: Chordata
- Class: Aves
- Order: Passeriformes
- Family: Dicaeidae
- Genus: Dicaeum
- Species: D. igniferum

Binomial name
- Dicaeum igniferum Wallace, 1864

= Black-fronted flowerpecker =

Species of bird

The black-fronted flowerpecker (Dicaeum igniferum) is a species of bird in the family Dicaeidae. It is endemic to the Lesser Sunda Islands in Indonesia. Its natural habitats are subtropical or tropical moist lowland forest and subtropical or tropical moist montane forest.
