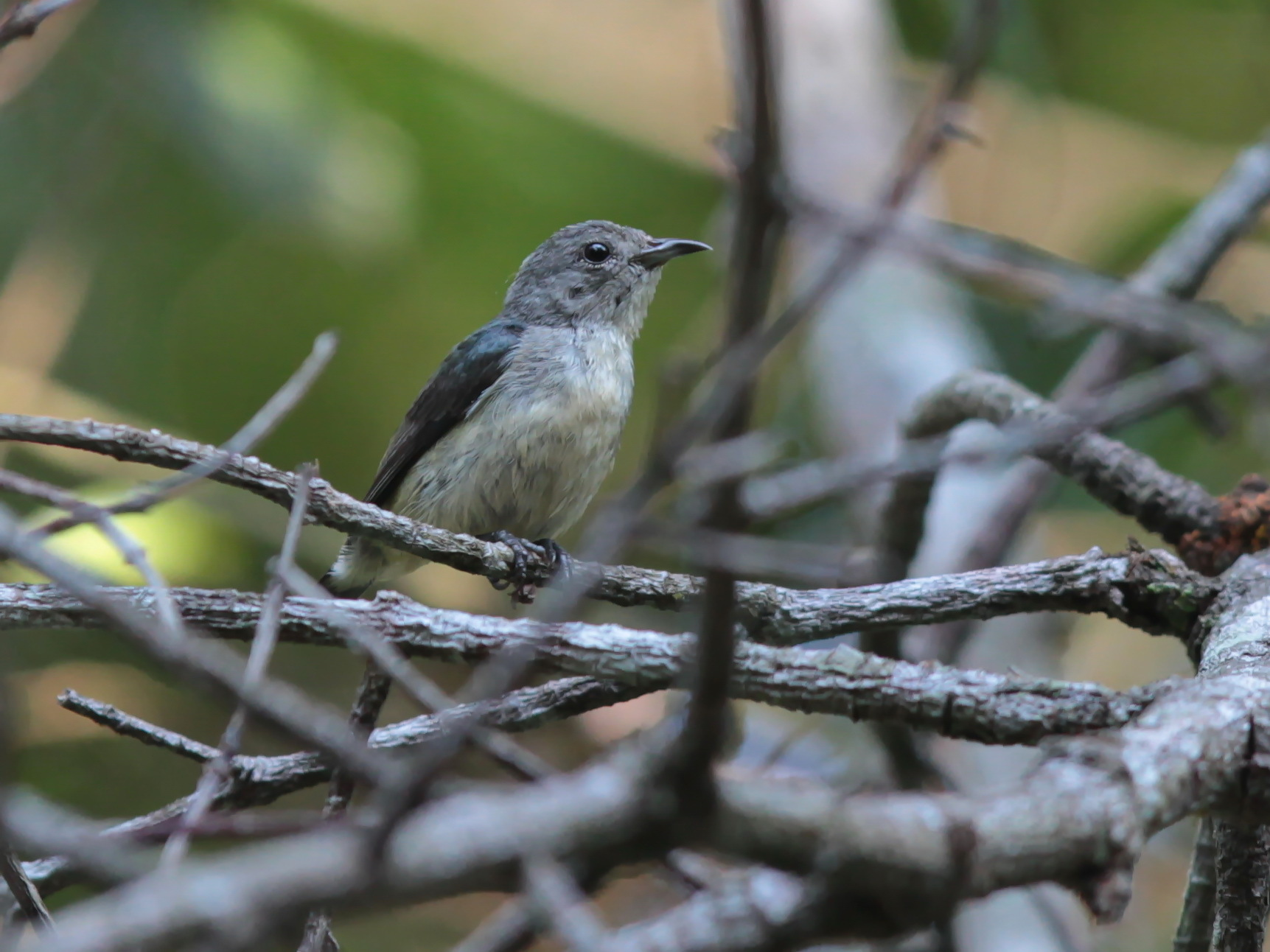

Conservation status
- Least Concern (IUCN 3.1)

Scientific classification
- Kingdom: Animalia
- Phylum: Chordata
- Class: Aves
- Order: Passeriformes
- Family: Dicaeidae
- Genus: Dicaeum
- Species: D. cambodianum

Binomial name
- Dicaeum cambodianum Delacour & Jabouille, 1928

= Cambodian flowerpecker =

Species of bird

The Cambodian flowerpecker (Dicaeum cambodianum) is a species of bird in the family Dicaeidae that is native to east Thailand and Cambodia. It was formerly considered to be a subspecies of the fire-breasted flowerpecker (Dicaeum ignipectus).

== Taxonomy ==
The Cambodian flowerpecker was formally described in 1928 by the French ornithologists Jean Théodore Delacour and Pierre Jabouille based on a specimen collected at Bokor in southern Cambodia. They coined the trinomial name Dicaenum beccarii cambodianum. The Cambodian flowerpecker was formerly considered to be a subspecies of the fire-breasted flowerpecker (Dicaeum ignipectus) but based on differences in plumage, it is now treated as a separate species. It is monotypic: no subspecies are recognised.
