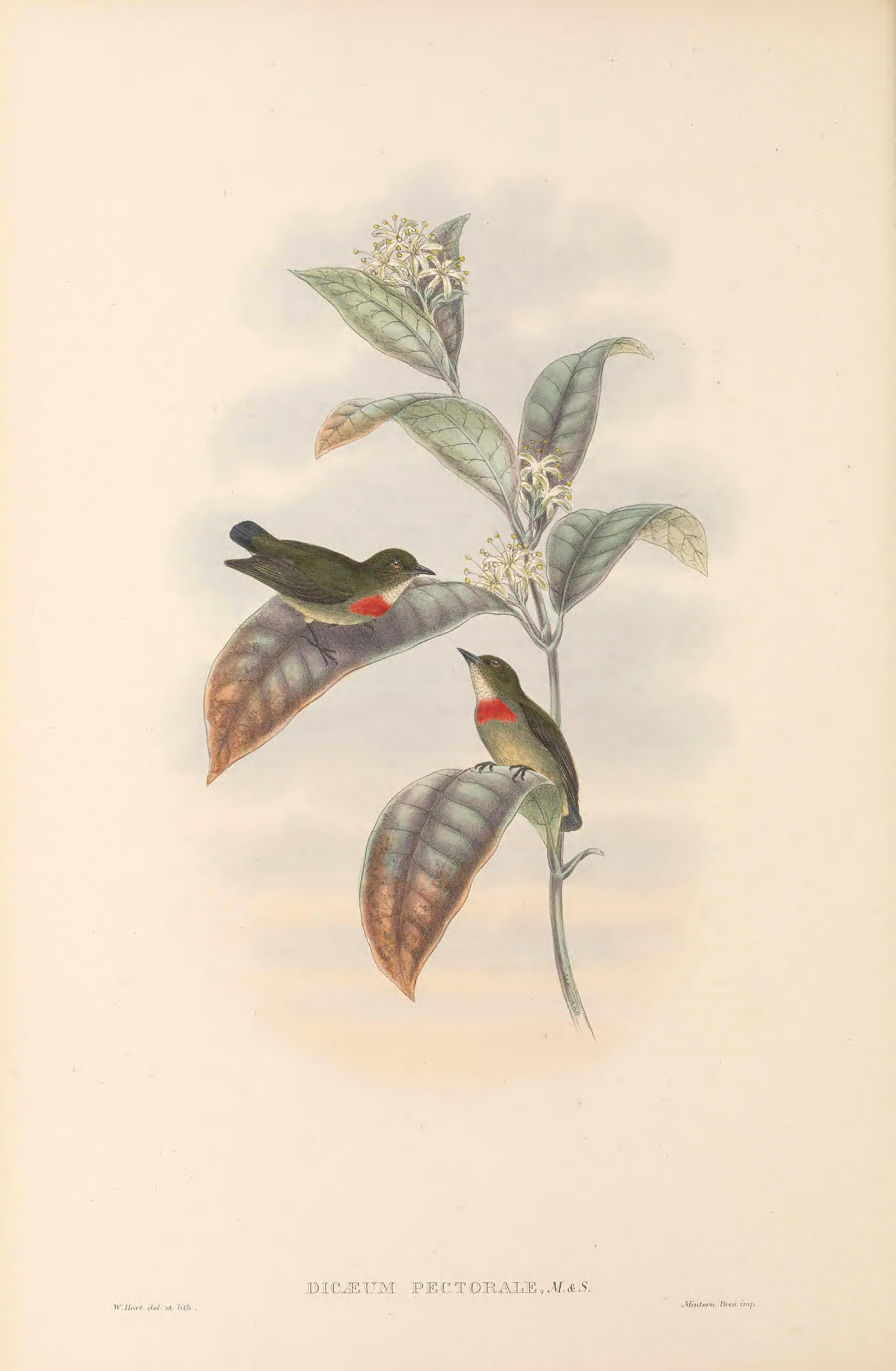

Conservation status
- Least Concern (IUCN 3.1)

Scientific classification
- Kingdom: Animalia
- Phylum: Chordata
- Class: Aves
- Order: Passeriformes
- Family: Dicaeidae
- Genus: Dicaeum
- Species: D. pectorale

Binomial name
- Dicaeum pectorale Müller, 1843

= Olive-crowned flowerpecker =

Species of bird

The olive-crowned flowerpecker (Dicaeum pectorale) is a small passerine bird in the flowerpecker family, Dicaeidae. It is found in far western New Guinea and on adjacent islands.

It is a small bird, with males having olive upperparts, greyish-green underparts, a white throat and a scarlet breast patch. Females are similar to males, but lack the scarlet breast patch. It is mainly frugivorous, also supplementally feeding on spiders.

== Taxonomy and systematics ==
The olive-crowned flowerpecker is one of 41 species in the genus Dicaeum. It is sometimes considered to be conspecific with the red-capped flowerpecker, Louisiade flowerpecker, or the Halmahera flowerpecker.

The olive-crowned flowerpecker was first described by Saloman Müller in 1843. The generic name Dicaeum is from the Greek δικαιον (dikaion), most likely referring to the scarab beetle, while the specific epithet pectorale is from the Latin pectoralis (of the breast).

=== Subspecies ===
There are two recognised subspecies of the olive-crowned flowerpecker:

- D. p. pectorale – Müller, 1843 : The nominate subspecies, it is found in northwestern New Guinea and on Waigeo, Batanta, Salawati, and Misool.
- D. p. ignotus – Mees, 1964: Found on Gebe Island. It has more olive upperparts and slightly larger wings and bill than the nominate.

== Description ==
The olive-crowned flowerpecker is a small bird, 9 cm (3.5 in) in length and weighing 7–7.8 g (0.25–0.28 oz). Nominate males have olive green upperparts and crown, yellowish rumps, grey-green underparts, yellowish-white central abdomen and undertail coverts, white throats, and a large scarlet patch on breast. Females are similar to males, but lack the scarlet throat patch and have yellower center of abdomen and undertail coverts. Juveniles are similar to females, but have more olive underparts.

Vocalisations include a short, insect-like buzzing note, a single, high upslurred note, and a drawn-out chew, repeated at intervals.

== Distribution and habitat ==
The olive-headed flowerpecker is found throughout lowlands in western New Guinea and on nearby islands. It inhabits forest canopy up to altitudes of 1,500 m (4,900 ft), although it can be found up to altitudes of 2,350 m (7,710 ft). It is common to uncommon throughout its range.

== Behaviour and ecology ==
=== Diet ===
Like other flowerpeckers, the olive-headed flowerpecker feed mainly on fruit, especially figs and mistletoe. It also supplements its diet with spiders. Foraging is done in the canopy, either alone or in pairs.
