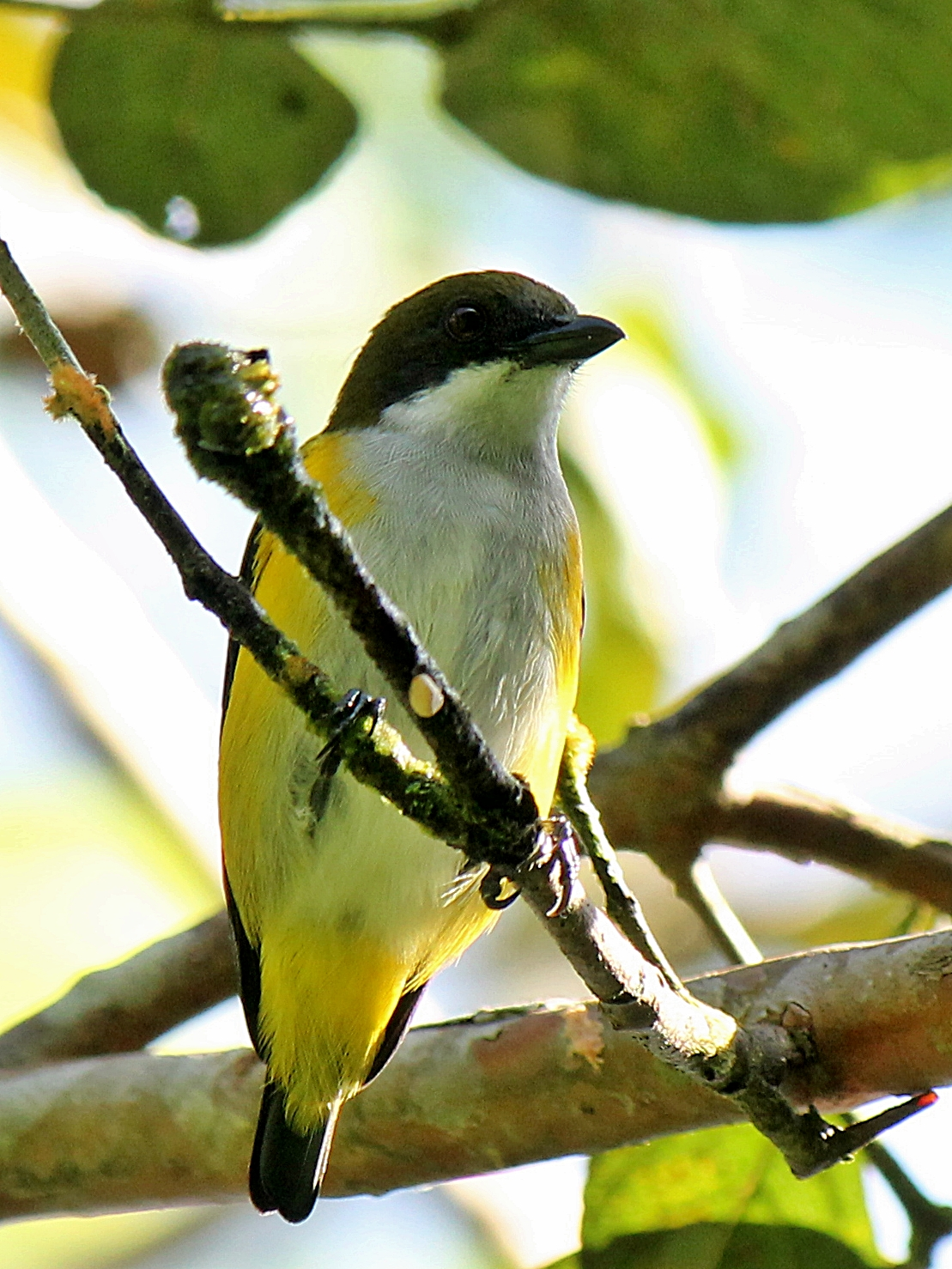

Conservation status
- Least Concern (IUCN 3.1)

Scientific classification
- Kingdom: Animalia
- Phylum: Chordata
- Class: Aves
- Order: Passeriformes
- Family: Dicaeidae
- Genus: Dicaeum
- Species: D. aureolimbatum

Binomial name
- Dicaeum aureolimbatum (Wallace, 1865)

= Yellow-sided flowerpecker =

Species of bird

The yellow-sided flowerpecker (Dicaeum aureolimbatum) is a species of bird in the family Dicaeidae. It is endemic to Sulawesi and adjacent islands in Indonesia.

Its natural habitats are subtropical or tropical moist lowland forest and subtropical or tropical moist montane forest.

== Gallery ==
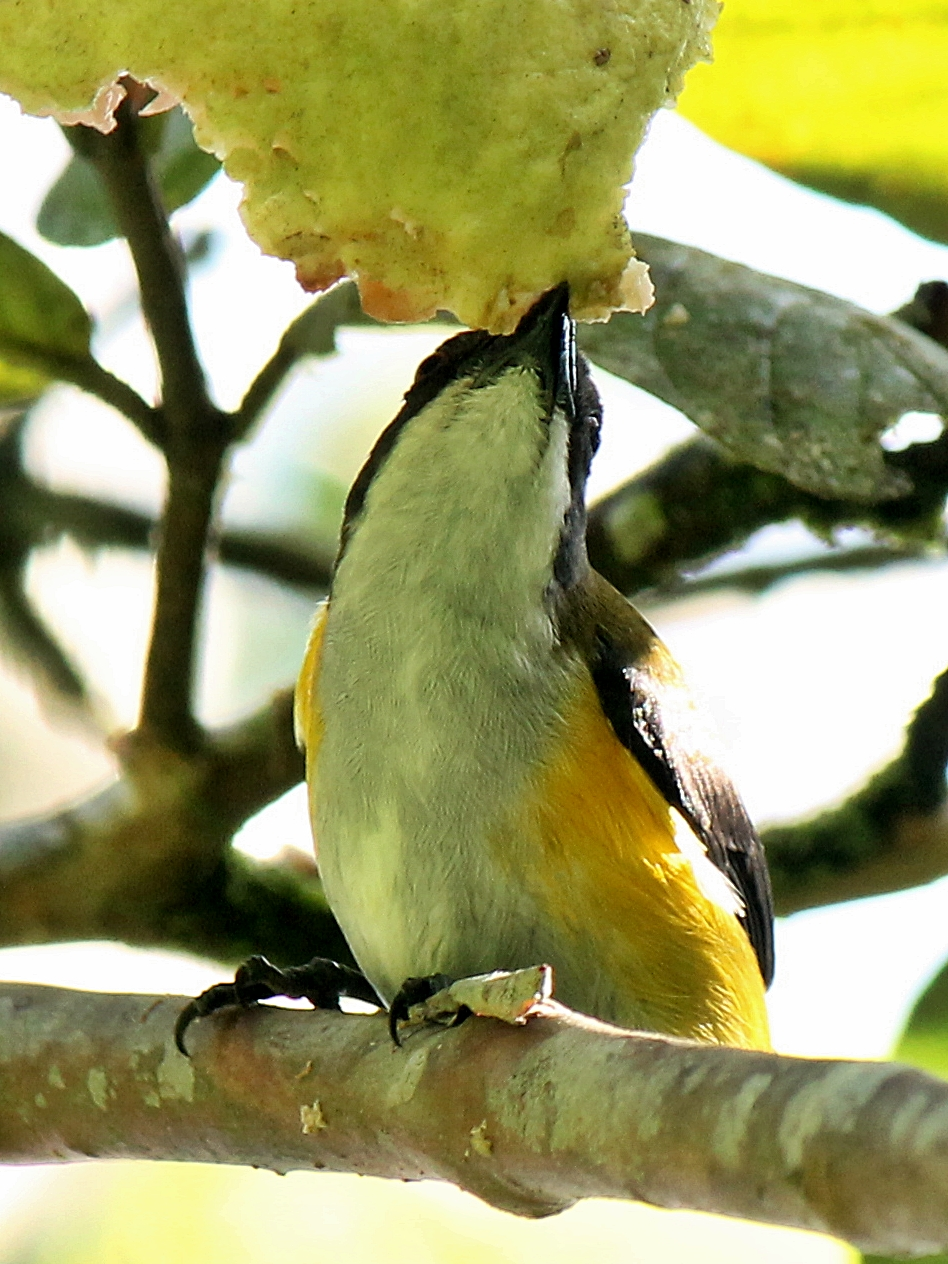
at Warembungan, North Sulawesi

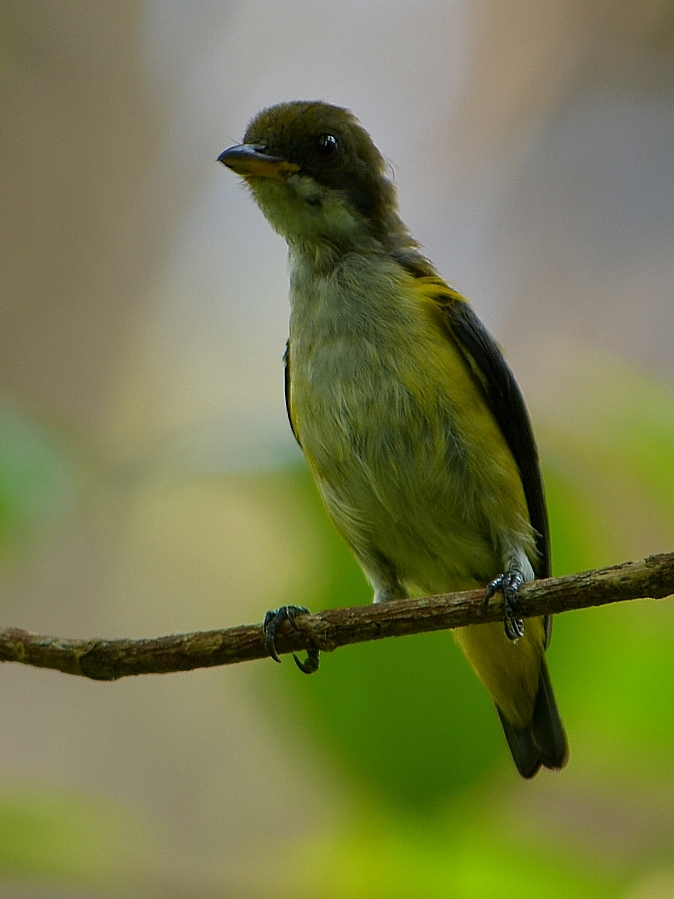
juvenile
