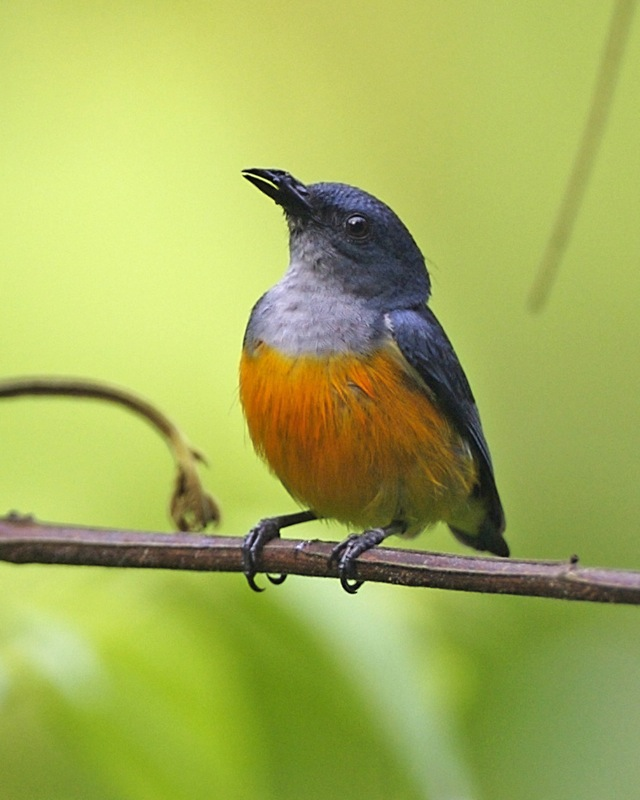
- Orange-bellied flowerpecker (Dicaeum trigonostigma)

Scientific classification
- Kingdom: Animalia
- Phylum: Chordata
- Class: Aves
- Order: Passeriformes
- Parvorder: Passerida
- Family: Dicaeidae; Bonaparte, 1853

Genera
- Dicaeum; Prionochilus; Pachyglossa

= Flowerpecker =

Flowerpeckers

Family of birds

The flowerpeckers are a family, Dicaeidae, of passerine birds. The family comprises three genera, Dicaeum, Prionochilus, and Pachyglossa, with 56 species in total. The family has sometimes been included in an enlarged sunbird family Nectariniidae. The berrypeckers of the family Melanocharitidae and the painted berrypeckers, Paramythiidae, were once lumped into this family as well. The family is distributed through tropical southern Asia and Australasia from India east to the Philippines and south to Australia. The family has a wide range occupying a wide range of environments from sea level to montane habitats. Some species, such as the mistletoebird of Australia, are recorded as being highly nomadic over parts of their range.

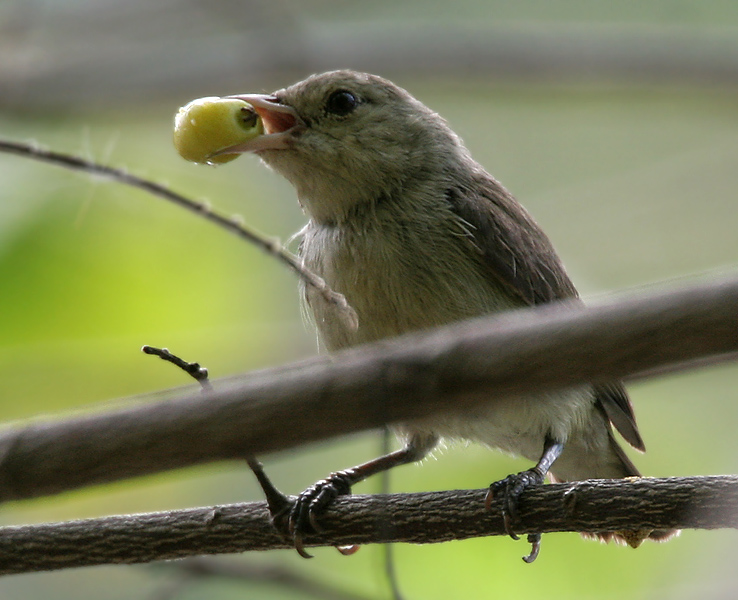
Pale-billed flowerpecker feeding on Muntingia calabura

There is little variation in structure between species in the family although many have distinctive and colourful plumage. Flowerpeckers are stout birds, with short necks and legs. These are small birds ranging from the 10 cm (3.9 in) and 5.7 g (0.20 oz) pygmy flowerpecker to the 18 cm (7.1 in) and 12 g (0.42 oz) mottled flowerpecker. Flowerpeckers have short tails, short thick curved bills and tubular tongues. The latter features reflect the importance of nectar in the diet of many species. They also have digestive systems that have evolved to deal efficiently with mistletoe berries. They are often dull in colour, although in several species the males have brightly patterned crimson or glossy-black plumage.

The tongue tip is feathery in many species such as Dicaeum nigrilore

Nectar forms part of the diet, although they also take berries, spiders and insects. Mistletoes of 21 species in 12 genera have been found to be part of the diet of flowerpeckers, and it is thought that all species have adaptations to eat these berries and dispose of them quickly. Flowerpeckers may occur in mixed-species feeding flocks with sunbirds and white-eyes, as well as other species of flowerpecker.

The breeding biology of the flowerpeckers has been little studied. In the species where data has been collected they apparently form monogamous pairs for breeding, but the division of labour varies; in scarlet-breasted flowerpeckers both parents participate in all aspects of nest building, incubation and chick rearing, but in the mistletoebird the female undertakes the first two tasks alone. Flowerpeckers lay 1–4 eggs, typically in a purse-like nest of plant fibres, suspended from a small tree or shrub. Recorded incubation times are scarce, but range from 10–12 days, with fledging occurring after 15 days.

The three genera in the family are separated on the basis of the length of the outermost primary which is elongated in Prionochilus and reduced in most Dicaeum species although D. melanozanthum is an exception with an elongated outer primary. Molecular phylogeny studies, however, suggest that some Dicaeum are closer to species traditionally in Prionochilus and that generic placements across the family may need to be revised.

The majority of flowerpeckers are resilient in their habits and are not threatened by human activities. Five species are considered to be near threatened by the IUCN, two are listed as vulnerable and one, the Cebu flowerpecker, is listed as critically endangered. The status of the enigmatic spectacled flowerpecker is unknown. Habitat loss is the cause of the declines of these species.

== Species ==
Image	Genus	Living species
	Prionochilus Strickland, 1841	Yellow-breasted flowerpecker, Prionochilus maculatus; Crimson-breasted flowerpecker, Prionochilus percussus; Palawan flowerpecker, Prionochilus plateni; Scarlet-breasted flowerpecker, Prionochilus thoracicus; Yellow-rumped flowerpecker, Prionochilus xanthopygius
	Pachyglossa Blyth, 1843	Olive-backed flowerpecker, Pachyglossa olivacea; Whiskered flowerpecker, Pachyglossa propria; Yellow-vented flowerpecker, Pachyglossa chrysorrhea; Yellow-bellied flowerpecker, Pachyglossa melanozantha; Legge's flowerpecker, Pachyglossa vincens; Brown-backed flowerpecker, Pachyglossa everetti; Thick-billed flowerpecker, Pachyglossa agilis
	Dicaeum Cuvier, 1816	Spectacled flowerpecker, Dicaeum dayakorum; Golden-rumped flowerpecker, Dicaeum annae; Yellow-sided flowerpecker, Dicaeum aureolimbatum; Olive-capped flowerpecker, Dicaeum nigrilore; Yellow-crowned flowerpecker, Dicaeum anthonyi; Flame-crowned flowerpecker, Dicaeum kampalili; Bicolored flowerpecker, Dicaeum bicolor; Red-keeled flowerpecker, Dicaeum australe; Black-belted flowerpecker, Dicaeum haematostictum; Scarlet-collared flowerpecker, Dicaeum retrocinctum; Cebu flowerpecker, Dicaeum quadricolor; Orange-bellied flowerpecker, Dicaeum trigonostigma; Buzzing flowerpecker, Dicaeum hypoleucum; Pale-billed flowerpecker, Dicaeum erythrorhynchos; Nilgiri flowerpecker, Dicaeum concolor; Plain flowerpecker, Dicaeum minullum; Andaman flowerpecker, Dicaeum virescens; Pygmy flowerpecker, Dicaeum pygmaeum; Crimson-crowned flowerpecker, Dicaeum nehrkorni; Buru flowerpecker, Dicaeum erythrothorax; Halmahera flowerpecker, Dicaeum schistaceiceps; Ashy flowerpecker, Dicaeum vulneratum; Olive-crowned flowerpecker, Dicaeum pectorale; Red-capped flowerpecker, Dicaeum geelvinkianum; Louisiade flowerpecker, Dicaeum nitidum; Red-banded flowerpecker, Dicaeum eximium; Midget flowerpecker, Dicaeum aeneum; Mottled flowerpecker, Dicaeum tristrami; Black-fronted flowerpecker, Dicaeum igniferum; Red-chested flowerpecker, Dicaeum maugei; Pink-breasted flowerpecker, Dicaeum keiense; Mistletoebird, Dicaeum hirundinaceum; Grey-sided flowerpecker, Dicaeum celebicum; Black-sided flowerpecker, Dicaeum monticolum; Fire-breasted flowerpecker, Dicaeum ignipectus; Cambodian flowerpecker, Dicaeum cambodianum; Sumatran flowerpecker, Dicaeum beccarii; Fire-throated flowerpecker, Dicaeum luzoniense; Javan flowerpecker, Dicaeum sanguinolentum; Flores flowerpecker, Dicaeum rhodopygiale; Sumba flowerpecker, Dicaeum wilhelminae; Timor flowerpecker, Dicaeum hanieli; Scarlet-backed flowerpecker, Dicaeum cruentatum; Scarlet-headed flowerpecker, Dicaeum trochileum
