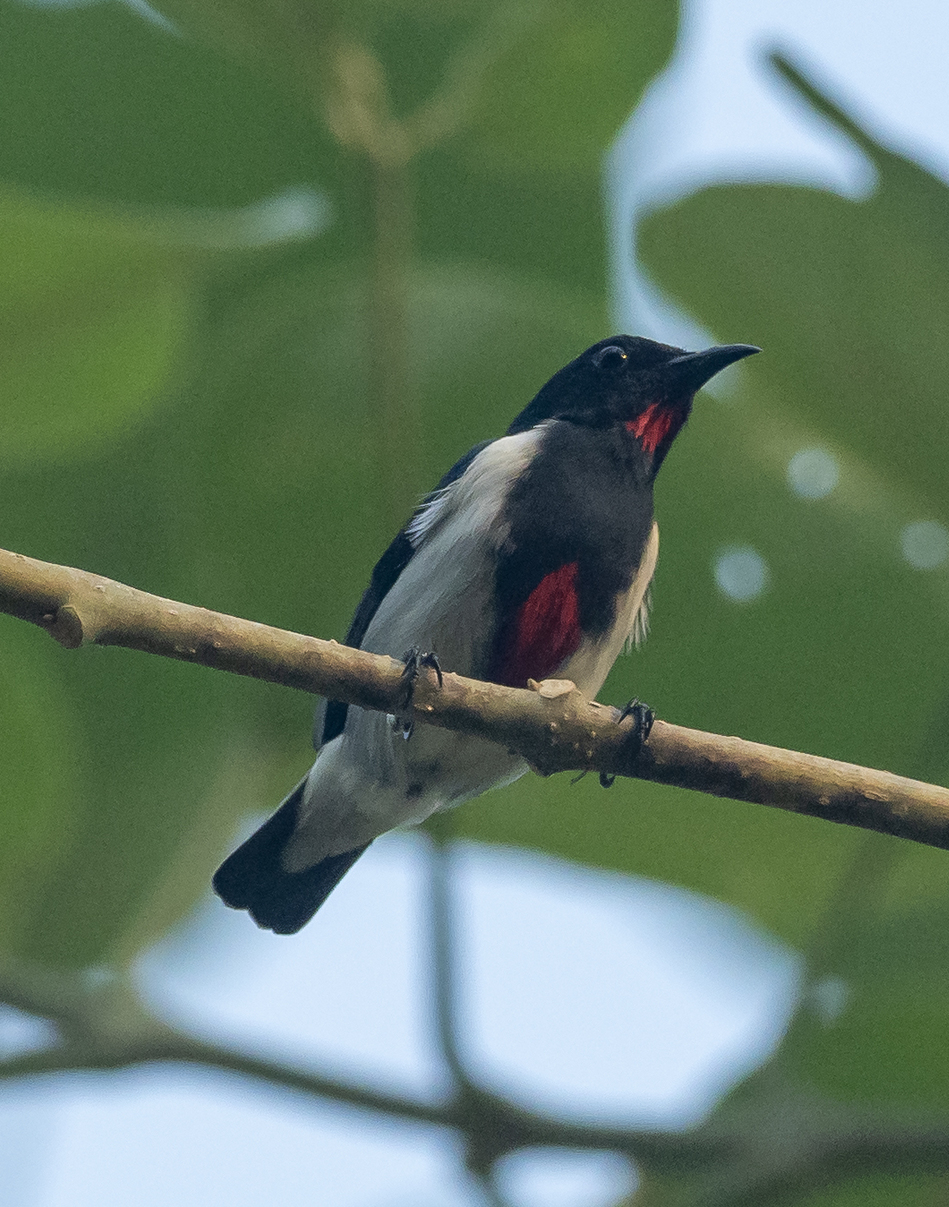

Conservation status
- Near Threatened (IUCN 3.1)

Scientific classification
- Kingdom: Animalia
- Phylum: Chordata
- Class: Aves
- Order: Passeriformes
- Family: Dicaeidae
- Genus: Dicaeum
- Species: D. retrocinctum

Binomial name
- Dicaeum retrocinctum Gould, 1872

= Scarlet-collared flowerpecker =

Species of bird

The scarlet-collared flowerpecker (Dicaeum retrocinctum) is a species of bird in the family Dicaeidae, about 10cm long and is endemic to the Philippines where it found only in the tropical moist lowland forests in Mindoro, usually occurring below 1000m in the canopy and edge of the forest and in open country with scattered trees. Along with the critically endangered Cebu flowerpecker, it is one of the two threatened flowerpeckers in the Philippines and is declining primarily due to habitat loss.

== Description and taxonomy ==
This species is a small bird found in the lowland and foothill forest of Mindoro. It has a black back, head and chest with white on the sides of the belly, chest and vent. It has a red patch on its throat, center of its chest down to the belly and collar. Relative to other flowerpeckers it has a longer curved beak.

Its call is described as high pitched stacatto song that sounds like two pebbles struck together.

It is closely related to the red-keeled flowerpecker (Dicaeum australe) but has a longer, more slender curved beak.

== Ecology and behavior ==
It is seen feeding on flowering and fruiting trees.

Nests have been found in April. Birds in breeding condition recorded from February to June. Immature birds seen as late as September.

== Habitat and conservation status ==
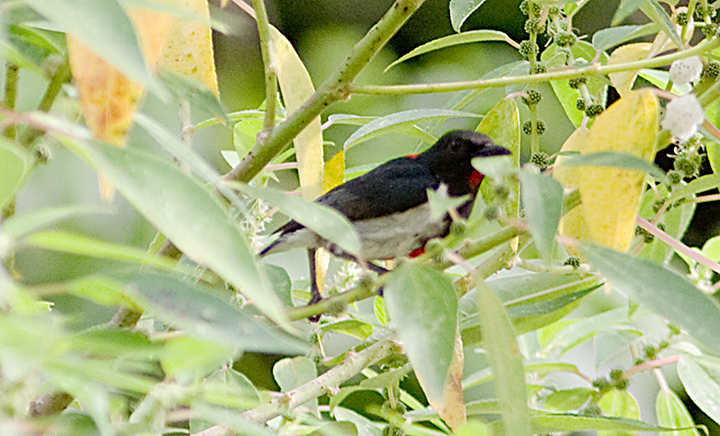
A Scarlett-collared flowerpecker feeding on berries

It inhabits tropical moist lowland forest up to 1,000 meters above sea level. It prefers primary forest and secondary forest but has been known to visit cultivations and coconut plantations

IUCN previously assessed this bird as vulnerable with its population being estimated as 6,000 to 15,000 mature individuals. In 2024, it was re-assessed as a Near-threatened species with estimates of 40,000 to 160,000 mature individuals. This increased population estimate and downlisting does not mean that this species is increasing but rather reflects new data that this species occurs in higher densities than originally believed. This species is still declining. Forest loss is a threat especially in its lower altitude limits which are more prone to legal and illegal logging, mining and conversion into farmland.

It occurs on a few protected areas Mt Siburan (Important Bird Area) and Mt. Iglit-baco National Park (which is the stronghold of the Tamaraw)..

Conservation actions proposed include to establish formal, managed protected areas to conserve remnant forest at Malpalon and Puerto Galera. Extend Mt Iglit-Baco National Park to encompass remaining lowland forest tracts. Devise and implement a management plan for the forest at Mt. Siburan with a focus on biodiversity conservation
