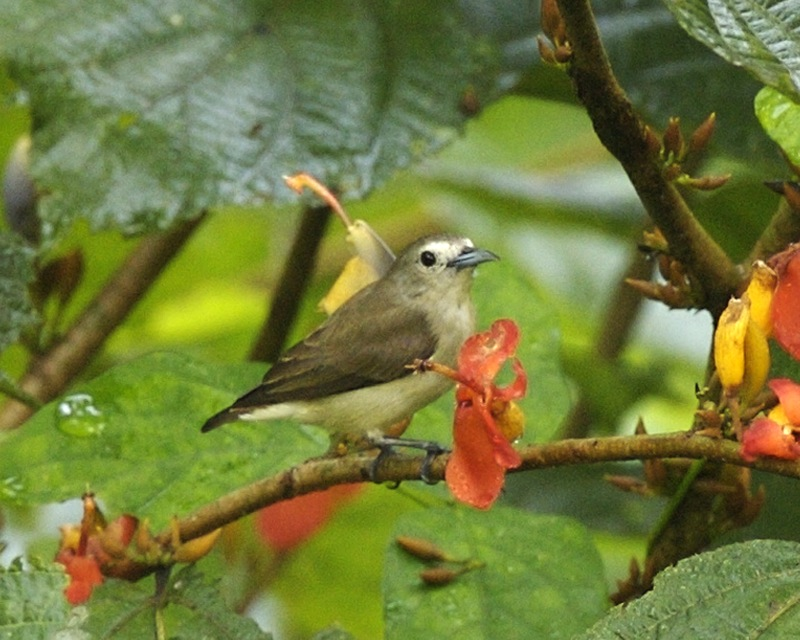
- Nilgiri flycatcher (Dicaeum concolor)

Scientific classification
- Kingdom: Animalia
- Phylum: Chordata
- Class: Aves
- Order: Passeriformes
- Family: Dicaeidae
- Genus: Dicaeum; Cuvier, 1816

Type species
- Certhia erythronotus = Certhia cruentata Latham, 1790

Species
- see text

= Dicaeum =

Genus of birds

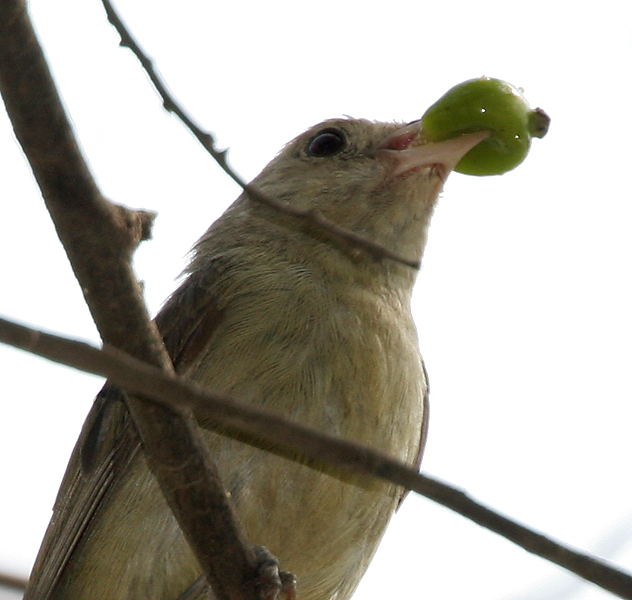
Pale-billed flowerpecker Dicaeum erythrorhynchos with a Muntingia calabura berry (Hyderabad, India)

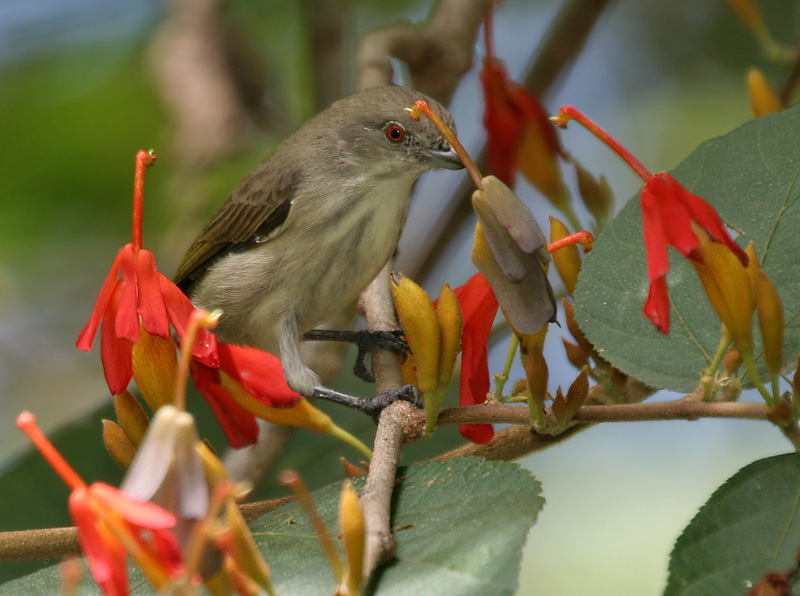
Thick-billed flowerpecker Dicaeum agile on Helicteres isora

Dicaeum is a genus of birds in the flowerpecker family Dicaeidae, a group of passerines tropical southern Asia and Australasia from India east to the Philippines and south to Australia. Within the family Dicaeidae the genus Dicaeum is sister to a clade containing the genera Prionochilus and Pachyglossa.

Its members are very small, stout, often brightly coloured birds, 10 to 18 cm (3.9 to 7.1 in) in length, with short tails, short, thick curved bills and tubular tongues. The latter features reflect the importance of nectar in the diet of many species, although berries, spiders and insects are also taken.

2–4 eggs are laid, typically in a purse-like nest suspended from a tree.

== Taxonomy ==
The genus Dicaeum was introduced by the French naturalist Georges Cuvier in 1816. The name is from the Ancient Greek dikaion. Cuvier claimed that this was a word for a very small Indian bird mentioned by the Roman author Claudius Aelianus but the word probably referred instead to the scarab beetle Scarabaeus sacer. The type species was designated as the scarlet-backed flowerpecker by George Robert Gray in 1840.

The genus contains the following 44 species:

Image	Common name	Scientific name	Distribution
	Spectacled flowerpecker	Dicaeum dayakorum	Borneo
	Golden-rumped flowerpecker	Dicaeum annae	Lesser Sundas
	Yellow-sided flowerpecker	Dicaeum aureolimbatum	Sulawesi
	Olive-capped flowerpecker	Dicaeum nigrilore	montane Mindanao
	Yellow-crowned flowerpecker	Dicaeum anthonyi	montane northern Luzon
	Flame-crowned flowerpecker	Dicaeum kampalili	montane Mindanao
	Bicolored flowerpecker	Dicaeum bicolor	Philippines
	Red-keeled flowerpecker	Dicaeum australe	Philippines
	Black-belted flowerpecker	Dicaeum haematostictum	Western Visayas
	Scarlet-collared flowerpecker	Dicaeum retrocinctum	Mindoro
	Cebu flowerpecker	Dicaeum quadricolor	Cebu
	Orange-bellied flowerpecker	Dicaeum trigonostigma	Southeast Asia
	Buzzing flowerpecker	Dicaeum hypoleucum	Philippines
	Pale-billed flowerpecker	Dicaeum erythrorhynchos	South Asia
	Nilgiri flowerpecker	Dicaeum concolor	Western Ghats
	Plain flowerpecker	Dicaeum minullum	Northeast India, southern China and Southeast Asia
	Andaman flowerpecker	Dicaeum virescens	Andaman Islands
	Pygmy flowerpecker	Dicaeum pygmaeum	Philippines
	Crimson-crowned flowerpecker	Dicaeum nehrkorni	montane Sulawesi
	Buru flowerpecker	Dicaeum erythrothorax	Buru
	Halmahera flowerpecker	Dicaeum schistaceiceps	northern Moluccas
	Ashy flowerpecker	Dicaeum vulneratum	east-central Moluccas
	Olive-crowned flowerpecker	Dicaeum pectorale	Raja Ampat Islands and northwest New-Guinea
	Red-capped flowerpecker	Dicaeum geelvinkianum	New Guinea and satellites
	Louisiade flowerpecker	Dicaeum nitidum	Louisiade archipelago
	Red-banded flowerpecker	Dicaeum eximium	eastern Bismarck archipelago
	Midget flowerpecker	Dicaeum aeneum	Solomon Islands
	Mottled flowerpecker	Dicaeum tristrami	Makira
	Black-fronted flowerpecker	Dicaeum igniferum	Lesser Sundas
	Red-chested flowerpecker	Dicaeum maugei	Selayar Islands and eastern Lesser Sundas
	Pink-breasted flowerpecker	Dicaeum keiense	southern Moluccas
	Mistletoebird	Dicaeum hirundinaceum	Aru Islands and Australia
	Grey-sided flowerpecker	Dicaeum celebicum	Sulawesi
	Black-sided flowerpecker	Dicaeum monticolum	montane Borneo
	Fire-breasted flowerpecker	Dicaeum ignipectus	Himalayas, southern China, Taiwan and Indochina
	Cambodian flowerpecker	Dicaeum cambodianum	eastern Thailand and Cambodia
	Sumatran flowerpecker	Dicaeum beccarii	Bukit Barisan
	Fire-throated flowerpecker	Dicaeum luzoniense	Philippines
	Javan flowerpecker	Dicaeum sanguinolentum	montane Java and Bali
	Flores flowerpecker	Dicaeum rhodopygiale	Flores
	Sumba flowerpecker	Dicaeum wilhelminae	Sumba
	Timor flowerpecker	Dicaeum hanieli	Timor
	Scarlet-backed flowerpecker	Dicaeum cruentatum	southern China and Southeast Asia
	Scarlet-headed flowerpecker	Dicaeum trochileum	Bangka Island, southern Sumatra/Borneo and Java
