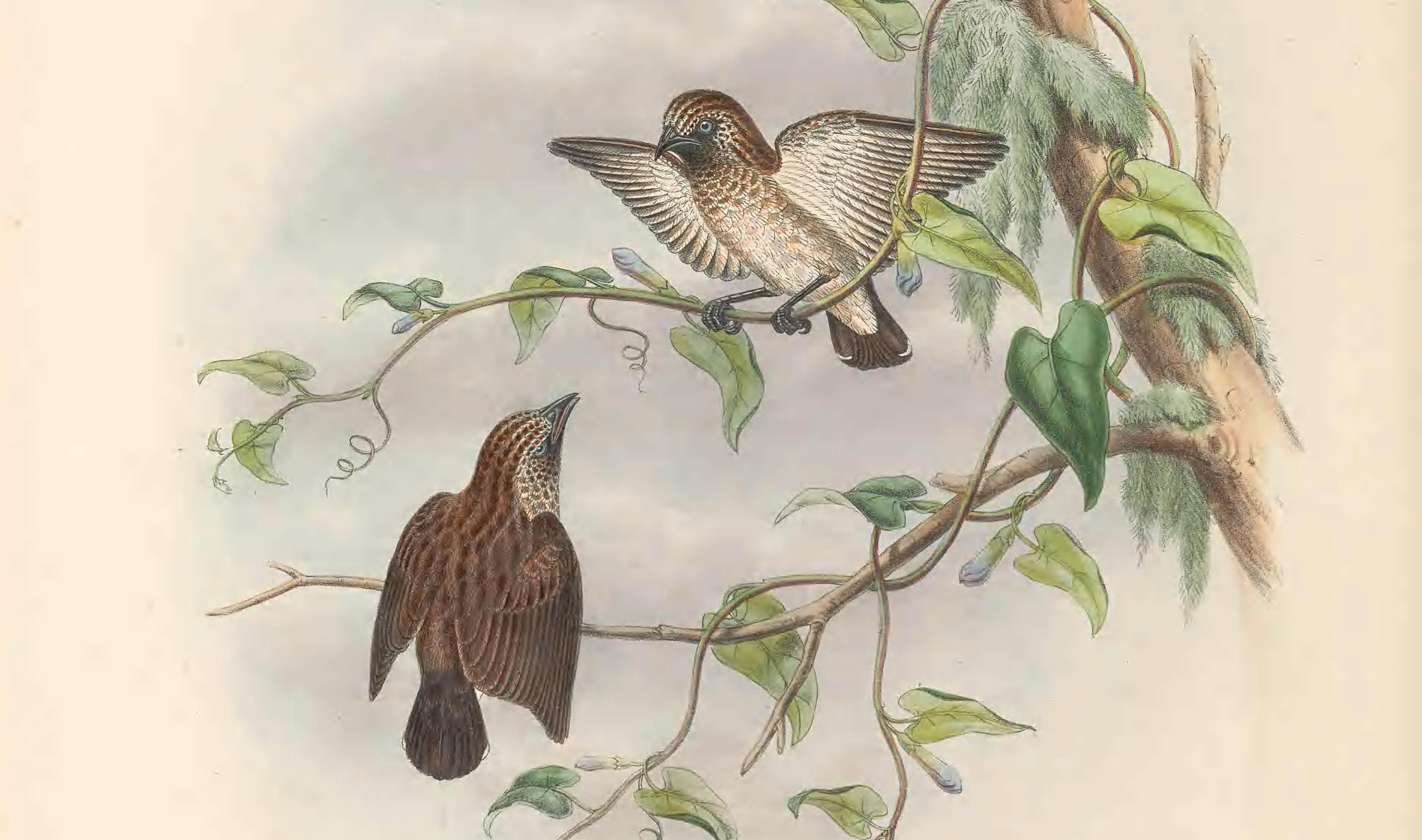

Conservation status
- Least Concern (IUCN 3.1)

Scientific classification
- Kingdom: Animalia
- Phylum: Chordata
- Class: Aves
- Order: Passeriformes
- Family: Dicaeidae
- Genus: Dicaeum
- Species: D. tristrami

Binomial name
- Dicaeum tristrami Sharpe, 1884

= Mottled flowerpecker =

Species of bird

The mottled flowerpecker or white-mottled flowerpecker (Dicaeum tristrami) is a species of bird in the family Dicaeidae. It is endemic to Makira in the Solomon Islands. It inhabits primary forest and secondary growth, most commonly in the mountains.
