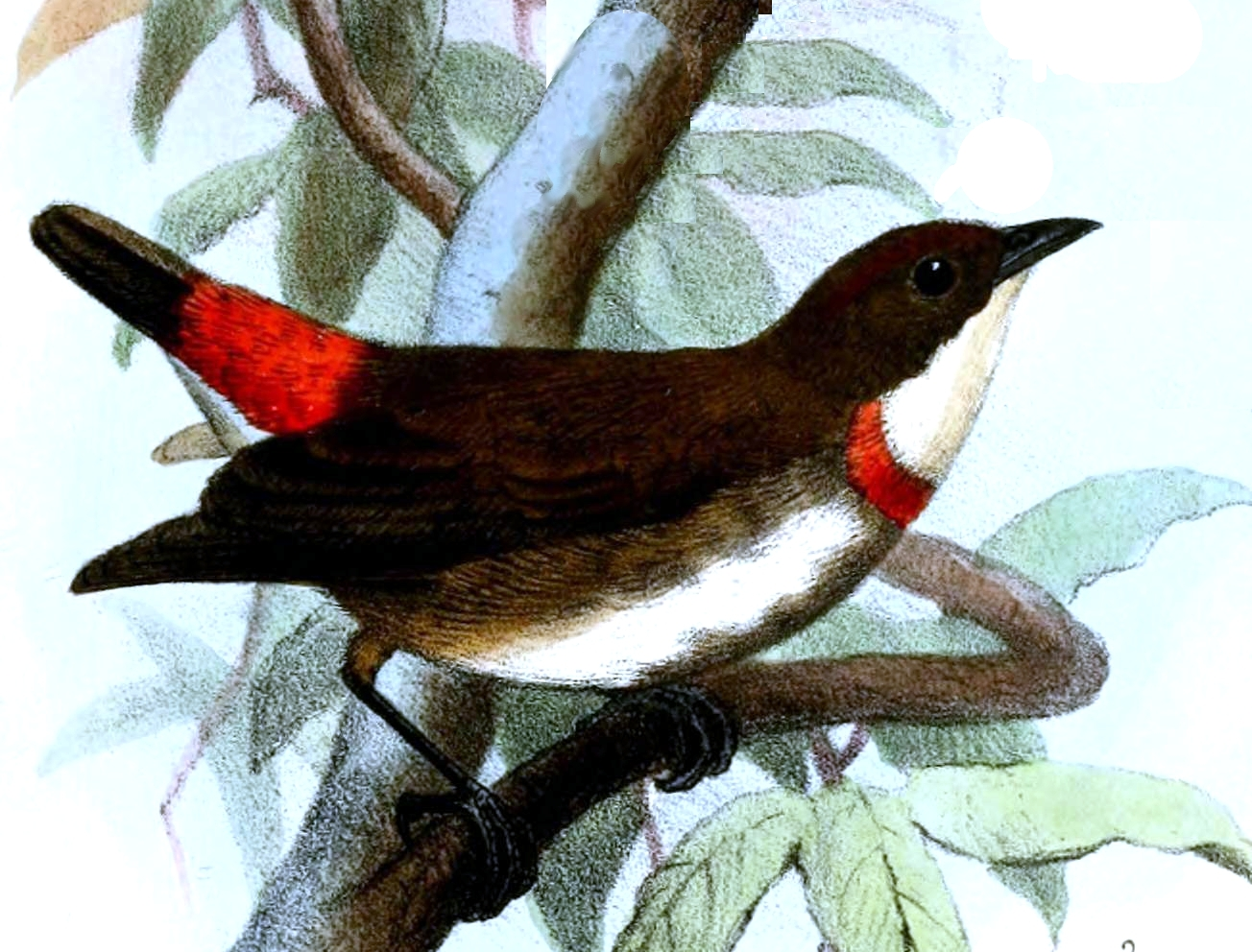

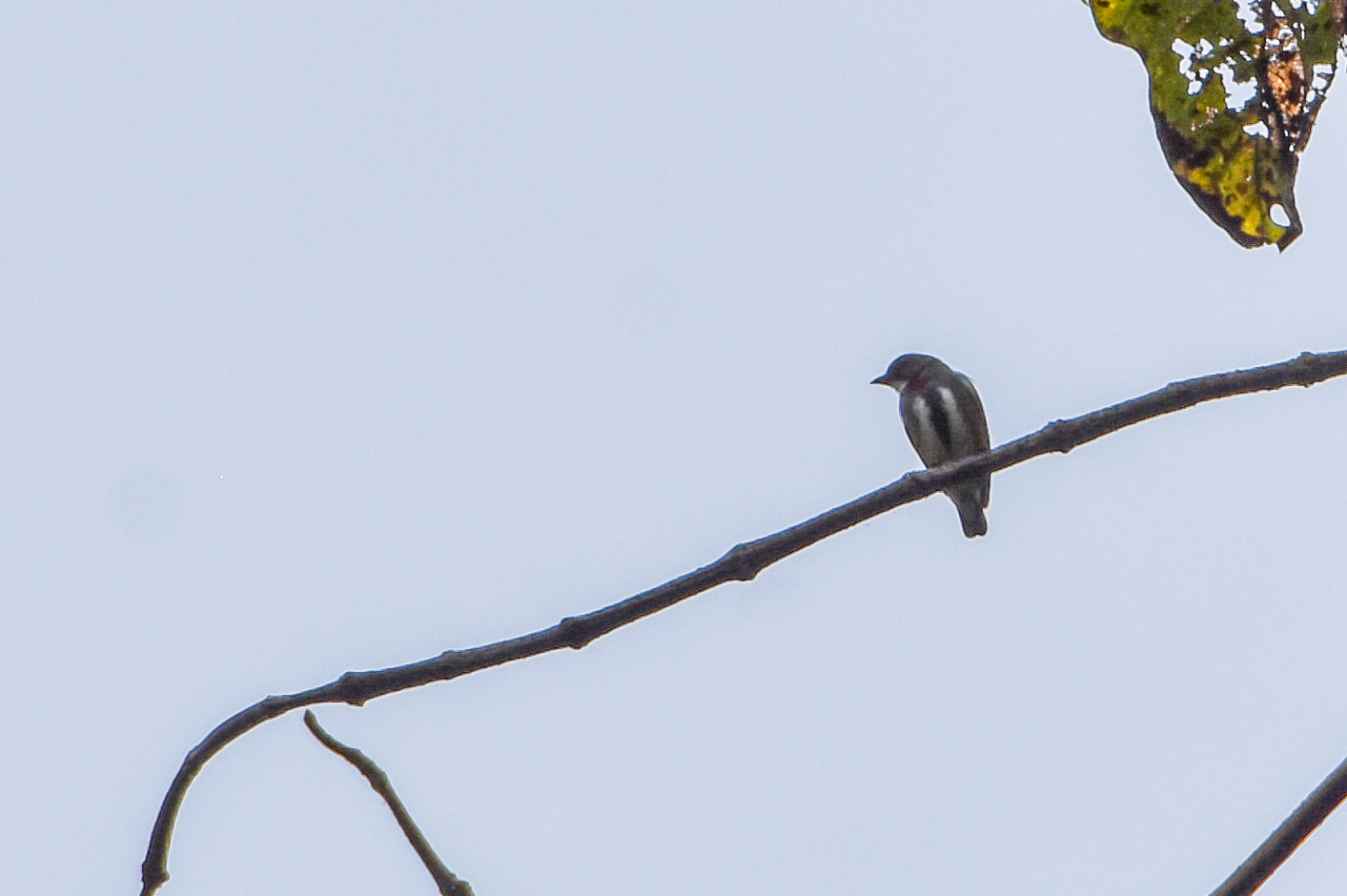

Conservation status
- Least Concern (IUCN 3.1)

Scientific classification
- Kingdom: Animalia
- Phylum: Chordata
- Class: Aves
- Order: Passeriformes
- Family: Dicaeidae
- Genus: Dicaeum
- Species: D. eximium

Binomial name
- Dicaeum eximium PL Sclater, 1877

= Red-banded flowerpecker =

Species of bird

The red-banded flowerpecker (Dicaeum eximium) is a species of bird in the family Dicaeidae. It is endemic to the Bismarck Archipelago.

Its natural habitat is subtropical or tropical moist lowland forest.
