= Louisiade flowerpecker =

Conservation status
- Least Concern (IUCN 3.1)

Scientific classification
- Kingdom: Animalia
- Phylum: Chordata
- Class: Aves
- Order: Passeriformes
- Family: Dicaeidae
- Genus: Dicaeum
- Species: D. nitidum

Binomial name
- Dicaeum nitidum Tristram, 1889

Species of bird

The Louisiade flowerpecker (Dicaeum nitidum) is a species of bird in the family Dicaeidae. It is found on Tagula, Misima and Rossel islands.

Its natural habitat is subtropical or tropical moist lowland forest.
