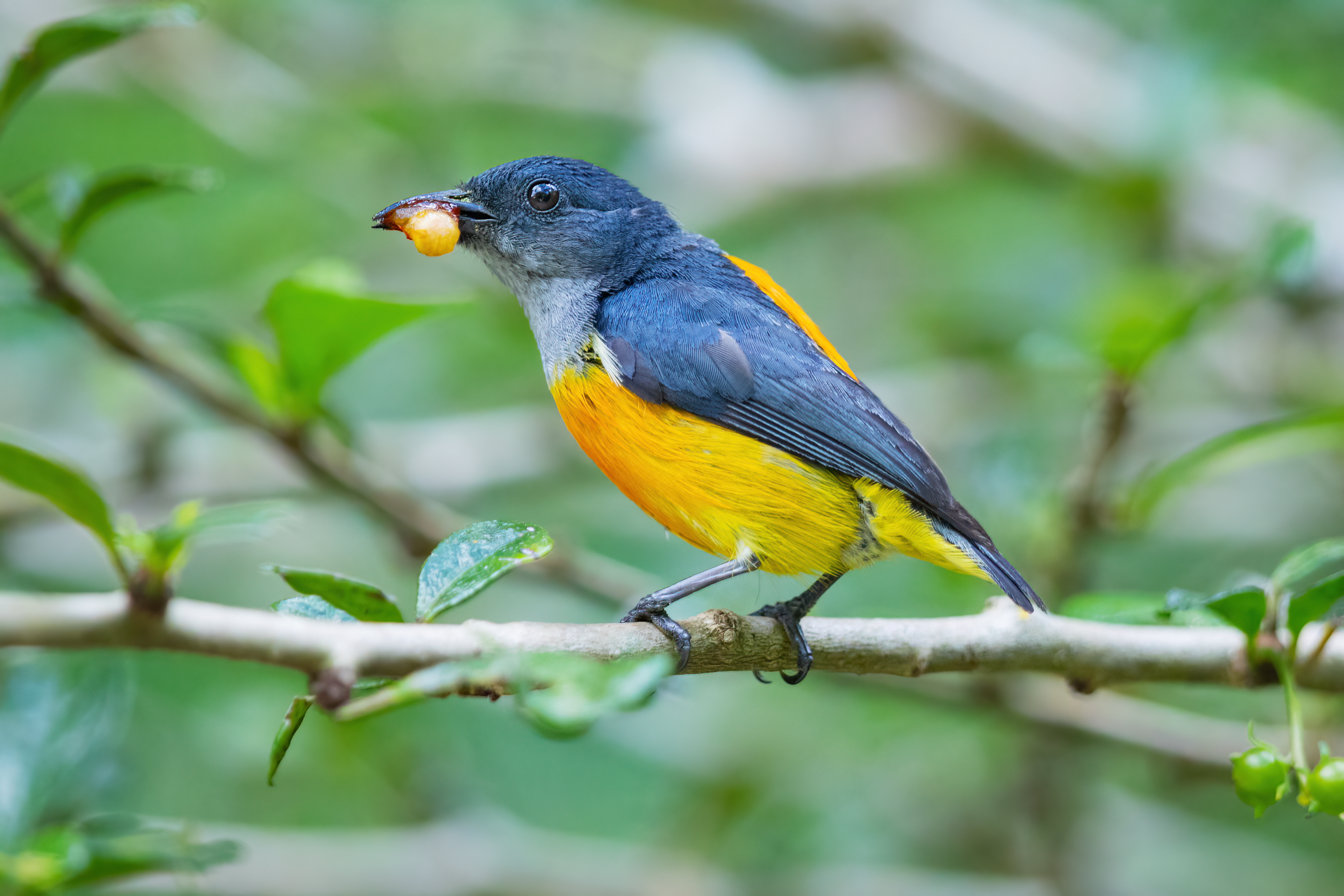

Conservation status
- Least Concern (IUCN 3.1)

Scientific classification
- Kingdom: Animalia
- Phylum: Chordata
- Class: Aves
- Order: Passeriformes
- Family: Dicaeidae
- Genus: Dicaeum
- Species: D. trigonostigma

Binomial name
- Dicaeum trigonostigma (Scopoli, 1786)

= Orange-bellied flowerpecker =

Species of bird

The orange-bellied flowerpecker (Dicaeum trigonostigma) is a species of bird in the family Dicaeidae. It is found in Bangladesh, Brunei, Indonesia, Malaysia, Myanmar, the Philippines, Singapore, and Thailand.

== Habitat ==
Its natural habitats are subtropical or tropical moist lowland forest, subtropical or tropical mangrove forest, and subtropical or tropical moist montane forest.

== Description ==
Male is distinctive, and shows slaty-blue upperparts (crown/nape/wings/tail) except for a large triangular orange patch on the mantle. It has a fairly thin and short bill that is slightly curved downwards at the tip. Upper-breast and throat are a lighter greyish blue; from the lower breast to the vent is a gradient from fiery orange (on the lower breast) to yellow (on the vent). Female is much duller, and is mostly drab olive brown overall, except for its pale orange rump and yellow belly.

Dicaeum trigonostigma melanostigma

Delacour (Birds of Malaysia, 1947) cited a name Dicaeum trigonostigma melanostigma, but because no description accompanied this name, and no type was identified, it was published as a nomen nudum.

He later (in litt.) asserted that the name was a lapsus (Salomonsen, American Mus. Novitates No. 1991 (1960)). However, melanostigma continued to be cited in various lists (Howard and Moore, Complete Checklist of the Birds of the World (1980, 1991)), as well as on websites which list birds common to Thailand and the surrounding region, thus possibly allowing for the inadvertent description of this name should any published reference to it accompany a picture of an orange-bellied flowerpecker. Dickinson (Complete Howard and Moore Checklist (2003)) also asserted that the name was a lapsus, but of Howard and Moore's, with no reference to Delacour.
