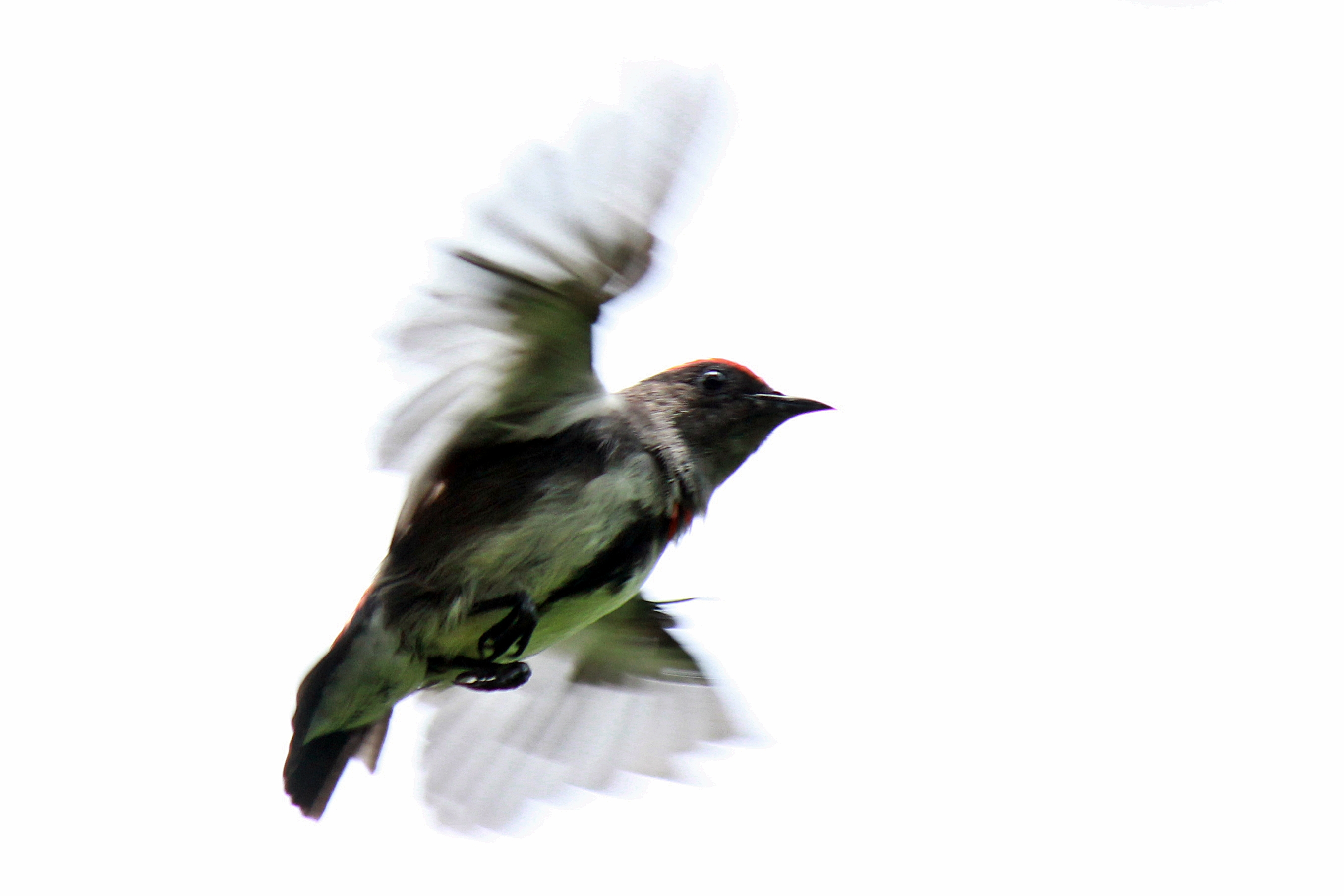

Conservation status
- Least Concern (IUCN 3.1)

Scientific classification
- Kingdom: Animalia
- Phylum: Chordata
- Class: Aves
- Order: Passeriformes
- Family: Dicaeidae
- Genus: Dicaeum
- Species: D. nehrkorni

Binomial name
- Dicaeum nehrkorni Blasius, 1886

= Crimson-crowned flowerpecker =

Species of bird

Crimson-crowned Flowerpecker, male

Crimson-crowned Flowerpecker, female

The crimson-crowned flowerpecker (Dicaeum nehrkorni) is a species of bird in the family Dicaeidae. It is endemic to the island of Sulawesi in Indonesia. Its natural habitats are subtropical or tropical moist lowland forest and subtropical or tropical moist montane forest.
