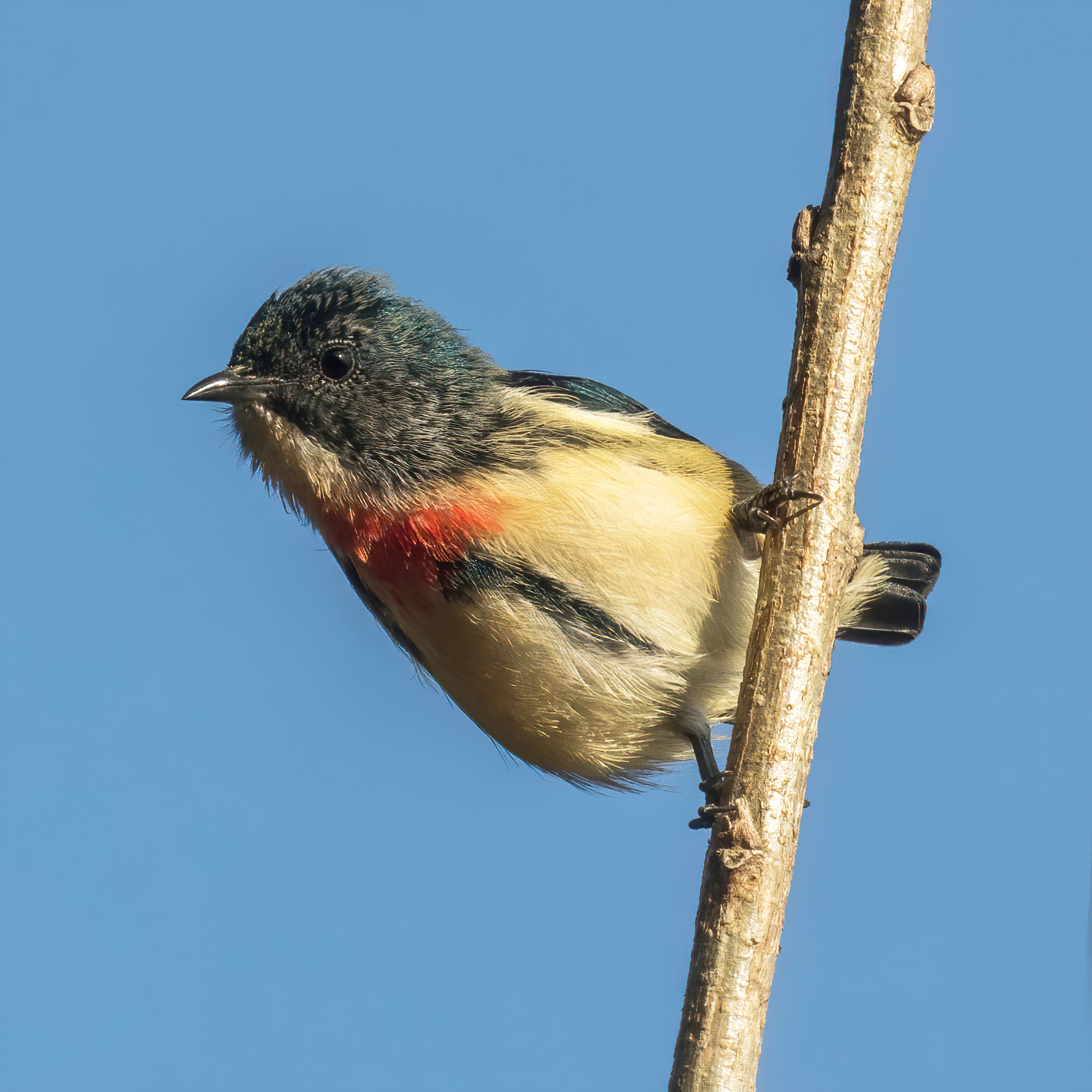
- Male of nominate subspecies from Nepal
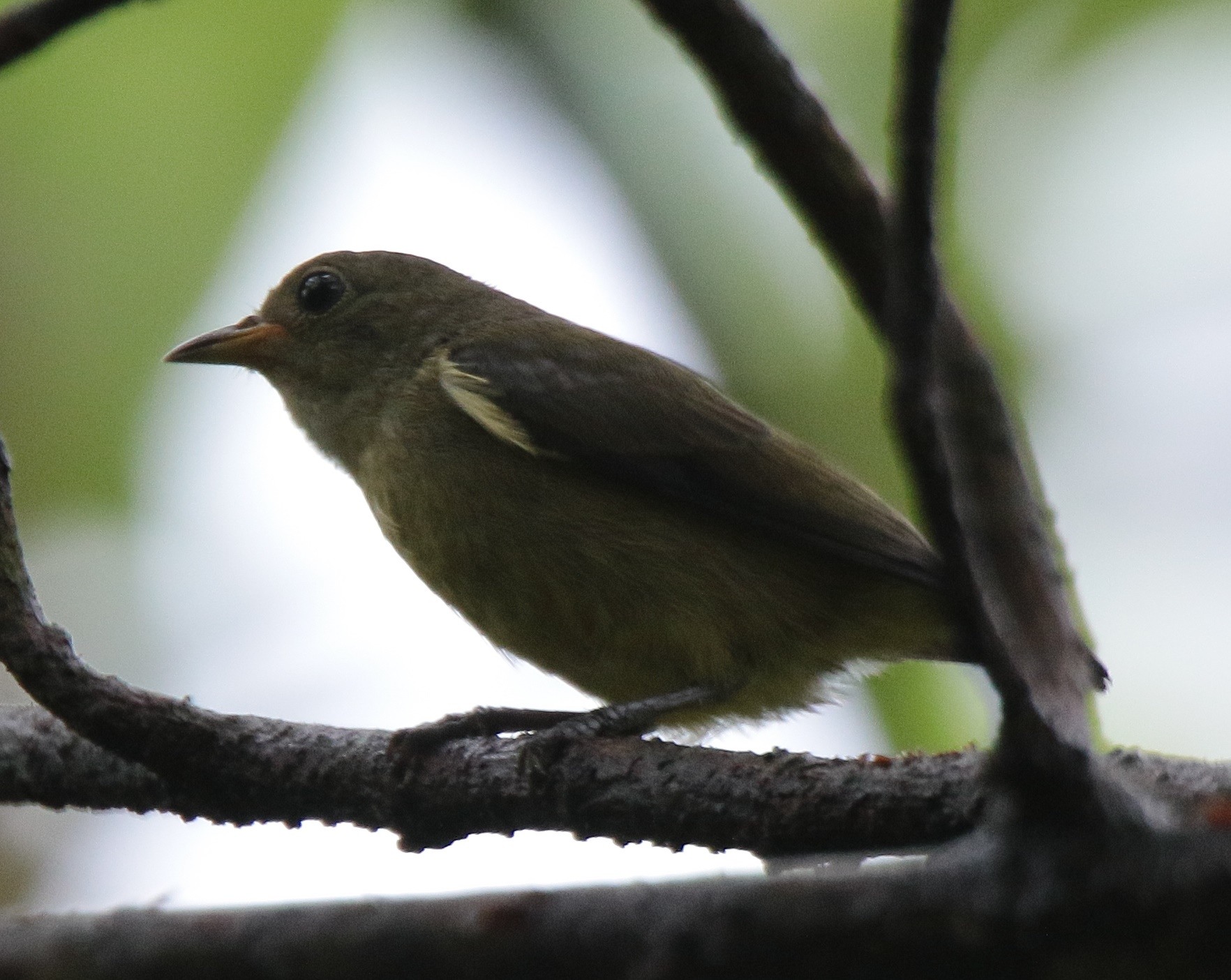
- Female

Conservation status
- Least Concern (IUCN 3.1)

Scientific classification
- Kingdom: Animalia
- Phylum: Chordata
- Class: Aves
- Order: Passeriformes
- Family: Dicaeidae
- Genus: Dicaeum
- Species: D. ignipectus

Binomial name
- Dicaeum ignipectus (Blyth, 1843)

Synonyms
- Myzanthe ignipectus Micrura ignipectus

= Fire-breasted flowerpecker =

Species of bird

The fire-breasted flowerpecker (Dicaeum ignipectus) is a species of bird in the family Dicaeidae found in the Indian subcontinent and Southeast Asia. Like other flowerpeckers, this tiny bird feeds on fruits and plays an important role in the dispersal of fruiting plants. Unlike many other species in the genus, this species has marked sexual dimorphism with the male having contrasting upper and lower parts with a distinctive bright orange breast patch. The female is dull coloured.

== Description ==
The fire-breasted flowerpecker is a small flowerpecker with a small and dark bill. The male has glossy blue-black upperparts. The underside is buffy but a bright red breast patch. Starting below it and along the middle is a short black stripe going down till the belly. The female is dark olive above and buff below. The sides are olive and the bill has a pale base.

Weighing just 7–9 g (0.25–0.32 oz) and measuring under 7 cm (2.8 in) long, it is one of the smallest flowerpeckers. They are usually found at the tops of the trees especially on mistletoes. They have a shrill call given regularly and has been likened to snipping scissors and a staccato tsit.

The species was first described by Edward Blyth in 1843 based on a specimen obtained from Nepal by B H Hodgson. The name was based on Hodgson's manuscripts but was published by Blyth. The type specimen claimed to have been deposited at the British Museum is said to be lost, but may exist in the collection of the Asiatic Society museum in Calcutta.

It has been said to be "the smallest bird of India" or "perhaps the smallest":

... the Fire-breasted Myzanthe (Myzanthe ignipectus), a bird which is remarkable as being the smallest bird of India. So very small is this beautiful little bird, that an adult specimen is hardly two and a half inches in total length, and weighs only three and a half drachms. In its habits it is very like the Dicaeum, frequenting the tops of trees, and keeping itself well out of sight...

— John George Wood, 1862

== Distribution ==
It is found widely distributed along the sub-Himalayan region in India, Nepal, Bhutan, Bangladesh and extends into Southeast Asia into Indonesia, Laos, Thailand, Vietnam, Taiwan, Malaysia and the Philippines. Its natural habitats are temperate forest, subtropical or tropical moist lowland forest, and subtropical or tropical moist montane forest.

Several populations have been named as subspecies. The nominate ignipectus found along the Himalayas into Southeast Asia on the mainland. The remaining are insular populations and include formosum of Taiwan, luzoniense of Luzon, bonga of Samar and apo of the Negros and Mindanao. The species itself forms a superspecies complex with Dicaeum monticolum, D. celebicum, D. sanguinolentum and D. hirundinaceum which are sometimes all treated as one species. Hybridization with Dicaeum cruentatum has been suggested. Many island forms show patterns of very restricted ranges or micro-endemism and it has been suggested that these be treated with care for conservation planning.

The populations found in the Philippines have males with the underparts similar to D. monticolum while the females have a steel-green gloss on the upperparts unlike the dull green of more northern forms. The Sumatran population beccarii is the most distinct form and differs also from D. sanguinolentum. The males have a steel-green gloss on the upper parts and lack the throat patch while the females have greenish upperparts and lack the red rump.

Throughout its range, the species is found in high mountains above 1000 metres but in China, they may be found during winter at lower altitudes.

== Behaviour and ecology ==
Like many other flowerpeckers, they disperse the seeds of mistletoes. In the Nepal Himalayas, they have been found to be important dispersers of Scurrula species.

In Nainital they are said to breed in June and July. The nest is pendant and purse like, opening on the side towards the top. The nest is thin and felt-like, made up of the hairy coverings of stems from mistletoes. The nest is lined with moss and soft grass. Two or three eggs are laid and both sexes incubate and take care of the young.

In Hong Kong, their population is believed to have increased with maturation of restored forest. They were first recorded in 1954 but have starter breed regularly since 1975.

== Gallery ==
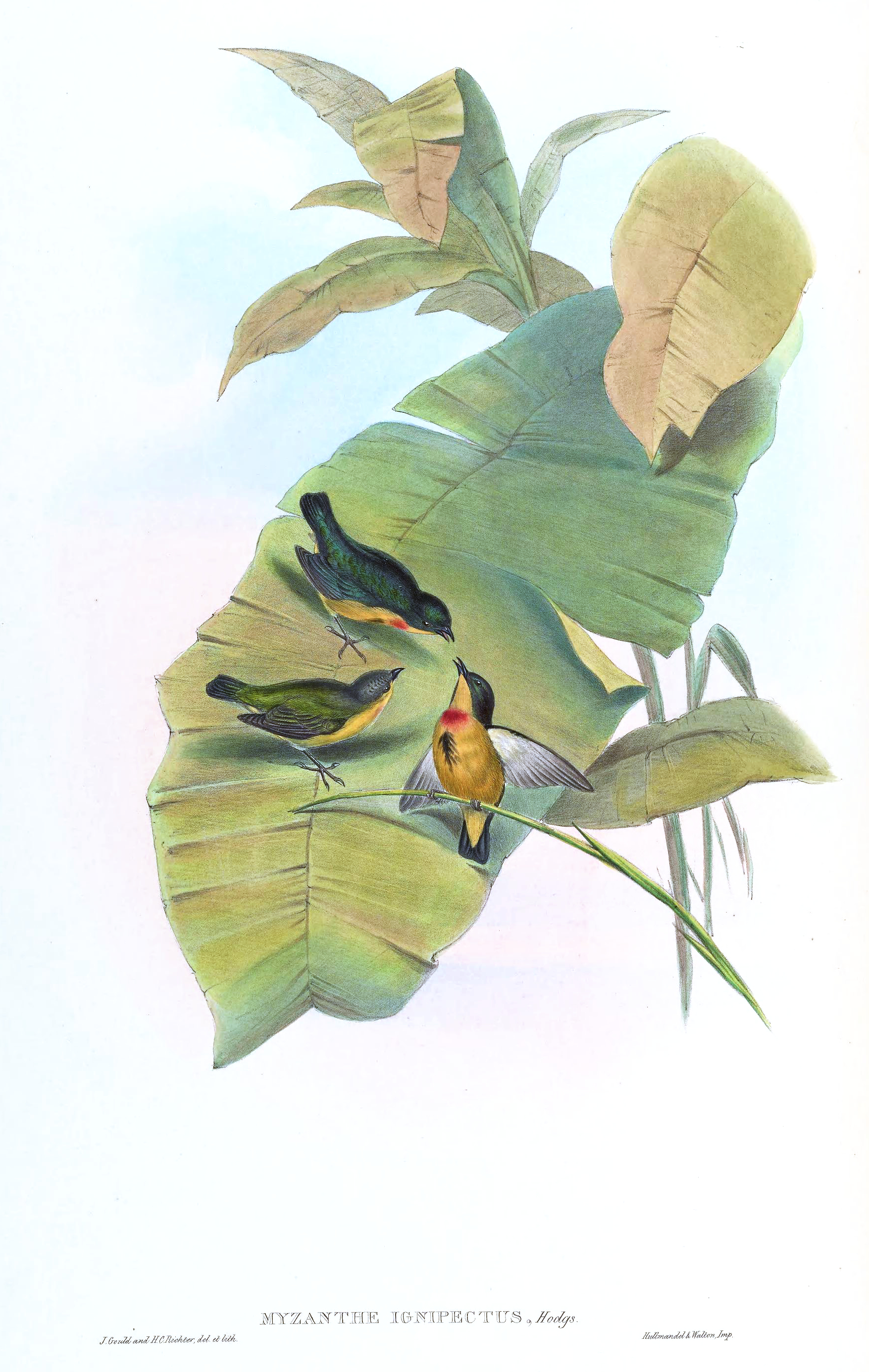
Lithograph by John Gould in the Birds of Asia (1850–83), volume 6, plate 14. T. C. Jerdon noted that he had in his Birds of India, "... omitted to mention the black streak extending along the middle of the abdomen from the termination of the scarlet breast-spot...."

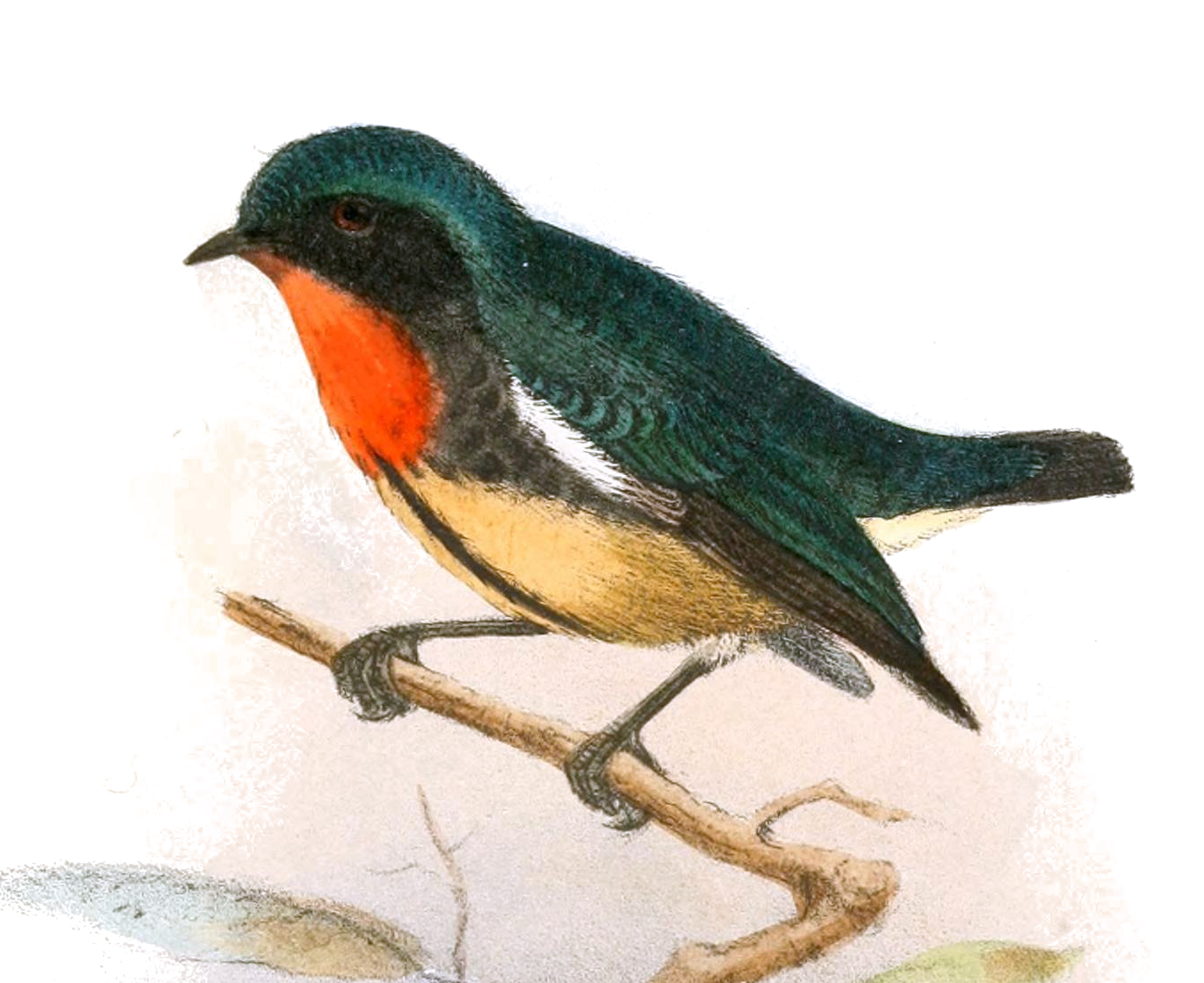
D. i. formosum

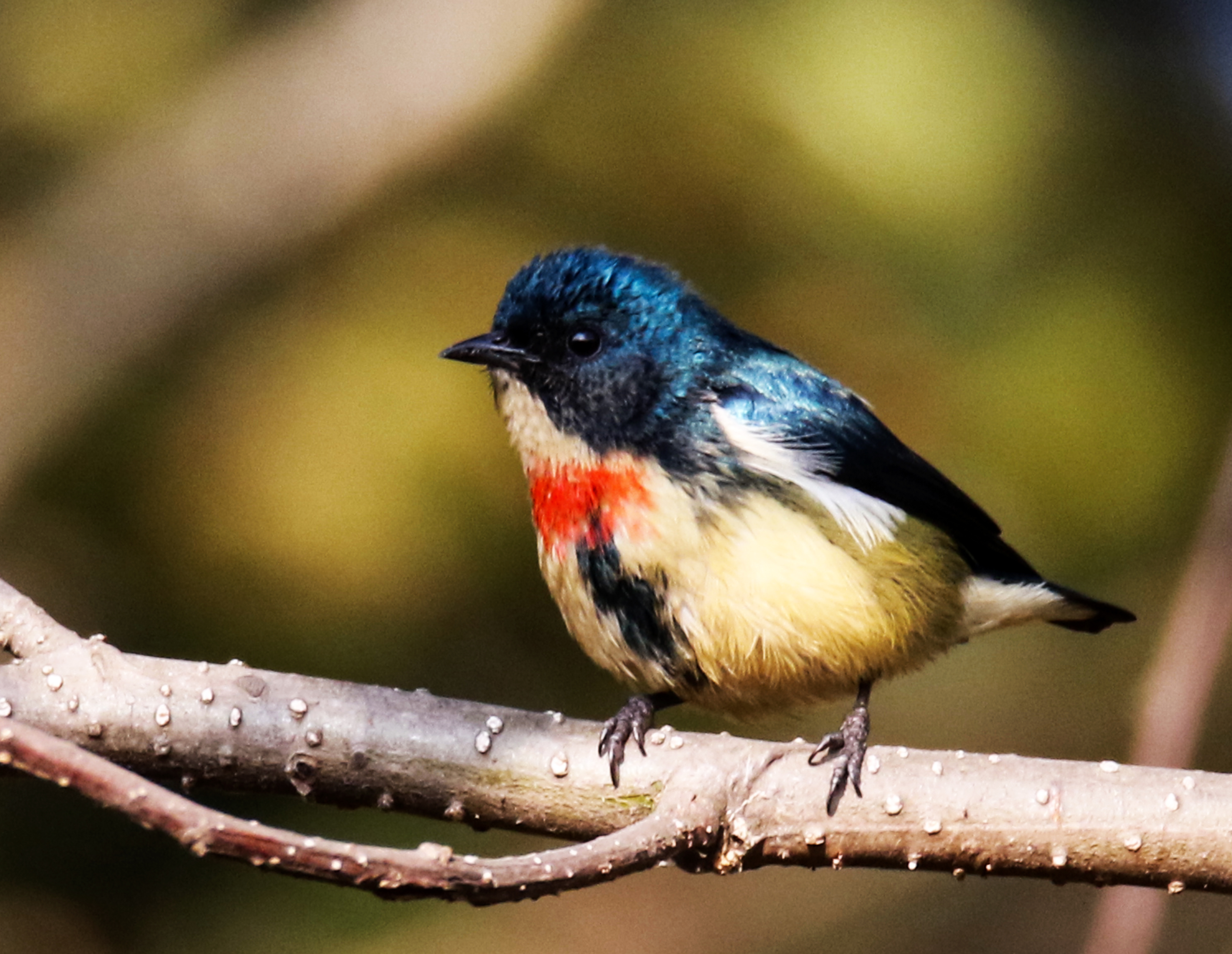
Male of nominate race, Nepal.

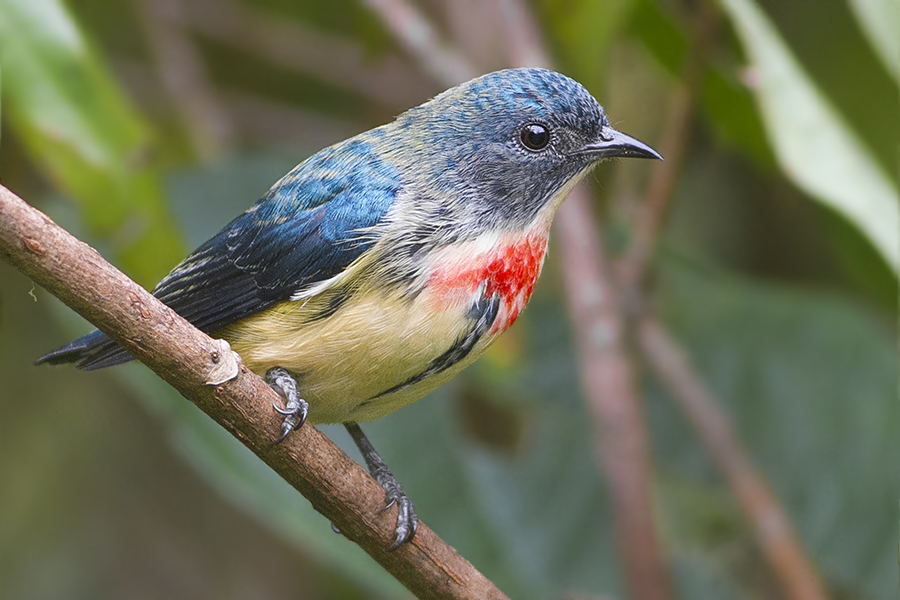
Fire-breasted flowerpecker, Khangchendzonga National Park, Sikkim, India

== Other sources ==
- Lin, Chen-Wei (2006). Studying breeding bird densities in Meifeng Area by Territory mapping. M Sc. Thesis. National Taiwan University. PDF
