= List of Medinilla species =

Medinilla is a genus of flowering plants in the family Melastomataceae. As of April 2026, Plants of the World Online accepts the following 374 species:

== A ==
- Medinilla acutialata Pócs & Khoi
- Medinilla acutissimifolia H.Perrier
- Medinilla afromontana Lebrun & Taton
- Medinilla aggregata Bakh.f.
- Medinilla alata Baker f.
- Medinilla albida Merr. & L.M.Perry
- Medinilla allantocalyx Regalado
- Medinilla alpestris (Jack) Blume
- Medinilla ambrensis Jum. & H.Perrier
- Medinilla amplectens Regalado
- Medinilla amplexicaulis Blume
- Medinilla amplifolia Merr.
- Medinilla anamalaiana Sasidh. & Sujanapal
- Medinilla andasibeensis Jum. & H.Perrier
- Medinilla andrarangensis Jum. & H.Perrier
- Medinilla angustifolia Jum. & H.Perrier
- Medinilla anisophylla Merr.
- Medinilla ankaizinensis H.Perrier
- Medinilla annulata C.B.Rob.
- Medinilla annulifera Ohwi
- Medinilla antonii Elmer
- Medinilla apayaoensis Merr.
- Medinilla apoensis C.B.Rob.
- Medinilla arboricola F.C.How
- Medinilla archboldiana A.C.Sm.
- Medinilla arfakensis Baker f.
- Medinilla arunachalica G.D.Pal
- Medinilla ascendens Jum. & H.Perrier
- Medinilla astronioides Triana
- Medinilla atroviridis Regalado
- Medinilla aurantiiflora Elmer
- Medinilla auriculata Lauterb.

== B ==
- Medinilla bakeriana Mansf.
- Medinilla balakrishnanii Jayanthi, Karthig., Sumathi & Diwakar
- Medinilla balls-headleyi F.Muell.
- Medinilla banahaensis Elmer
- Medinilla baronii Baker
- Medinilla basaltarum Jum. & H.Perrier
- Medinilla beamanii Regalado
- Medinilla beccariana Cogn.
- Medinilla beddomei C.B.Clarke
- Medinilla benguetensis Elmer
- Medinilla berastagiensis Karton.
- Medinilla bicolor Merr.
- Medinilla bigradata H.Perrier
- Medinilla binaria Elmer
- Medinilla bismarck-ramuensis W.N.Takeuchi
- Medinilla blumeana Mansf.
- Medinilla boemiensis Kaneh. & Hatus. ex Ohwi
- Medinilla botryocarpa Regalado
- Medinilla bracteata Blume
- Medinilla brassii Markgr.
- Medinilla brevipes Merr.
- Medinilla buennemeyeri Bakh.f.

== C ==
- Medinilla cacuminum Jum. & H.Perrier
- Medinilla calcicola Merr.
- Medinilla calcicrassa Jum. & H.Perrier
- Medinilla calelanensis Elmer
- Medinilla calliantha Merr. & L.M.Perry
- Medinilla campana C.W.Lin
- Medinilla campanulata Jum. & H.Perrier
- Medinilla capitata Merr.
- Medinilla cauliflora Hemsl.
- Medinilla celebica Blume
- Medinilla cephalantha Merr. & L.M.Perry
- Medinilla cephalophora Merr.
- Medinilla ceramensis Bakh.f.
- Medinilla chapelieri Cogn.
- Medinilla chermezonii H.Perrier
- Medinilla clarkei King
- Medinilla clathrata Bodegom
- Medinilla clemensiana Regalado
- Medinilla clementis Merr.
- Medinilla compressicaulis Merr.
- Medinilla congesta Merr.
- Medinilla copelandii Merr.
- Medinilla corallina Cogn.
- Medinilla cordata Merr.
- Medinilla cordifolia Baker ex H.Perrier
- Medinilla coriacea Merr.
- Medinilla corneri Regalado
- Medinilla coronata Regalado
- Medinilla coursiana H.Perrier
- Medinilla crassata Elmer
- Medinilla crassinervia Blume
- Medinilla crassiuscula Ohwi
- Medinilla crispata (L.) Blume
- Medinilla cucullata H.Perrier
- Medinilla cuernosensis Elmer
- Medinilla cumingii Naudin
- Medinilla cuneata (Thwaites) K.Bremer & Lundin
- Medinilla curranii Merr.
- Medinilla curtisii Veitch
- Medinilla cymosa Jum. & H.Perrier

== D ==
- Medinilla dallciana Fernando & Balete
- Medinilla danumensis Regalado
- Medinilla decaryi H.Perrier
- Medinilla decora A.C.Sm.
- Medinilla dentata Veldkamp
- Medinilla disparifolia C.B.Rob.
- Medinilla divaricata Baker
- Medinilla diversifolia Kaneh.
- Medinilla dolichophylla Merr.

== E ==
- Medinilla elegans Elmer
- Medinilla endertii Regalado
- Medinilla engganensis Bakh.f.
- Medinilla engleri Gilg
- Medinilla ericarum Jum. & H.Perrier
- Medinilla ericoidea Steenis
- Medinilla erpetina Triana
- Medinilla erythrotricha Elmer
- Medinilla exigua Merr. & L.M.Perry
- Medinilla eximia (Jack) Blume

== F ==
- Medinilla falcata H.Perrier
- Medinilla fasciculata Baker
- Medinilla fasciculiflora Ohwi
- Medinilla fengii (S.Y.Hu) C.Y.Wu & C.Chen
- Medinilla fenicis Merr.
- Medinilla ferruginea Merr.
- Medinilla ferruginescens Ohwi
- Medinilla flagellifera Jum. & H.Perrier
- Medinilla flammea C.W.Lin
- Medinilla forbesii Baker f.
- Medinilla formosana Hayata
- Medinilla fragilis Regalado
- Medinilla frodinii Bodegom
- Medinilla fuchsioides Gardner
- Medinilla furfuracea Merr.

== G ==
- Medinilla glandulosa Bodegom
- Medinilla glomerata Jum. & H.Perrier
- Medinilla gracilis Veldkamp
- Medinilla grandifolia Bodegom
- Medinilla griffithii C.B.Clarke

== H ==
- Medinilla halconensis Merr.
- Medinilla halogeton S.Moore
- Medinilla hayatana H.Keng
- Medinilla hellwigiana Mansf.
- Medinilla heteromorphophylla Guillaumin
- Medinilla heterophylla A.Gray
- Medinilla hexamera Baker f.
- Medinilla himalayana Hook.f. ex Triana
- Medinilla hollrungiana Mansf.
- Medinilla homoeandra (Stapf) M.P.Nayar
- Medinilla honbaensis Guillaumin
- Medinilla humbertiana H.Perrier
- Medinilla humblotii Cogn.
- Medinilla humilis Teijsm. & Binn.
- Medinilla hypericifolia Blume

== I ==
- Medinilla ibityensis H.Perrier
- Medinilla inaequifolia C.B.Rob.
- Medinilla insignis Mansf.
- Medinilla interiaciens Bodegom
- Medinilla intermedia Blume
- Medinilla ivohibeensis H.Perrier

== J ==
- Medinilla johnii Kottaim.

== K ==
- Medinilla kajewskii Merr. & L.M.Perry
- Medinilla kambikambi A.C.Sm.
- Medinilla kandavuensis A.C.Sm.
- Medinilla kanehirae Ohwi
- Medinilla kaniensis Mansf.
- Medinilla kinabaluensis Regalado
- Medinilla korinchensis Ridl.

== L ==
- Medinilla lagunae S.Vidal
- Medinilla lanceolata Baker
- Medinilla lancifolia Merr. & L.M.Perry
- Medinilla lasioclados Stapf
- Medinilla lateralis Merr.
- Medinilla latericia Regalado
- Medinilla laurifolia Blume
- Medinilla lauterbachiana Mansf.
- Medinilla laxiflora Ridl.
- Medinilla ledermannii Mansf.
- Medinilla lemurum H.Perrier
- Medinilla lenticellata Bodegom
- Medinilla leptophylla Baker
- Medinilla leucantha Merr. & L.M.Perry
- Medinilla leytensis Merr.
- Medinilla linearifolia Baker
- Medinilla longicymosa Gibbs
- Medinilla longifila Jum. & H.Perrier
- Medinilla longifolia Cogn.
- Medinilla longipedunculata Cogn.
- Medinilla lophoclada Baker
- Medinilla loranthoides Naudin
- Medinilla lordbergiana Mansf.
- Medinilla lorentziana Mansf.
- Medinilla luraluensis Merr. & L.M.Perry

== M ==
- Medinilla macrophylla Blume
- Medinilla macrophyma Jum. & H.Perrier
- Medinilla maculata Gardner
- Medinilla madagascariensis Kottaim.
- Medinilla magnifica Lindl.
- Medinilla maidenii F.Muell.
- Medinilla malabarica Bedd. & C.E.C.Fisch.
- Medinilla malaboensis Bakh.f.
- Medinilla malabrigoi Z.D.Meneses, Adorador & Quakenbush
- Medinilla malindangensis Merr.
- Medinilla maluensis Mansf.
- Medinilla mandrakensis H.Perrier
- Medinilla mannii Hook.f.
- Medinilla mansfeldiana Merr. & L.M.Perry
- Medinilla markgrafii Merr. & L.M.Perry
- Medinilla masoalensis Jum. & H.Perrier
- Medinilla matitanensis Jum. & H.Perrier
- Medinilla matthewii Ridl.
- Medinilla mearnsii Merr.
- Medinilla medinillana (Gaudich.) Fosberg & Sachet
- Medinilla megacalyx Merr.
- Medinilla membranacea Merr.
- Medinilla merguiensis C.B.Clarke
- Medinilla merrittii Merr.
- Medinilla micrantha Jum. & H.Perrier
- Medinilla micranthera H.Perrier
- Medinilla microcephala Regalado
- Medinilla mindorensis Merr.
- Medinilla miniata Merr.
- Medinilla minutibracteata Bodegom
- Medinilla minutifolia Bodegom
- Medinilla mirabile (Gilg) Jacq.-Fél.
- Medinilla montana Cogn.
- Medinilla montisaping Regalado
- Medinilla mortonii Hemsl.
- Medinilla mucronata Koord. ex Bakh.f.
- Medinilla multialata Quisumb. & Merr.
- Medinilla multibracteata Bodegom
- Medinilla multiflora Merr.
- Medinilla multinervia Merr.
- Medinilla muricata Blume
- Medinilla musofo K.Schum. & Lauterb.
- Medinilla myrtiformis (Naudin) Triana

== N ==
- Medinilla nabirensis Karton.
- Medinilla nana S.Y.Hu
- Medinilla napiformis Bakh.f.
- Medinilla neopendens Idrees
- Medinilla nodosa Fosberg
- Medinilla novoguineensis Baker f.

== O ==
- Medinilla oblanceolata Merr.
- Medinilla oblongifolia Cogn.
- Medinilla obovata Merr.
- Medinilla obreensis Mansf.
- Medinilla occidentalis Naudin
- Medinilla ovalifolia (A.Gray) A.C.Sm.
- Medinilla ovalis Merr.
- Medinilla ovata Jum. & H.Perrier

== P ==
- Medinilla pachygona C.B.Rob.
- Medinilla pachyphylla Jum. & H.Perrier
- Medinilla palawanensis Regalado
- Medinilla panayensis Merr.
- Medinilla paniculata Mansf.
- Medinilla papillosa Baker
- Medinilla papuana Scheff.
- Medinilla papulosa Ohwi
- Medinilla parva Merr.
- Medinilla parvibractea Merr.
- Medinilla patens Ridl.
- Medinilla pauciflora Hook.f. ex Triana
- Medinilla pedunculosa Ohwi ex Regalado
- Medinilla peekelii Mansf.
- Medinilla pellita Veldkamp & Karton.
- Medinilla peltata Merr.
- Medinilla pendens Ridl.
- Medinilla pendula Merr.
- Medinilla penduliflora Ridl.
- Medinilla perakensis King
- Medinilla perrieri Veldkamp & Karton.
- Medinilla petelotii Merr.
- Medinilla pinnatinervia Merr.
- Medinilla plumosa Mansf.
- Medinilla polillensis C.B.Rob.
- Medinilla porphyrandra Ridl.
- Medinilla prostrata Jum. & H.Perrier
- Medinilla pterocaula Blume
- Medinilla pubiflora Merr. & L.M.Perry
- Medinilla pulleana Mansf.
- Medinilla punicea Bodegom
- Medinilla purpurea Elmer ex Merr.
- Medinilla purpureoviridis C.W.Lin
- Medinilla pycnantha Quisumb. & Merr.

== Q ==
- Medinilla quadrangularis Jum. & H.Perrier
- Medinilla quadrialata Ohwi ex Regalado
- Medinilla quadrifolia (Blume) Blume
- Medinilla quartzitarum Jum. & H.Perrier
- Medinilla quintuplinervis Cogn.

== R ==
- Medinilla racemosa H.St.John
- Medinilla radicans (Blume) Blume
- Medinilla radiciflora Quisumb. & Merr.
- Medinilla ramiflora Merr.
- Medinilla rangkong C.W.Lin
- Medinilla rhodochlaena A.Gray
- Medinilla rhodorhachis Baker f.
- Medinilla richardsii Regalado
- Medinilla ridleyi Merr.
- Medinilla robinsonii Elmer
- Medinilla robusticaulis Bakh.f.
- Medinilla rotundiflora H.Perrier
- Medinilla rubella H.Perrier
- Medinilla rubescens Merr. & L.M.Perry
- Medinilla rubicunda (Jack) Blume
- Medinilla rubiginosa Cogn.
- Medinilla rubrifrons Regalado
- Medinilla rubrifructus Ohwi
- Medinilla rubrinervis Jum. & H.Perrier ex Cordem.
- Medinilla rubrovenia Baker f.
- Medinilla rufescens Regalado
- Medinilla rufopilosa Ohwi ex Regalado

== S ==
- Medinilla sahyadrica Sujanapal & Sasidh.
- Medinilla salicifolia Blume
- Medinilla salicina Ohwi ex Regalado
- Medinilla samoensis (Hochr.) Christoph.
- Medinilla sarcorhiza Cogn.
- Medinilla schlechteri Mansf.
- Medinilla schraderbergensis Mansf.
- Medinilla schumanniana Mansf.
- Medinilla scortechinii King
- Medinilla sedifolia Jum. & H.Perrier
- Medinilla selangorensis J.F.Maxwell
- Medinilla sessiliflora Regalado
- Medinilla sessilifolia Merr.
- Medinilla sessilis Merr. & L.M.Perry
- Medinilla setiflora Bodegom
- Medinilla setigera (Blume) Miq.
- Medinilla simplicymosa Malabrigo, A.G.Umali & A.B.Tobias
- Medinilla sogeriensis Baker f.
- Medinilla spectabilis A.C.Sm.
- Medinilla sphaerocarpa Hochr.
- Medinilla squillula Veldkamp
- Medinilla stenobotrys Merr.
- Medinilla stephanostegia Stapf
- Medinilla subalata Baker f.
- Medinilla subauriculata Regalado
- Medinilla subcordata Cogn.
- Medinilla suberosa Regalado
- Medinilla subviridis A.C.Sm.
- Medinilla succulenta (Blume) Blume
- Medinilla sulcata Quisumb. & Merr.
- Medinilla surigaoensis Regalado

== T ==
- Medinilla tapete-magicum Cámara-Leret & Veldkamp
- Medinilla tayabensis Merr.
- Medinilla tenuicaulis Ridl.
- Medinilla tenuipedicellata Baker f.
- Medinilla tenuipes Merr.
- Medinilla ternatensis Miq.
- Medinilla ternifolia Triana
- Medinilla tetragona Cogn.
- Medinilla tetraptera Ohwi
- Medinilla teysmannii Miq.
- Medinilla theresae Fernando
- Medinilla torrentum Jum. & H.Perrier
- Medinilla torricellensis Mansf.
- Medinilla triangularis Jum. & H.Perrier
- Medinilla trinervia Cogn.
- Medinilla triochiton Bodegom
- Medinilla triplinervia Cogn.
- Medinilla tsinjoarivensis H.Perrier
- Medinilla tuberosa Jum. & H.Perrier
- Medinilla tulagiensis Merr. & L.M.Perry

== U ==
- Medinilla ultramaficola Quakenbush, Y.P.Ang & R.Bustam.
- Medinilla umbellata Merr.
- Medinilla umbrina Elmer
- Medinilla uncidens Jum. & H.Perrier
- Medinilla uninervis Veldkamp
- Medinilla urophylla Stapf

== V ==
- Medinilla vagans Merr. & L.M.Perry
- Medinilla varingoidea Bakh.f.
- Medinilla venosa (Blume) Blume
- Medinilla venusta King
- Medinilla vexillifera C.W.Lin & Rubite
- Medinilla viguieri H.Perrier
- Medinilla viscoides Triana
- Medinilla vohipararensis Jum. & H.Perrier

== W ==
- Medinilla warica Mansf.
- Medinilla waterhousei Seem.
- Medinilla whitfordii Merr.

== Z ==
- Medinilla zoster Veldkamp
