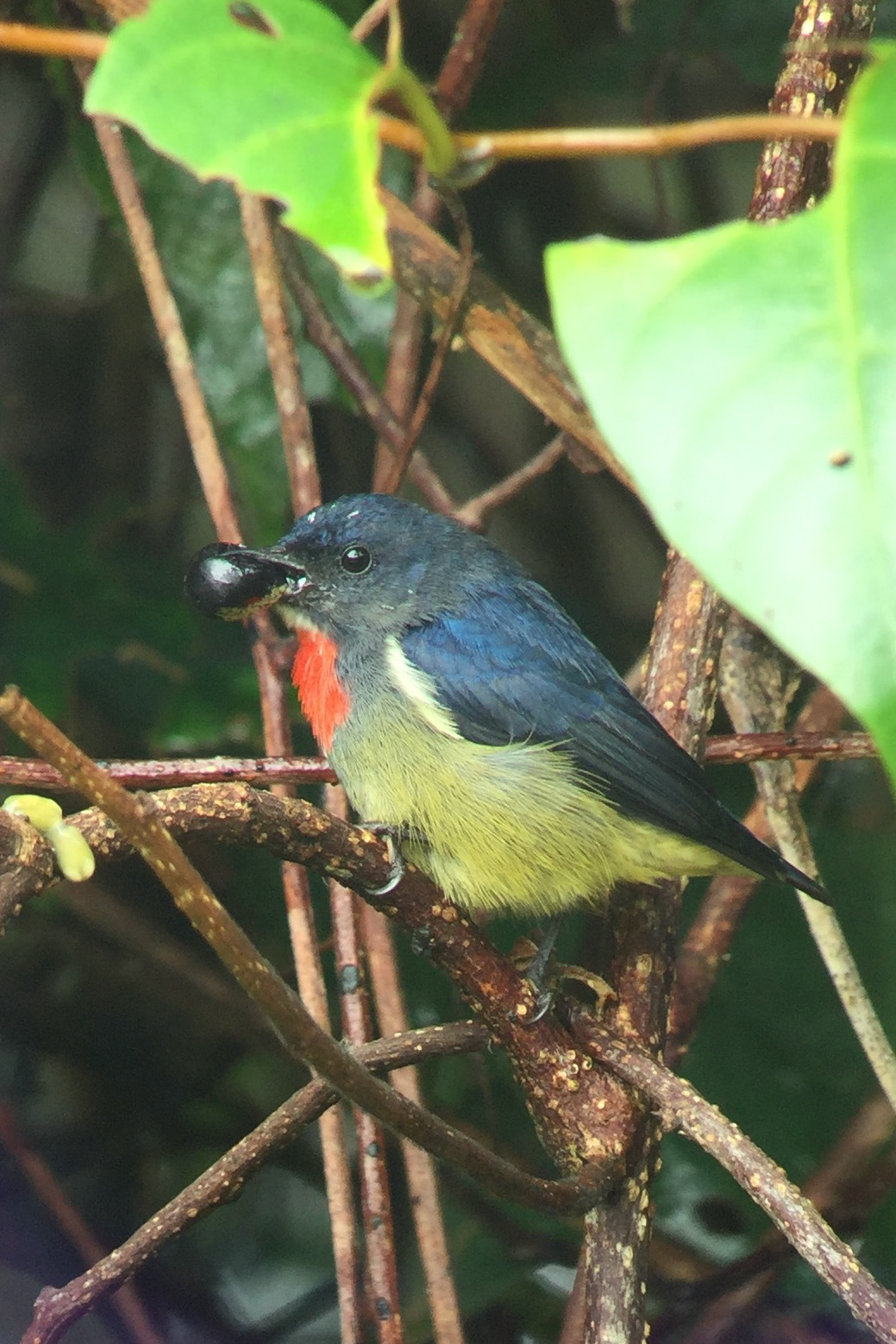
- Male with Medinilla speciosa berry

Conservation status
- Least Concern (IUCN 3.1)

Scientific classification
- Kingdom: Animalia
- Phylum: Chordata
- Class: Aves
- Order: Passeriformes
- Family: Dicaeidae
- Genus: Dicaeum
- Species: D. monticolum

Binomial name
- Dicaeum monticolum Sharpe, 1887

Synonyms
- Dicaeum monticola Sharpe, 1889

= Black-sided flowerpecker =

Species of bird

The black-sided flowerpecker (Dicaeum monticolum), also known as the Bornean flowerpecker, is a species of bird in the family Dicaeidae. It is endemic to the island of Borneo, where it is found in the mountains, primarily above 1,000 m (3,300 ft) in elevation. The species is sexually dimorphic. The male has glossy blue-black upperparts, with a scarlet throat and breast, a dark grey upper belly, olive flanks, a white lower belly, and a buffy vent and undertail coverts. The female is olive-green above and greyish below, with buffy flanks and a whitish throat. It inhabits a range of forest habitats, including primary and secondary montane forest, kerangas forest, and scrub, and is also occasionally found in gardens. It feeds primarily on small fruits—particularly mistletoe berries—as well as seeds, nectar, and various invertebrates. It builds a nest of moss, camouflaged on the outside with lichens and lined with the pith of tree ferns. The International Union for Conservation of Nature rates it as a species of least concern. Though its numbers have not been quantified, the black-sided flowerpecker is said to be common throughout much of its range, and any declines are not thought to be precipitous. However, destruction of forest for palm plantations may impact it.

== Taxonomy and systematics ==
When Richard Bowdler Sharpe first described the black-sided flowerpecker in 1887, using a specimen collected on Borneo's Mount Kinabalu, he named it Dicaeum monticolum. It is closely allied to, and forms a superspecies with, four other species: blood-breasted flowerpecker, mistletoebird, grey-sided flowerpecker, and fire-breasted flowerpecker. At points in the past, it has been considered conspecific with one or more of those other species in a variety of combinations by a variety of authors. The grey-sided flowerpecker, which is endemic to Sulawesi, is its closest relative. There are no subspecies.

The genus name Dicaeum is an Ancient Greek word, perhaps for an Indian bird mentioned by Aelianus. The species name monticolum is Latin for "mountain dweller" or "mountaineer". It is also known as the Bornean flowerpecker.

== Description ==
The black-sided flowerpecker is a very small passerine, measuring a mere 8 cm (3.1 in) in length. Its weight has not been recorded. Like many flowerpeckers, it is sexually dimorphic; the male is considerably more colourful than the female. The male has glossy blue-black upperparts. His face and the sides of his neck are black, his chin is white, and he has a scarlet throat and breast surrounded by a greyish-black border. His upper flanks and upper belly are dark grey, while his lower flanks are olive, and his lower belly white. His vent and undertail coverts are buffy-yellow. His underwing coverts are white, as are his pectoral tufts. The female has olive-green upperparts and greyish underparts, with buffy flanks, a yellowish rump, a whitish throat and white pectoral tufts. Immature birds are like the female, but more olive-grey below. They are finely streaked with dark from their chin to the breast, and males may show some crimson on the breast. Both sexes have dark brown irises, black bills, and feet variously described as brown or dark grey.

=== Voice ===
The black-sided flowerpecker has a number of vocalisations, including a high-pitched zit, a high, weak tseeep, a quick tsit-tsit, a slurred tsweet tsweet, and a loud, steady clicking.

=== Similar species ===
The female can be confused with the plain flowerpecker, but is larger and has a whiter throat. Her back is also more olive-toned, as compared to the browner-backed plain flowerpecker. All other similar species are allopatric—not found on Borneo—so not likely to be confused.

== Habitat and range ==
The black-sided flowerpecker is endemic to the montane forests of Borneo. It is typically seen above 1,000 m (3,300 ft) and as high as 2,540 m (8,330 ft) in some locations, though it also descends as low as 460 m (1,510 ft) on two of the island's bigger mountains (Kinabalu and Mount Trus Madi). There are far more records from Malaysia's states of Sabah and Sarawak than from Indonesia's Kalimantan provinces. It is found in primary and secondary forest, kerangas forest (heathland), scrub, and gardens.

== Ecology ==
The black-sided flowerpecker is not known to make any seasonal or altitudinal movements.

=== Feeding ===
Like all flowerpeckers, the black-sided flowerpecker is a frugivore. It specializes on mistletoe berries (particularly those of the family Loranthaceae), but also eats other small fruits, including Medinilla speciosa berries. Its diet includes seeds, nectar, and various invertebrates. Most of its foraging takes place close to the ground, but it sometimes feeds in the canopy.

=== Breeding ===
Little is known about the breeding ecology of the black-sided flowerpecker. Young have been recorded between November and February, and adults in breeding condition have been found during that period. The nest is made of moss and lined with the pith of tree ferns. Lichens are used to camouflage its surface. The eggs are undescribed.

== Conservation ==
The International Union for Conservation of Nature rates the black-sided flowerpecker as a species of least concern, though its population has not been quantified. While its numbers are thought to be decreasing, the rate of decline is not thought to be precipitous, and the population is not fragmented. The species is said to be common throughout much of its range. Destruction of forest for oil palm plantations could have a detrimental impact on their numbers. Studies have shown that black-sided flowerpeckers are only found in palm groves in small numbers and within 300 m (980 ft) of the edge of forest; they were not found further into extensive groves.
