= Medinilla acutialata =

Scientific classification
- Kingdom: Plantae
- Clade: Embryophytes
- Clade: Tracheophytes
- Clade: Spermatophytes
- Clade: Angiosperms
- Clade: Eudicots
- Clade: Rosids
- Order: Myrtales
- Family: Melastomataceae
- Genus: Medinilla
- Species: M. acutialata

Binomial name
- Medinilla acutialata Pócs & Khoi

Species of flowering plants in the family Melastomataceae

Medinilla acutialata is a species of flowering plant in the genus Medinilla of the family Melastomataceae. It was first described by Tamás Pócs and Nguyên Dang Khôi in 1965. It has been found at altitudes of between 1700 and 1800 metres in the Hoàng Liên Sơn mountains in northwest Vietnam, as an epiphyte of Quercus oxyodon.

== See also ==
- List of Medinilla species
