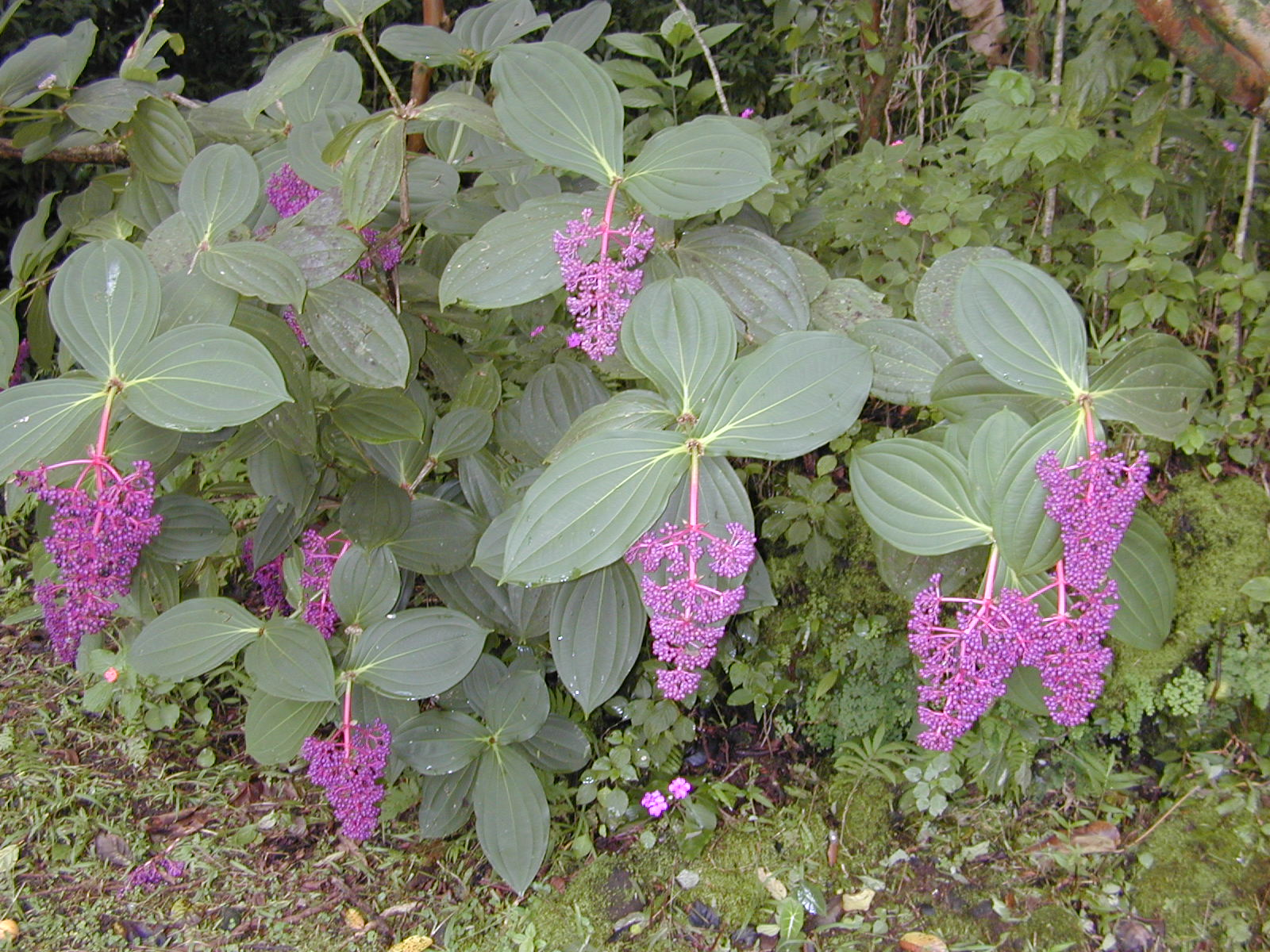
- Medinilla cumingii

Scientific classification
- Kingdom: Plantae
- Clade: Tracheophytes
- Clade: Angiosperms
- Clade: Eudicots
- Clade: Rosids
- Order: Myrtales
- Family: Melastomataceae
- Genus: Medinilla; Gaudich. ex DC.

Species
- About 370, see list of species

Synonyms
- Carionia Naudin; Cephalomedinilla Merr.; Dactyliota Blume; Diplogenea Lindl.; Erpetina Naudin; Hypenanthe Blume; Myrianthemum Gilg; Triplectrum D.Don ex Wight & Arn.

= Medinilla =

Genus of flowering plants

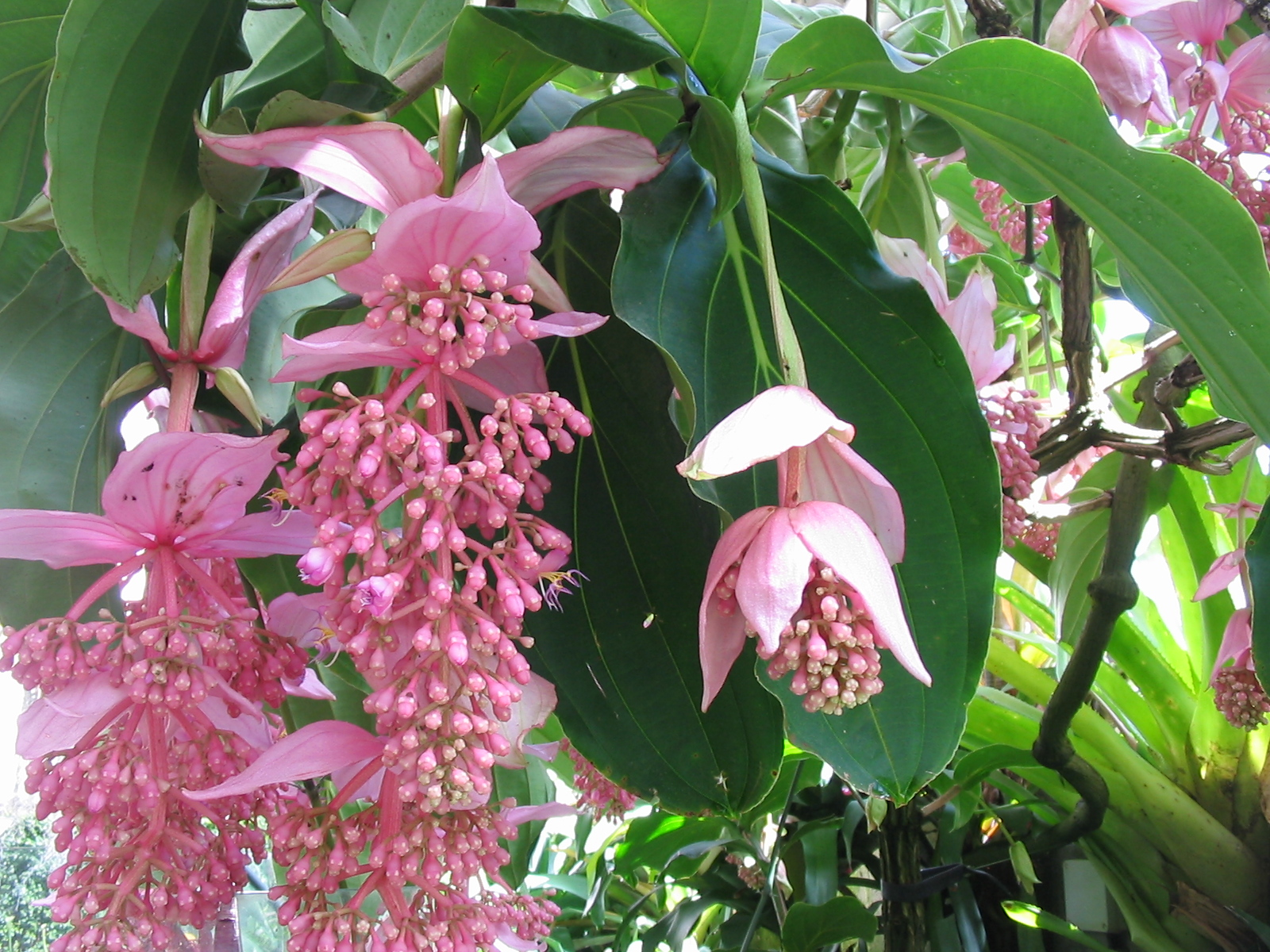
Medinilla magnifica is a popular ornamental plant endemic to the Luzon, Mindoro and Panay islands

Medinilla is a large paleotropical genus of about 370 species of flowering plants in the family Melastomataceae, native to tropical regions of the Old World from Africa east through southeast Asia to Australia and the western Pacific Ocean. The genus was named after José de Medinilla y Pineda, governor of the Mariana Islands in 1820.

Species in this genus are evergreen shrubs or vines. The leaves are opposite or whorled, or alternate in some species. The flowers are white, pink, red, or orange, and are produced singly or in large panicles.Certain Medinilla species have high economic value as they are used in medicinal and ornamental applications.

== Selected species ==
For a complete list of species, see List of Medinilla species

The following species have articles on Wikipedia:

- Medinilla acutialata Pócs & Khoi – Vietnam
- Medinilla acutissimifolia H.Perrier – Madagascar
- Medinilla afromontana Lebrun & Taton – East Tropical Africa region
- Medinilla aggregata Bakh.f. – Borneo
- Medinilla balls-headleyi F.Muell. – Queensland
- Medinilla beamanii Regalado – Borneo
- Medinilla cumingii Naudin – Philippines
- Medinilla magnifica Lindl. – Philippines
- Medinilla multiflora Merr. – Philippines
- Medinilla samoensis (Hochr.) Christoph. – Samoa
- Medinilla sedifolia Jum. & H.Perrier – Madagascar
- Medinilla speciosa Blume – Philippines
- Medinilla theresae Fernando – Philippines
- Medinilla waterhousei Seem. – Fiji
