= Medinilla afromontana =

Scientific classification
- Kingdom: Plantae
- Clade: Embryophytes
- Clade: Tracheophytes
- Clade: Spermatophytes
- Clade: Angiosperms
- Clade: Eudicots
- Clade: Rosids
- Order: Myrtales
- Family: Melastomataceae
- Genus: Medinilla
- Species: M. afromontana

Binomial name
- Medinilla afromontana Lebrun & Taton

Species of plant

Medinilla afromontana is a species of flowering plant in the genus Medinilla of the family Melastomataceae. It is an epiphyte found in the tropical rainforests of the East Tropical Africa region and Uganda, and was first described by Jean-Paul Lebrun and Auguste Taton in 1947.

== See also ==
- List of Medinilla species
