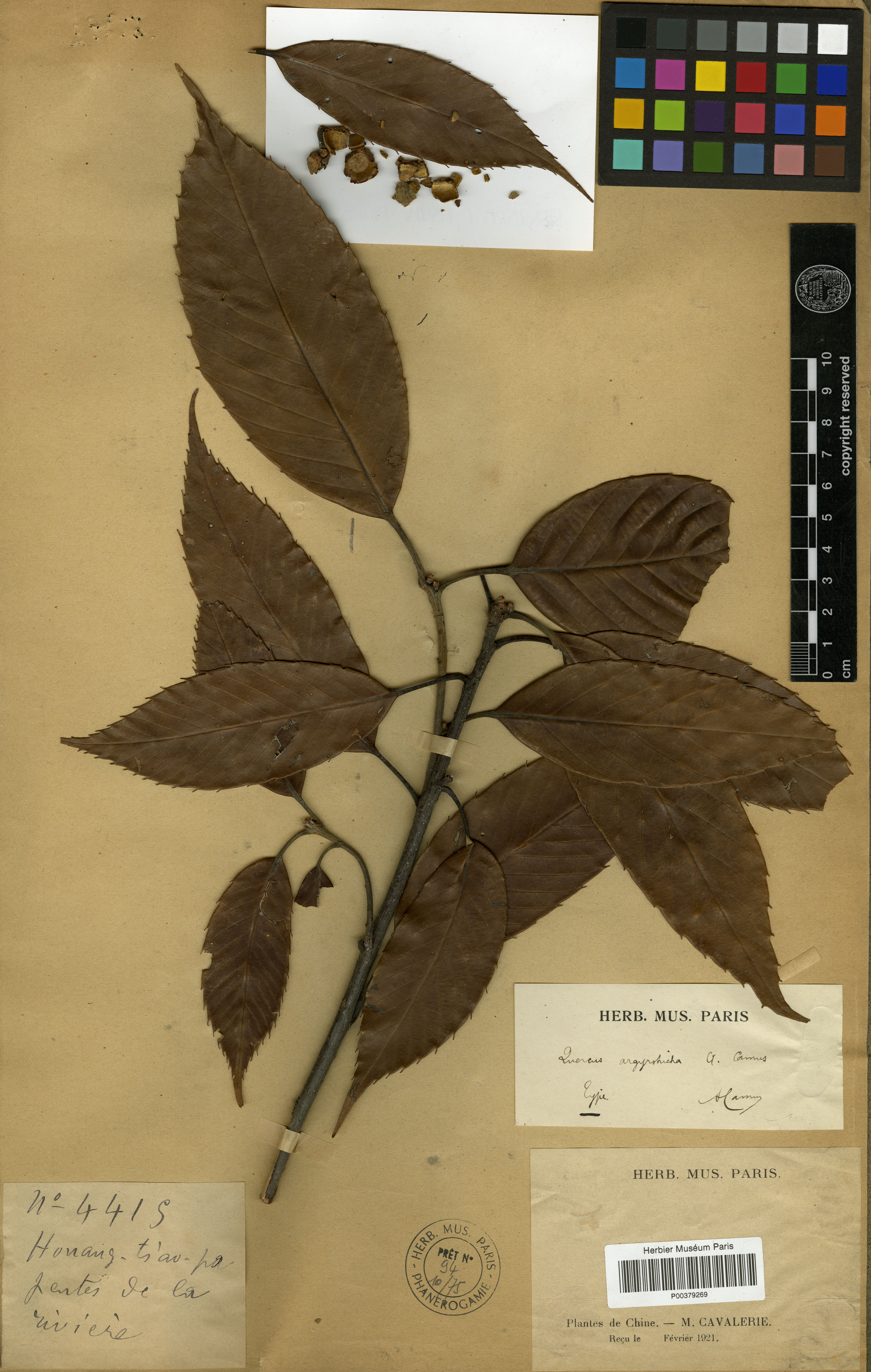

Conservation status
- Critically endangered, possibly extinct in the wild (IUCN 3.1)

Scientific classification
- Kingdom: Plantae
- Clade: Embryophytes
- Clade: Tracheophytes
- Clade: Spermatophytes
- Clade: Angiosperms
- Clade: Eudicots
- Clade: Rosids
- Order: Fagales
- Family: Fagaceae
- Genus: Quercus
- Subgenus: Quercus subg. Cerris
- Section: Quercus sect. Cyclobalanopsis
- Species: Q. argyrotricha

Binomial name
- Quercus argyrotricha A.Camus

Synonyms
- Cyclobalanopsis argyrotricha (A. Camus) Chun & Y.T. Chang ex Y.C. Hsu & H.Wei Jen

= Quercus argyrotricha =

Species of tree

Quercus argyrotricha is a rare Chinese species of trees in the beech family. It has been found only in Guizhou Province in southern China. The common name is Chinese for this species is gui zhou qing gang.

It is placed in subgenus Cerris, section Cyclobalanopsis.

Quercus argyrotricha is a tree with yellow twigs and leaves as much as 12 cm long. The tree can grow up to 10 meters or more. The leaves are leathery, 3 to 6 centimeters wide, and either oval or oval-elliptic in shape. The base is oblique and rounded. The leaves are also lustrous and glabrous above. But they are silvery stellate tomentose beneath. The leaves have between 9 and 14 pairs of secondary veins. The petiole is between 1 and 2 centimeters long. The acorns are mucronate, broadly ovoid or subglobose, and between 0.8 and 1.5 centimeters in diameter. The cupule are 0.5 to 0.7 centimeters long, 1 to 1.6 centimeters in diameter, and 2 millimeters thick. It is closely related to Quercus oxyodon.
