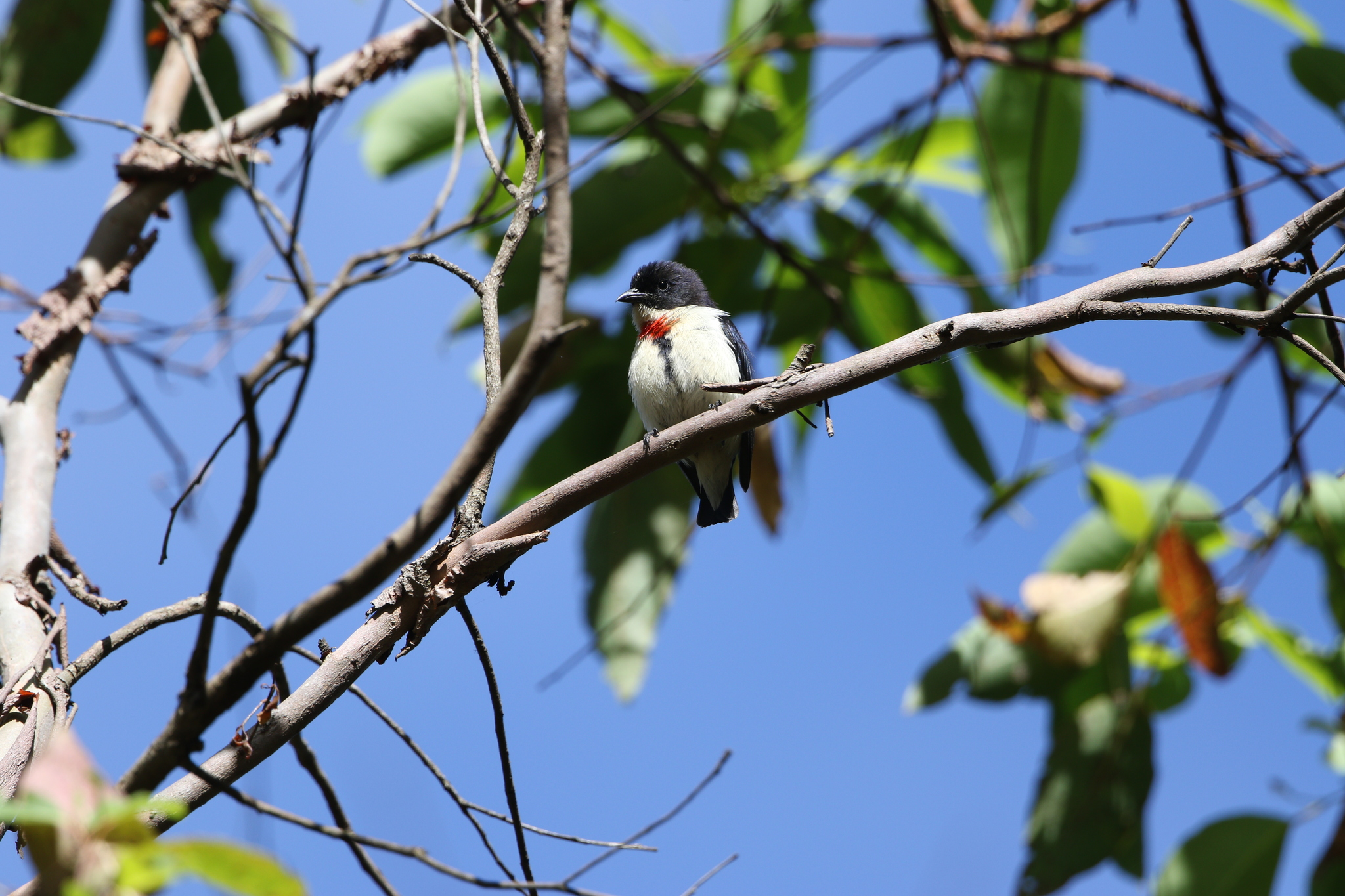

Conservation status
- Least Concern (IUCN 3.1)

Scientific classification
- Kingdom: Animalia
- Phylum: Chordata
- Class: Aves
- Order: Passeriformes
- Family: Dicaeidae
- Genus: Dicaeum
- Species: D. hanieli

Binomial name
- Dicaeum hanieli Hellmayr, 1912

= Timor flowerpecker =

Species of bird

The Timor flowerpecker (Dicaeum hanieli) is a species of passerine bird in the flowerpecker family Dicaeidae that is found on the island of Timor, one of the Lesser Sunda Islands. Its natural habitat is subtropical or tropical moist forest. It was formerly considered to be a subspecies of the blood-breasted flowerpecker, now renamed the Javan flowerpecker.

== Taxonomy ==
The Timor flowerpecker was formally described in 1912 by the Austrian ornithologist Carl Eduard Hellmayr from a specimen collected by the German zoologist Curt Berthold Haniel (1886–1951) at an altitude of 910 m (3,000 ft) on the island of Timor, one of the Lesser Sunda Islands. Hellmayr chose to honour the collector and coined the binomial name Dicaeum hanieli. The Timor flowerpercker was formerly treated as a subspecies of the blood-breasted flowerpecker, (renamed the Javan flowerpecker) but is now considered as a separate species based on the differences in plumage and vocalizations. The species is monotypic: no subspecies are recognised.
