= Medinilla aggregata =

Scientific classification
- Kingdom: Plantae
- Clade: Embryophytes
- Clade: Tracheophytes
- Clade: Spermatophytes
- Clade: Angiosperms
- Clade: Eudicots
- Clade: Rosids
- Order: Myrtales
- Family: Melastomataceae
- Genus: Medinilla
- Species: M. aggregata

Binomial name
- Medinilla aggregata Bakh.f.

Species of flowering plant

Medinilla aggregata is a species of flowering plant in the genus Medinilla of the family Melastomataceae. It is an epiphyte native to the tropical rainforests of Borneo, where it is endemic. The species was first described by the Dutch botanist Reinier Cornelis Bakhuizen van den Brink Jr. in 1943. Found near low-elevation rivers, M. aggregata takes the form of a shrub and flowers in June–July and November–December within its native range.

== Description ==
Medinilla aggregata is a flowering plant in the genus Medinilla, part of the dicotyledonous family Melastomataceae. The species takes the form of a shrub. The branches are robust and have a diameter of 1 cm (0.39 in) across. Leaves are oblong in shape, growing to between 23 cm (9.1 in) and 40 cm (16 in) long and between 11 cm (4.3 in) and 15 cm (5.9 in) wide. The leaves and stems are fleshy.

Flowering occurs twice annually in the native range of the species, in June–July and November–December. The inflorescences (flowering arrangements) of the species are terminal, as opposed to appearing in fascicles. These the high density of flowers within inflorescences on M. aggregata are diagnostic of the species. Each flower, borne on a pedicel between 10 mm (0.39 in) and 12 mm (0.47 in) long, possesses a calyx tube that is between 3 mm (0.12 in) and 4 mm (0.16 in) long. Each flower also has five white, obovate petals with dimensions of 5 mm (0.20 in) by 3 mm (0.12 in) and ten stamens that are 2 mm (0.079 in) to 3 mm (0.12 in) long.

Fruiting also occurs twice annually following flowering. These fruit are globose and range in color from orange to red. Each fruit produces many bright orange seeds that are 0.5 mm (0.020 in) long and ovoid. The seeds of M. aggregata and other closely related species are substantially larger than the seeds of other Bornean Medinilla.

== Taxonomy ==
Medinilla aggregata was first described by the Dutch botanist Reinier Cornelis Bakhuizen van den Brink (who shared his name with his father, also a botanist) in his 1943 work on Melastomataceae in the Malay Archipelago. The type specimen was collected by the Dutch geologist Louis Rutten at Samarinda. In 1990, as part of revision of Bornean Medinilla by the botanist Jacinto C. Regalado Jr., M. aggregata was six species assigned to a species group allied with M. succulenta. Distinguishing features of this group includes fleshy leaves and stems, as well as possessing substantially larger seeds than other groups.

== Distribution ==
Medinilla aggregata is endemic to the Maritime Southeast Asia island of Borneo. Specimens have been collected in the Indonesian province of East Kalimantan and the Malaysian state of Sabah. The species favors wet, tropical rainforest conditions. The species frequently establishes itself by rivers at altitudes between 30 m (98 ft) and 100 m (330 ft).

=== Conservation status ===
As of 2026, the Royal Botanic Gardens, Kew's Plants of the World Online predicted the conservation status of M. aggregata as threatened with confidence level of "confident".

== See also ==
- List of Medinilla species
