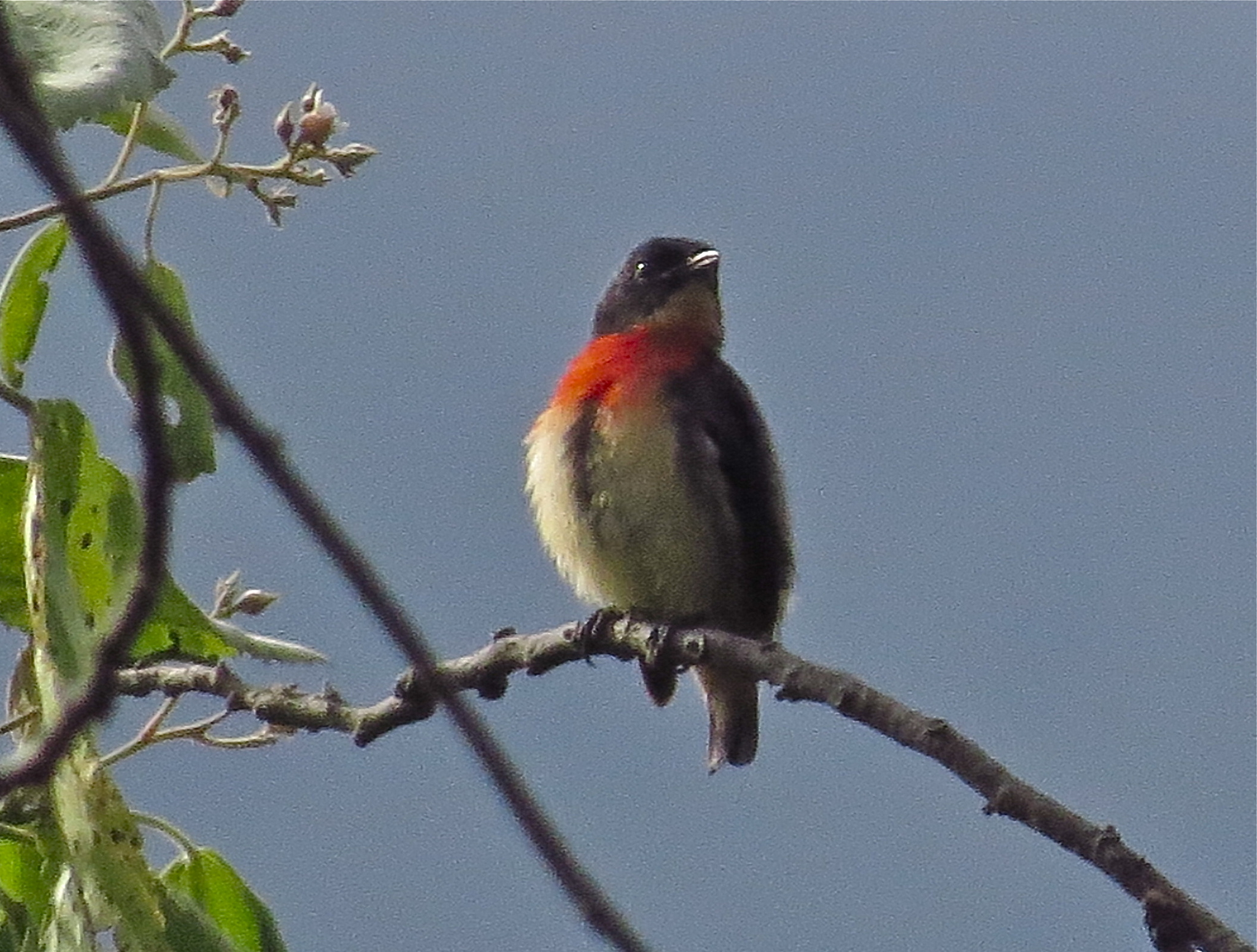

Conservation status
- Least Concern (IUCN 3.1)

Scientific classification
- Kingdom: Animalia
- Phylum: Chordata
- Class: Aves
- Order: Passeriformes
- Family: Dicaeidae
- Genus: Dicaeum
- Species: D. rhodopygiale

Binomial name
- Dicaeum rhodopygiale Rensch, 1928

= Flores flowerpecker =

Species of bird

The Flores flowerpecker (Dicaeum rhodopygiale) is a species of passerine bird in the flowerpecker family Dicaeidae that is found in mountainous regions of the Indonesian island of Flores, one of the Lesser Sunda Islands. Its natural habitats is subtropical or tropical moist montane forest. It was formerly considered to be a subspecies of the blood-breasted flowerpecker, now renamed the Javan flowerpecker.

== Taxonomy ==
The Flores flowerpecker was formally described in 1928 by the German ornithologist Bernhard Rensch from a specimen collected at an altitude on 1,200 m (3,900 ft) near Lake Ranamese on the Indonesian island of Flores. He considered it to be a subspecies of the blood-breasted flowerpecker (now the Javan flowerpecker) and coined the trinomial name Dicaeum sanguinolentum rhodopygiale. The specific epithet combines the Ancient Greek ῥοδον/rhodon meaning "rose" with -πυγιος/-pugios meaning "-rumped". The Flores flowerpecker is now considered as a separate species based on the differences in plumage and vocalizations. The species is monotypic: no subspecies are recognised.
