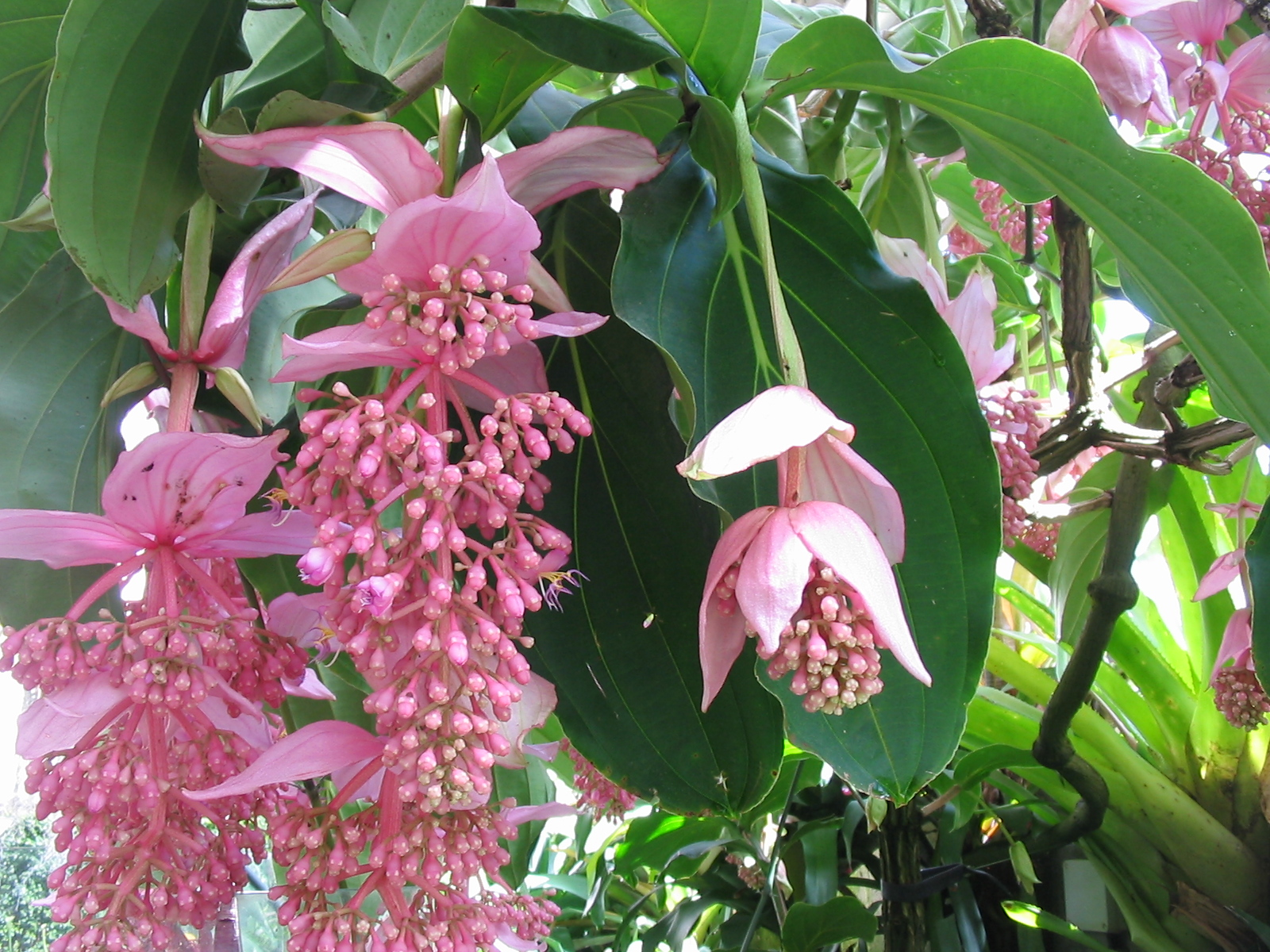

Scientific classification
- Kingdom: Plantae
- Clade: Tracheophytes
- Clade: Angiosperms
- Clade: Eudicots
- Clade: Rosids
- Order: Myrtales
- Family: Melastomataceae
- Genus: Medinilla
- Species: M. magnifica

Binomial name
- Medinilla magnifica Lindl., 1850

= Medinilla magnifica =

Species of flowering plant

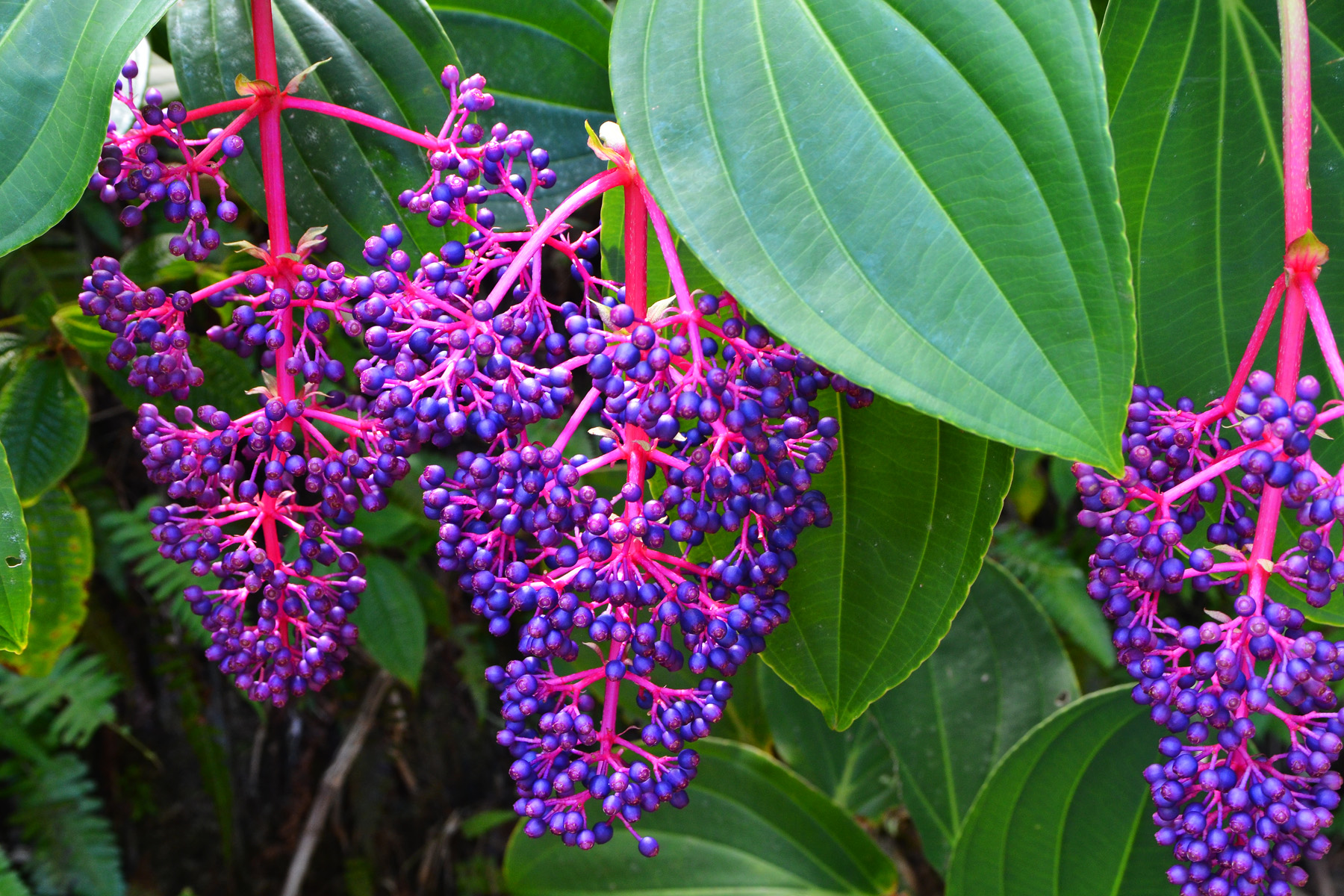
Medinilla magnifica Lindl. (Maui)

Medinilla magnifica, the showy medinilla or rose grape, is a species of epiphytic flowering plant, of the family Melastomataceae, native to the Philippines. Various cultivars and hybrids of this species, genus and family are well-known and have grown to be popular with plant collectors; the species Medinilla speciosa is equally as popular.

== Description ==
The plant grows up to 3 m tall, with opposite, firm, leathery leaves, which grow to 20–30 cm long in an ovate shape with a short point. The flowers grow in panicles up to 50 cm long, with ovid pink bracts. The individual flowers are up to 25 mm in size, and are pink, red or violet. The fruits are violet, fleshy berries, about 1 cm wide.

In the Philippines M. magnifica grows in the forks of large trees. It is an epiphyte, which is a plant that grows on other trees but does not withdraw its food from those trees as parasites do. As a fertilized seed, the plant initially finds itself deposited, or landing, into an area of accumulated leaf debris, moss and other plant detritus in the crook of a larger tree or plant. From there, it sprouts new growth and begins to root and anchor itself, drawing nutrition from the decaying detritus around its base.

== Cultivation ==
In the tropics, it is grown as a perennial. It is also a common house plant in cooler climes. King Baudouin of Belgium was a big devotee of Medinilla. He grew them in the royal conservatories and they were depicted on the bank note of 10,000 Belgian francs.

In temperate zones, medinillas must be grown as indoor houseplant specimens or kept under protection all year round, as they will not survive temperatures dropping below 15 °C (59 °F). In USDA hardiness zones 10–12, it is possible to keep them outside all year, albeit under protection from excess hot sun, wind and cold. The plant requires high humidity levels, and prefers bright but indirect light, with shading and protection from the sun (especially at the hottest time of the day). It has gained the Royal Horticultural Society's Award of Garden Merit.

== Etymology ==
Medinilla is named for José de Medinilla y Pineda, who was governor of Mariana Islands in 1820. Epithet magnifica means 'magnificent', 'great', 'eminent', or 'distinguished'.
