= Medinilla acutissimifolia =

Scientific classification
- Kingdom: Plantae
- Clade: Embryophytes
- Clade: Tracheophytes
- Clade: Spermatophytes
- Clade: Angiosperms
- Clade: Eudicots
- Clade: Rosids
- Order: Myrtales
- Family: Melastomataceae
- Genus: Medinilla
- Species: M. acutissimifolia

Binomial name
- Medinilla acutissimifolia H.Perrier

Species of plant

Medinilla acutissimifolia is a species of flowering plant in the genus Medinilla of the family Melastomataceae. It is an epiphyte found in Madagascar, and was first described by Henri Perrier de la Bâthie in 1932.

== See also ==
- List of Medinilla species
