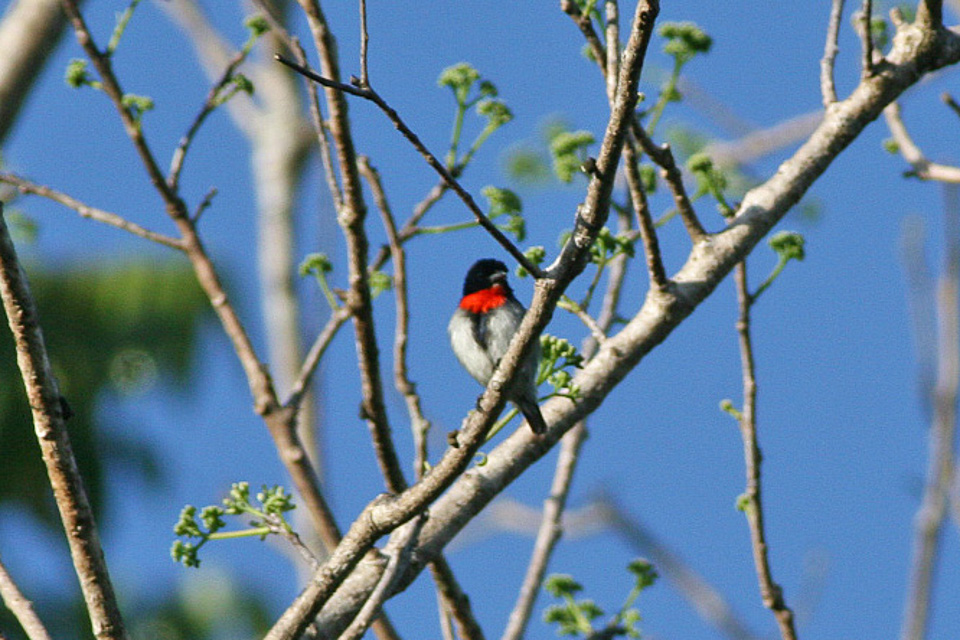

Conservation status
- Least Concern (IUCN 3.1)

Scientific classification
- Kingdom: Animalia
- Phylum: Chordata
- Class: Aves
- Order: Passeriformes
- Family: Dicaeidae
- Genus: Dicaeum
- Species: D. wilhelminae

Binomial name
- Dicaeum wilhelminae Büttikofer, 1892

= Sumba flowerpecker =

Species of bird

The Sumba flowerpecker (Dicaeum wilhelminae) is a species of passerine bird in the flowerpecker family Dicaeidae that is found on the Indonesian island of Sumba, one of the Lesser Sunda Islands. Its natural habitat is subtropical or tropical moist forest. It was formerly considered to be a subspecies of the blood-breasted flowerpecker, now renamed the Javan flowerpecker.

== Taxonomy ==
The Sumba flowerpecker was formally described in 1892 by the Swiss zoologist Johann Büttikofer based on a specimen collected on the Indonesian island of Sumba. He coined the binomial name Dicaeum wilhelminae. The specific epithet was chosen to honour the young queen Wilhelmina of the Netherlands. The Sumba flowerpecker was formerly treated as a subspecies of the blood-breasted flowerpecker, (renamed the Javan flowerpecker) but is now considered as a separate species based on the differences in plumage and vocalizations. The species is monotypic: no subspecies are recognised.
