= Medinilla samoensis =

Scientific classification
- Kingdom: Plantae
- Clade: Tracheophytes
- Clade: Angiosperms
- Clade: Eudicots
- Clade: Rosids
- Order: Myrtales
- Family: Melastomataceae
- Genus: Medinilla
- Species: M. samoensis

Binomial name
- Medinilla samoensis (Hochr.) Christoph.

Synonyms
- Medinilla amoena var. samoensis Hochr.; Medinilla racemosa H.St.John

Species of flowering plant

Medinilla samoensis is a species of flowering plant in the family Melastomataceae, native to the Samoan Islands. It grows as a high-climbing woody vine within the wet, humid canopy biomes of tropical forests across islands such as Savai'i and Upolu.

The species was originally described in 1925 by Swiss botanist Bénédict Pierre Georges Hochreutiner as a variety, Medinilla amoena var. samoensis. It was later elevated to a distinct species status by Norwegian botanist Erling Christophersen in 1938.

== See also ==
- Flora of Samoa
- Samoan tropical moist forests
