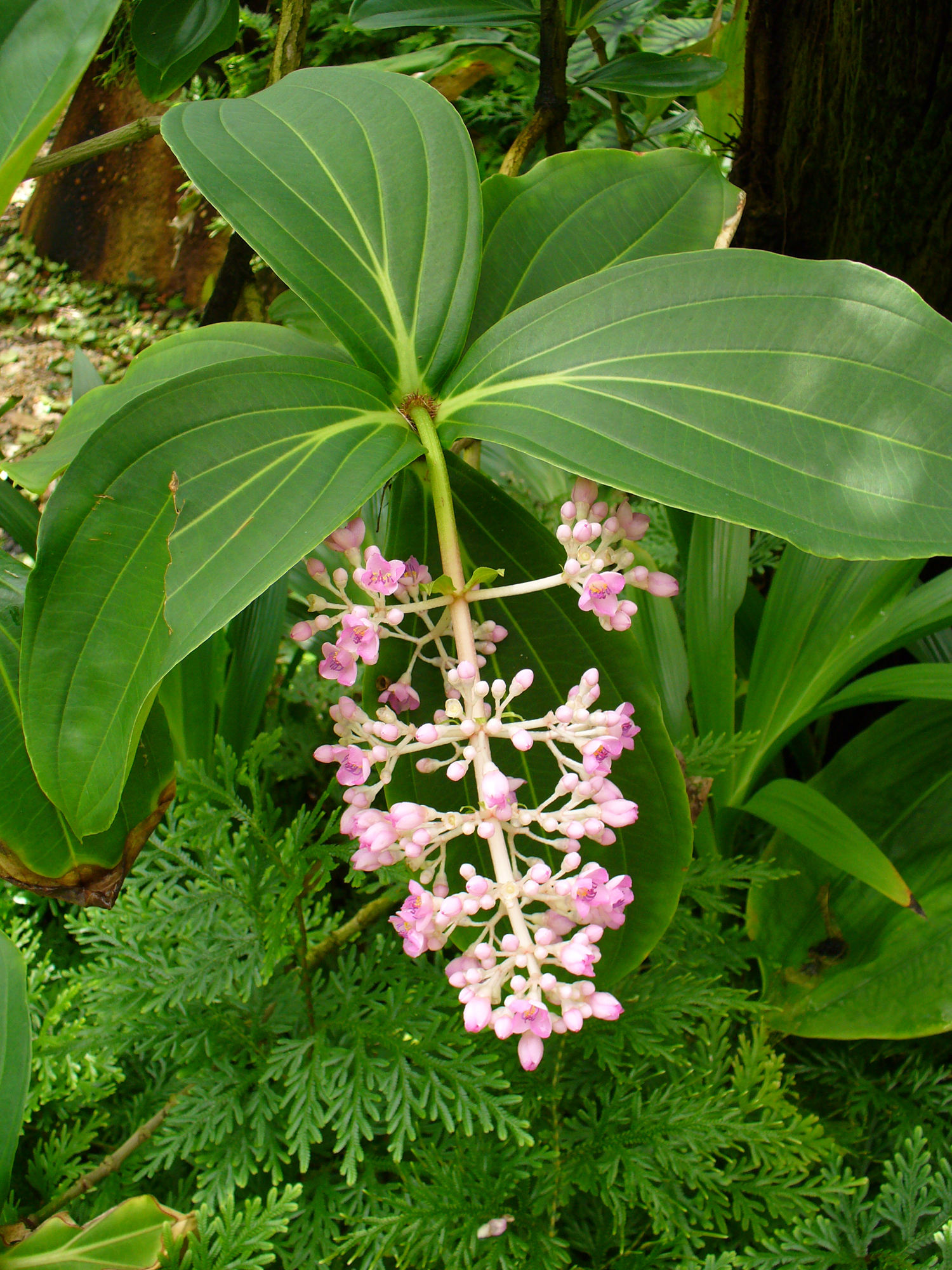
- Cultivated at the Wertheim Conservatory, Florida International University campus, Miami, FL USA

Scientific classification
- Kingdom: Plantae
- Clade: Tracheophytes
- Clade: Angiosperms
- Clade: Eudicots
- Clade: Rosids
- Order: Myrtales
- Family: Melastomataceae
- Genus: Medinilla
- Species: M. multiflora

Binomial name
- Medinilla multiflora Merr. (1905)

Synonyms
- Medinilla camiguinensis Merr. (1906); Medinilla canlaonensis Merr. (1906); Medinilla confusa Merr. (1906); Medinilla myriantha Merr. (1906); Medinilla negrosensis Merr. (1906); Medinilla vulcanica Merr. (1906)

= Medinilla multiflora =

Species of flowering plant

Medinilla multiflora is a species of semi-epiphytic plant endemic to the Philippines. These plants grow up to 4 m (13 ft) tall and produce pink flowers which develop into magenta or reddish fruits. It flowers year-round, peaking at around May and June.

It is also known erroneously as the "Malaysian orchid" in the ornamental plant trade (usually under its synonym Medinilla myriantha), but it is not an orchid and it is not native to Malaysia.
