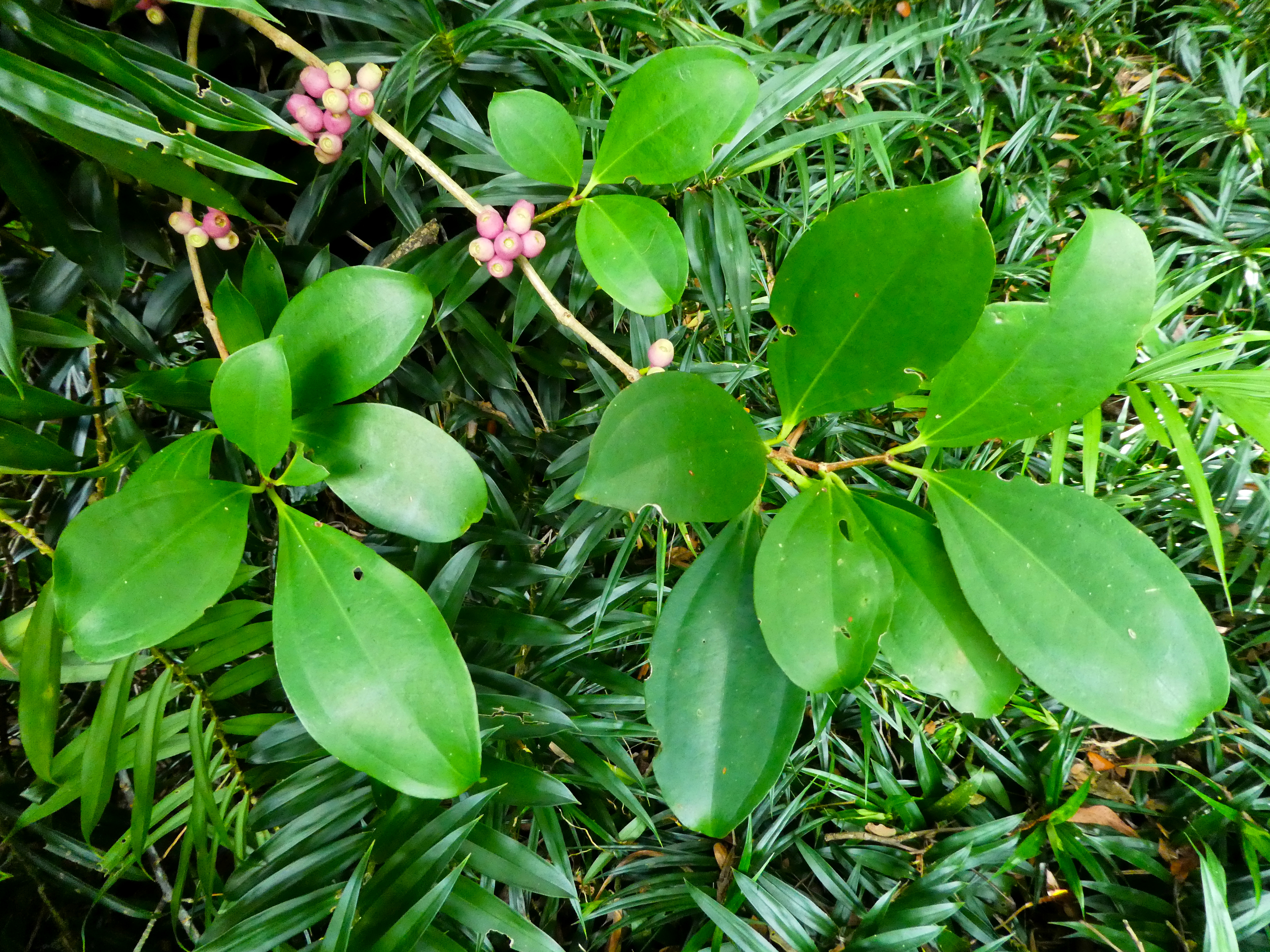

Conservation status
- Least Concern (NCA)

Scientific classification
- Kingdom: Plantae
- Clade: Tracheophytes
- Clade: Angiosperms
- Clade: Eudicots
- Clade: Rosids
- Order: Myrtales
- Family: Melastomataceae
- Genus: Medinilla
- Species: M. balls-headleyi

Binomial name
- Medinilla balls-headleyi F.Muell.

= Medinilla balls-headleyi =

Daintree medinilla

Species of flowering plants

Medinilla balls-headleyi, commonly known as Daintree medinilla, is a climbing plant in the family Melastomataceae found only in the Wet Tropics bioregion of Queensland, Australia.

It is a root climber with a stem diameter of up to 5 cm (2.0 in). Flowers and fruit are borne in clusters on the twigs behind the leaves. It was first described in 1887 by the German-born Australian botanist Ferdinand von Mueller

== Conservation ==
This species is listed as least concern under the Queensland Government's Nature Conservation Act. As of 20 October 2024, it has not been assessed by the International Union for Conservation of Nature (IUCN).

== Gallery ==
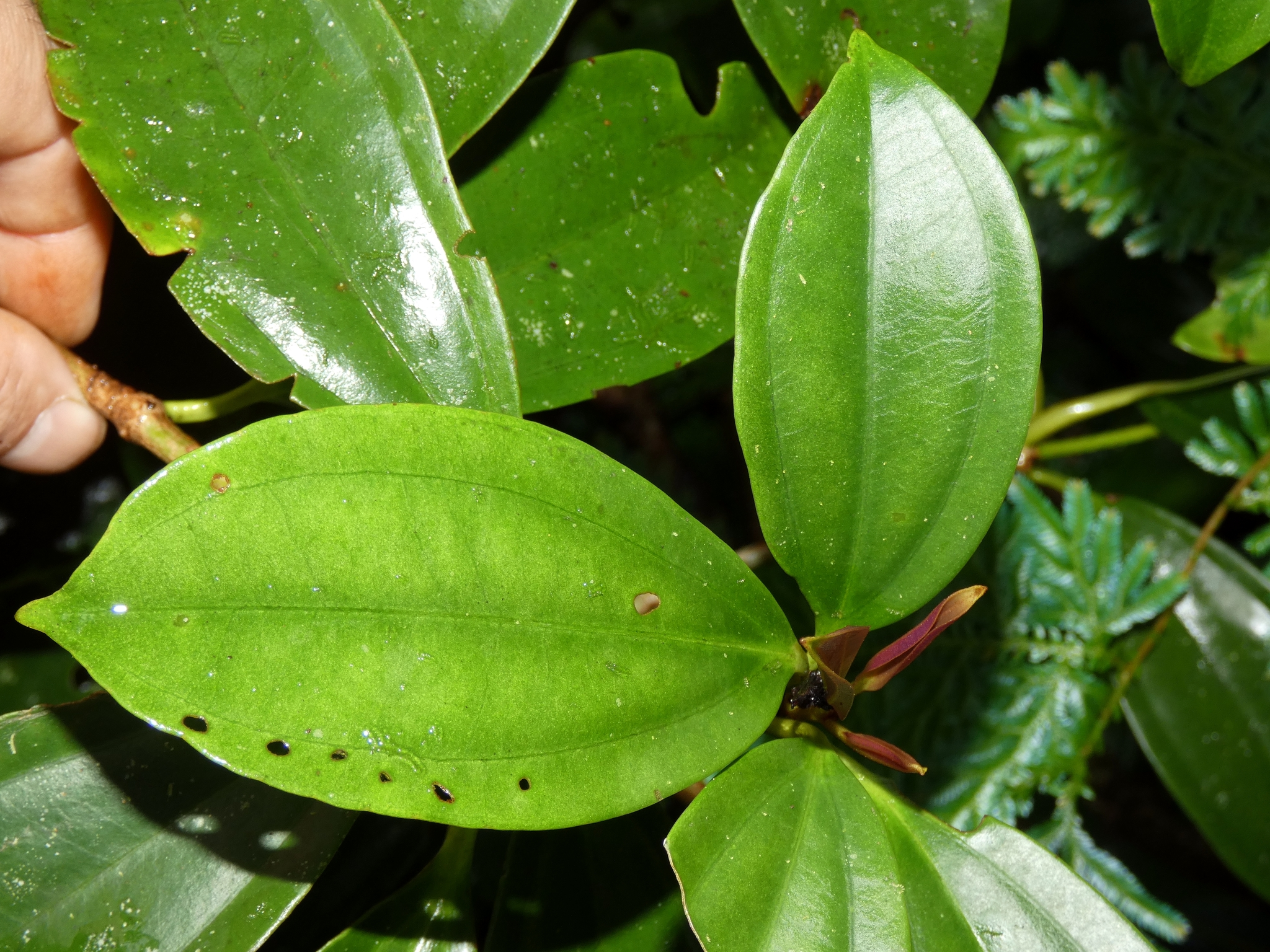
Foliage

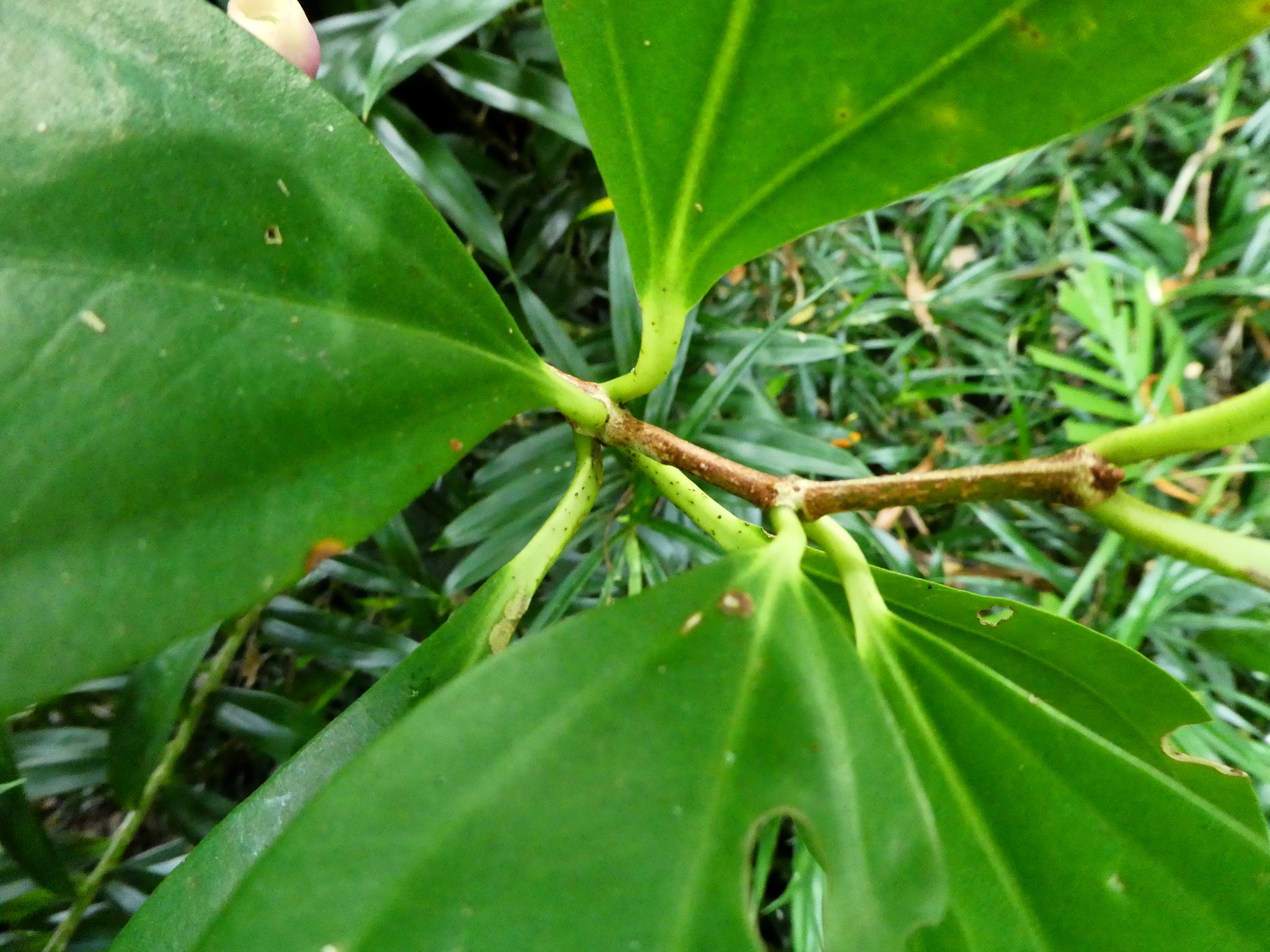

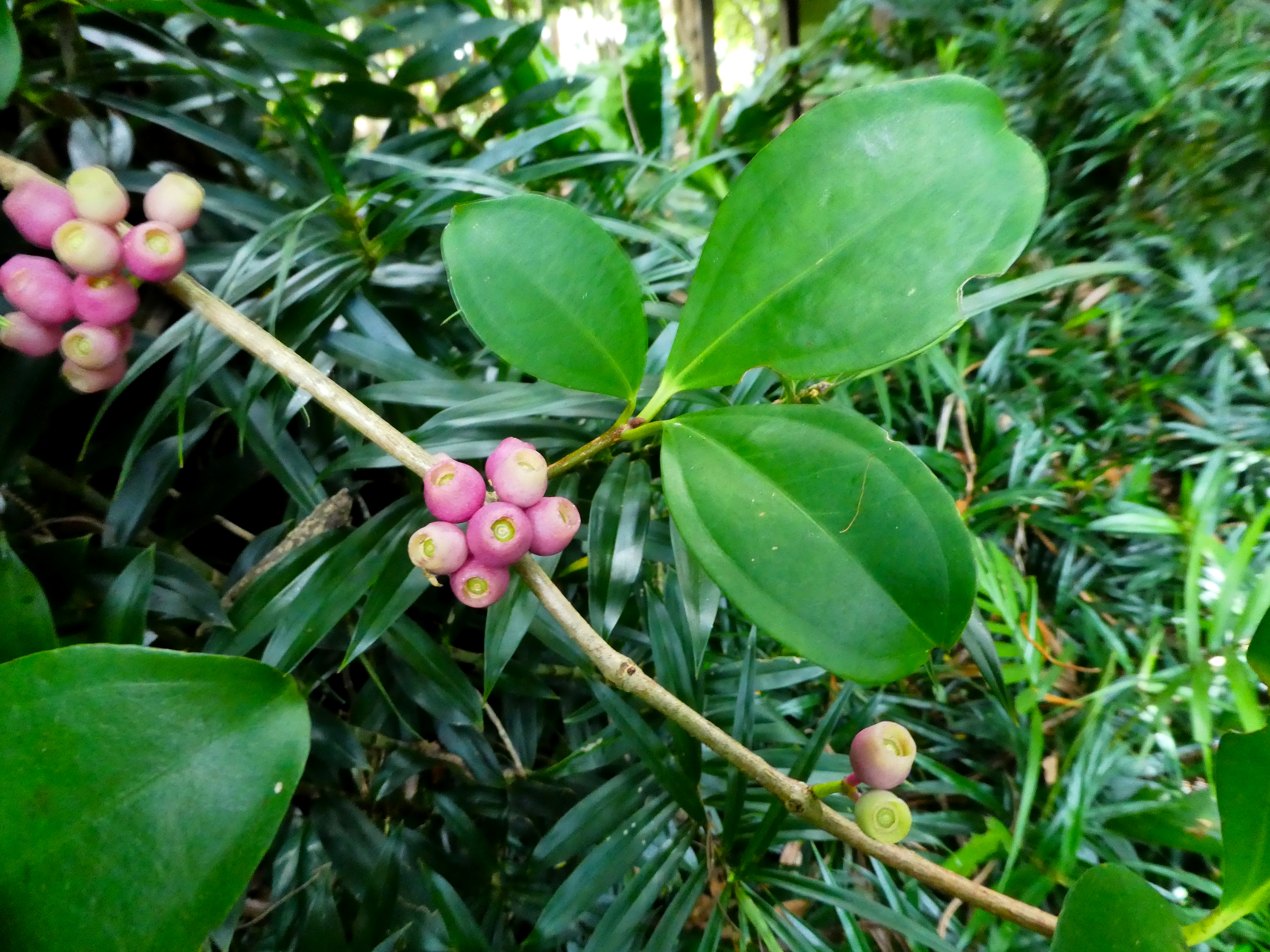
Fruit

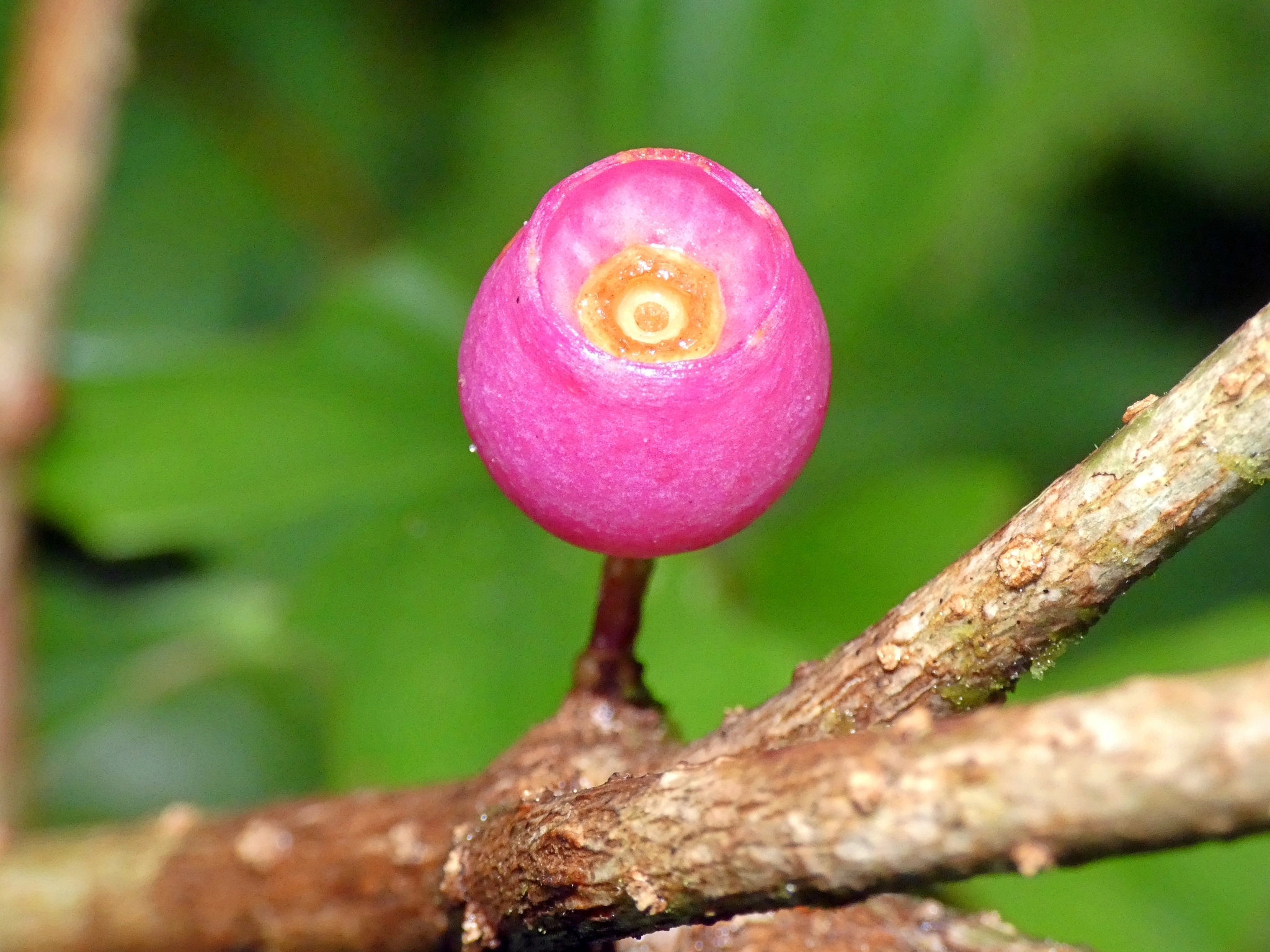
Fruit detail
