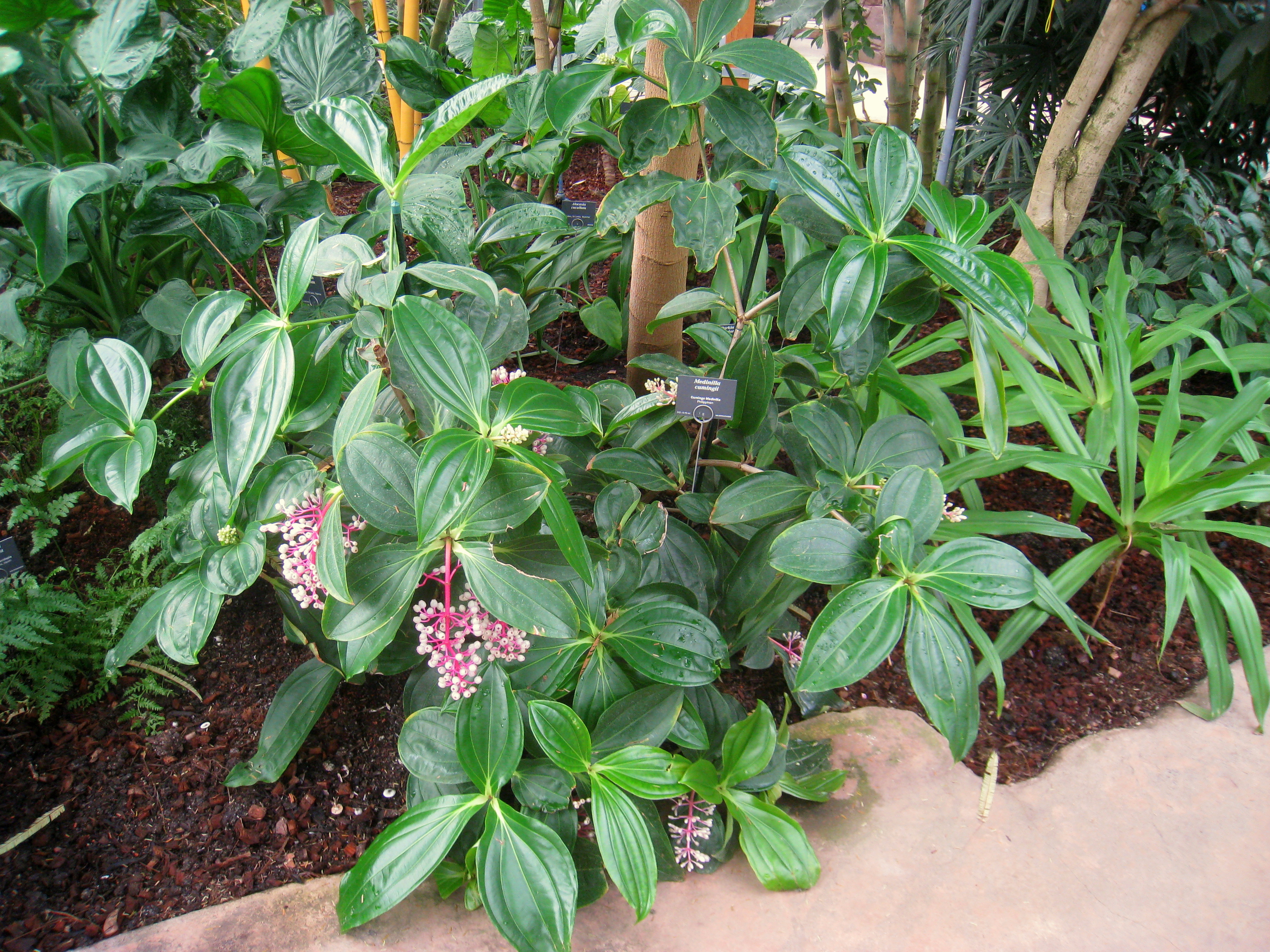
- Berlin Botanical Garden

Scientific classification
- Kingdom: Plantae
- Clade: Tracheophytes
- Clade: Angiosperms
- Clade: Eudicots
- Clade: Rosids
- Order: Myrtales
- Family: Melastomataceae
- Genus: Medinilla
- Species: M. cumingii

Binomial name
- Medinilla cumingii Naudin

Synonyms
- Medinilla peninsula Elmer; Medinilla speciosa Hook.; Medinilla vanoverberghii Merr.

= Medinilla cumingii =

Species of flowering plant

Medinilla cumingii, the chandelier tree, is a species of flowering plant in the family Melastomataceae, native to mossy forest in the Philippines at 700–1,000 m (2,300–3,300 ft) altitude. It is a small shrub, 1–2 m (3.3–6.6 ft) in height, with ternate or quaternate leaves, and many-flowered, pendant panicles up to 25 cm (9.8 in) long. Fruits are 5–7 mm (0.2–0.3 in) in diameter, pink to purplish to bluish-black when ripe.

== Etymology ==
Medinilla is named for José de Medinilla y Pineda, who was governor of the Mariana Islands in 1820. The species epithet cumingii was given for Hugh Cuming, a botanical collector.
