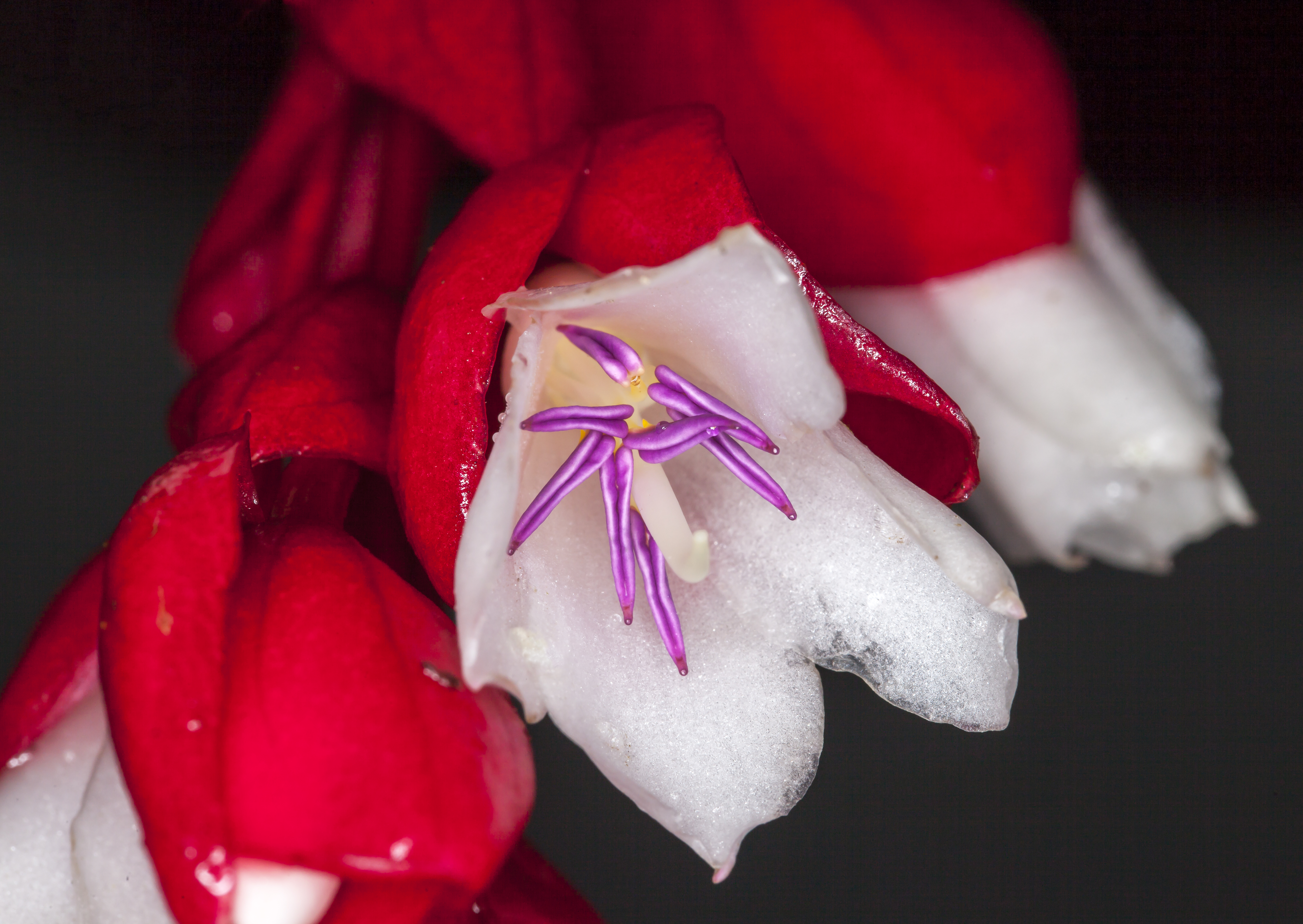

Scientific classification
- Kingdom: Plantae
- Clade: Tracheophytes
- Clade: Angiosperms
- Clade: Eudicots
- Clade: Rosids
- Order: Myrtales
- Family: Melastomataceae
- Genus: Medinilla
- Species: M. waterhousei

Binomial name
- Medinilla waterhousei Seem.

= Medinilla waterhousei =

Tagimaucia

Species of plant

Medinilla waterhousei, commonly known as tagimaucia or tagimoucia ([ˈtaŋimouðia], tahng-ee-mow-theea), is a species of flowering plant in the family Melastomataceae which is endemic to the highland rainforest of the Fijian island of Taveuni. It is a liana bearing crimson and white flowers in 30 cm-long hanging clusters. It only grows at altitudes of over 600 m, flowering from October to December. The flower is the floral emblem of Fiji. The flower is now represented on the Fiji $50 note replacing the queen.

== Legend ==
A local romantic legend attached to the flower has it representing the tears of a young girl forbidden by her father to marry the boy of her dreams so as she wept her tears became the flower hence from the phrase tagi me uci ‘ea ("cry to be like her"). The girl was said to be the daughter of a chief either Tui Cakau or Tui Lekutu. This is immortalized in a popular Fijian folk song by Percy Bucknell titled Tagimoucia ga ("Such is the Tagimoucia").

== Etymology ==
Medinilla is named for José de Medinilla y Pineda, who was governor of Mauritius (then known as the Marianne Islands) in 1820.
