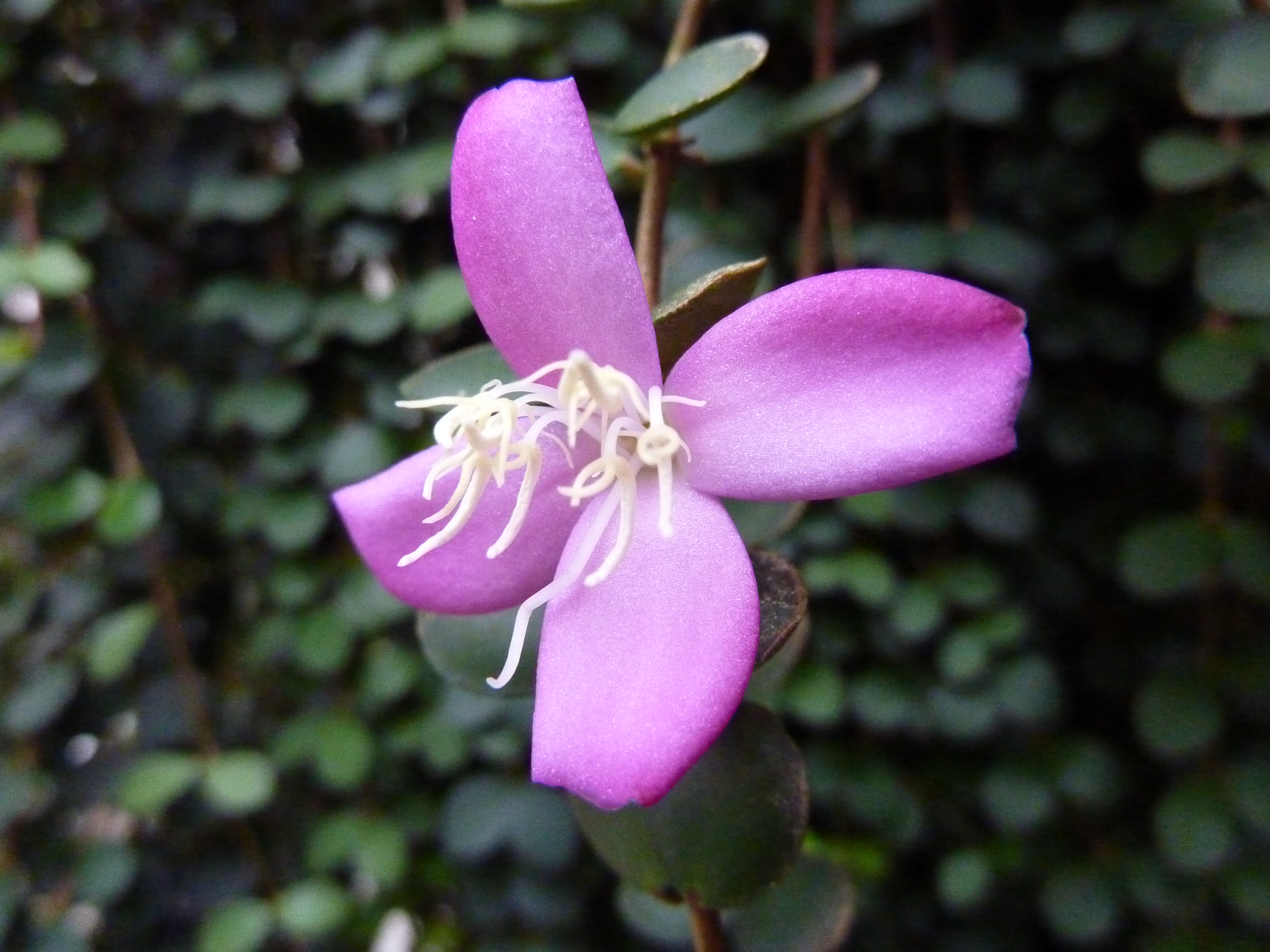

Scientific classification
- Kingdom: Plantae
- Clade: Tracheophytes
- Clade: Angiosperms
- Clade: Eudicots
- Clade: Rosids
- Order: Myrtales
- Family: Melastomataceae
- Genus: Medinilla
- Species: M. sedifolia

Binomial name
- Medinilla sedifolia Jum. & H.Perrier

= Medinilla sedifolia =

Species of flowering plant

Medinilla sedifolia is a perennial plant of the family Melastomataceae that grows primarily in Madagascar, but is occasionally used as a terrarium plant, an epiphyte mounting, or in hanging pots. It is small for the genus, growing only 75–150 mm (3–6 in) tall. The waxy evergreen leaves grow on a trailing stem. It flowers twice per year, the five petaled flowers are magenta, waxy to the touch, and about 15 mm (1/2 in) wide when fully grown.

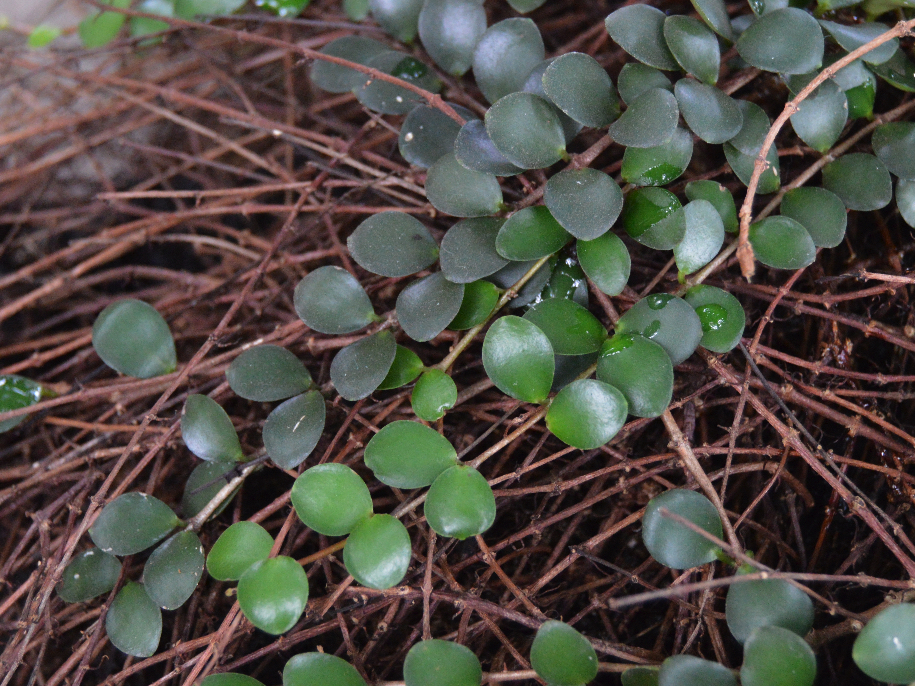
Stem and waxy leaves of Medinilla sedifolia

== Etymology ==
Medinilla is named for José de Medinilla y Pineda, who was governor of Mauritius (then known as the Marianne Islands) in 1820.
