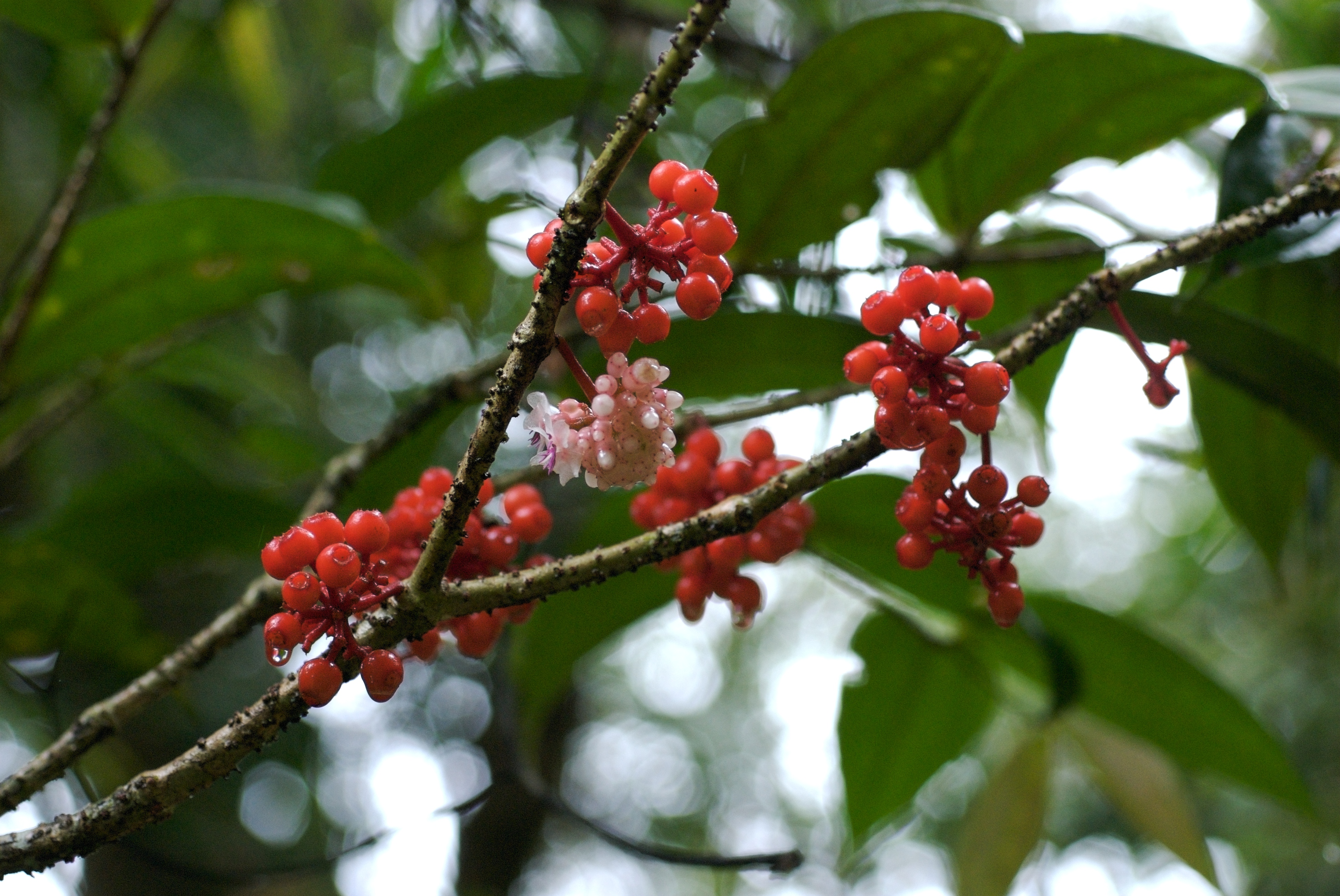
- Berries of Medinilla beamanii

Scientific classification
- Kingdom: Plantae
- Clade: Embryophytes
- Clade: Tracheophytes
- Clade: Angiosperms
- Clade: Eudicots
- Clade: Rosids
- Order: Myrtales
- Family: Melastomataceae
- Genus: Medinilla
- Species: M. beamanii

Binomial name
- Medinilla beamanii J.C.Regalado

= Medinilla beamanii =

Species of flowering plant

Medinilla beamanii is a species in the genus Medinilla of the family Melastomataceae.

== Etymology ==
Medinilla is named for José de Medinilla y Pineda, who was governor of Mauritius (then known as the Marianne Islands) in 1820. The species is named after John H. Beaman who first collected it in flower.

== Description ==
Medinilla beamanii is a large evergreen shrub. The bright pink small flowers are produced in large panicles on pendant reddish stems. Fruits are rounded pink berries turning reddish when ripe.

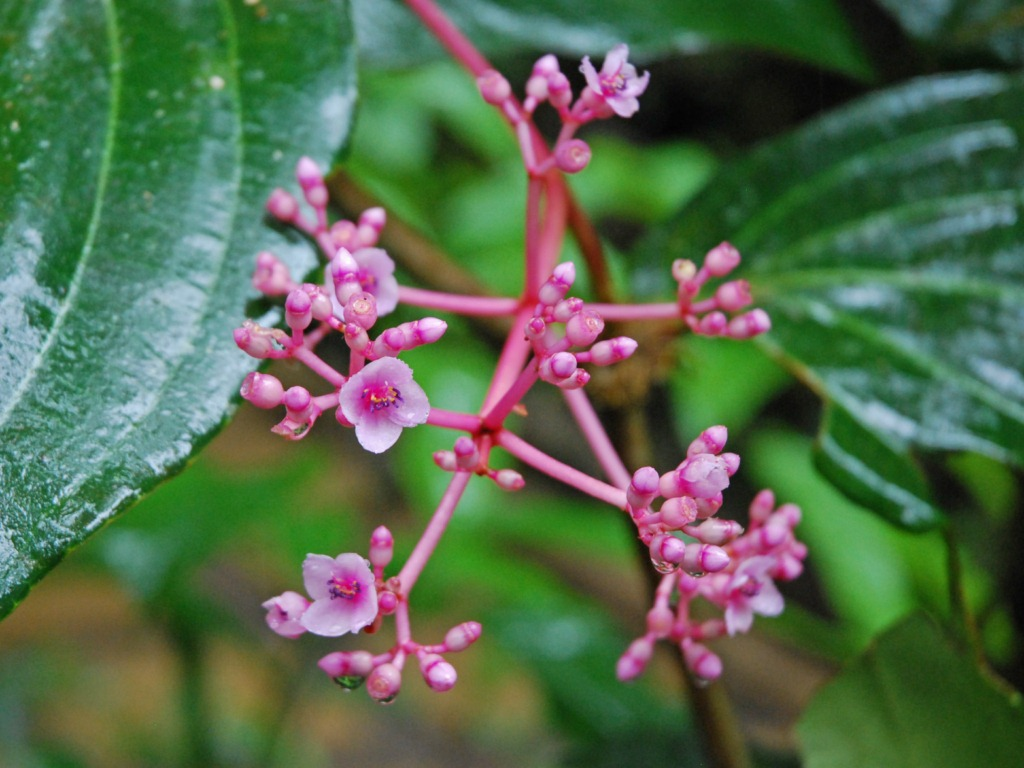
Flowers of Medinilla beamanii in Kinabalu Botanical Garden, Sabah

== Distribution ==
This plant is native to the island of Borneo.

== Habitat ==
This species is typical of the shaded mountain rainforests and prefers moist, well-draining soils, at an altitude of 300–1,700 metres (980–5,580 ft) above sea level.
