= Medinilla theresae =

Scientific classification
- Kingdom: Plantae
- Clade: Tracheophytes
- Clade: Angiosperms
- Clade: Eudicots
- Clade: Rosids
- Order: Myrtales
- Family: Melastomataceae
- Genus: Medinilla
- Species: M. theresae

Binomial name
- Medinilla theresae Edwino S. Fernando

Species of shrub

Medinilla theresae is an endemic species of flowering evergreen shrub or liana in the family Melastomataceae, occurring on ultramafic soils on the dwarf forests of Mt. Redondo, Dinagat Island at 700-840 elevation, and at Mt. Hamiguitan, Philippines at growing at 900 m elevation on the edges of upper montane forest, which reaches up to the 'mossy-pygmy' forest with elevation ranges of 1160−1200 m and 1460−1600 m elevation, respectively. This terrestrial, cauliflorous shrub can grow erect at 1.5 m high. The species whorled leaves, flowers which are 4-merous, and the pendulous inflorescences likened the species to M. pendula. However, it differed from the latter on distinct secondary veins on the leaves adaxial surface, the inflorescences which are cauline or axillary, and its straight anthers.

== Etymology ==
The species was named in honor of Theresa Mundita Lim, a wildlife advocate, and a former director of the Biodiversity Management Bureau of the Department of Environment and Natural Resources.
