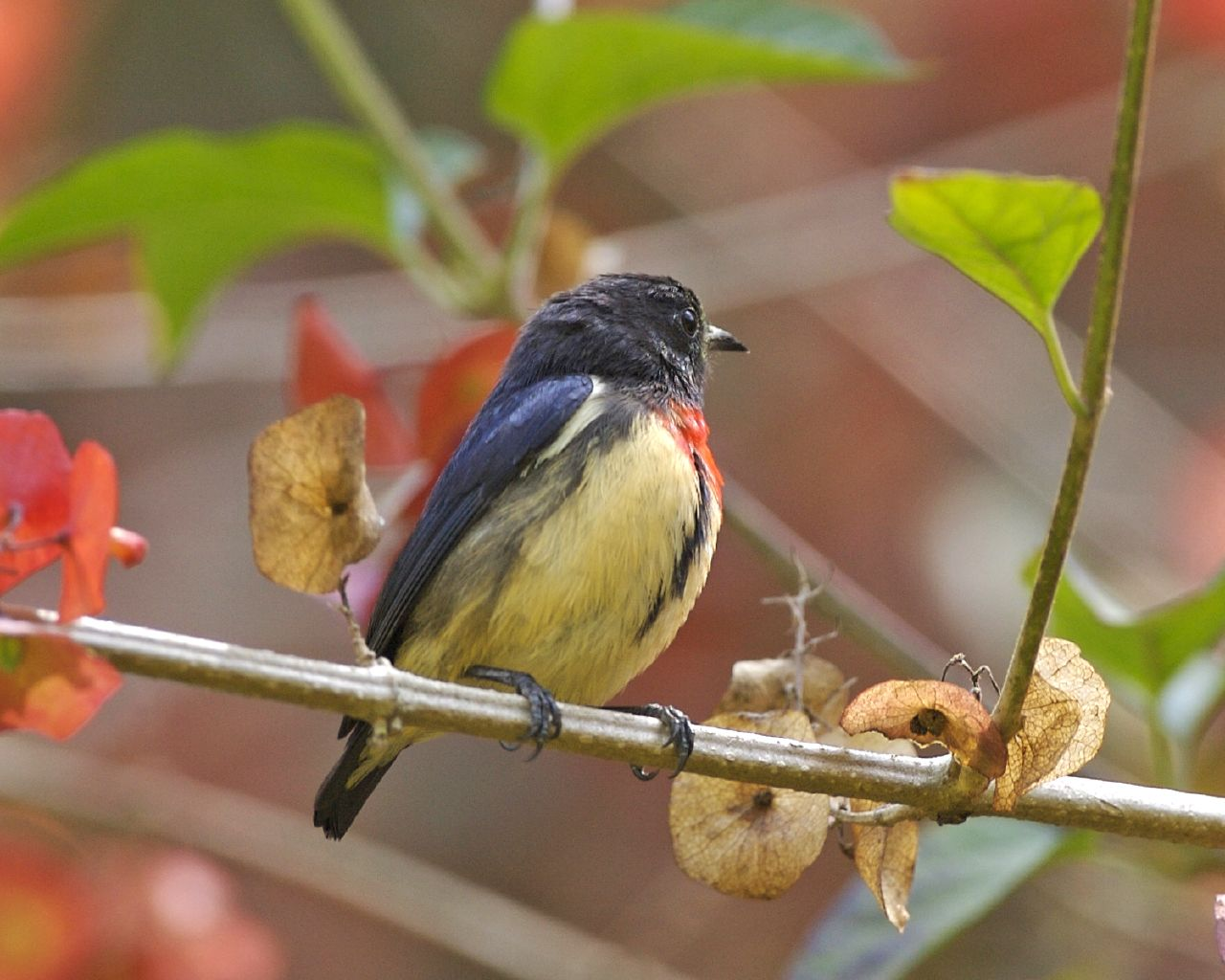

Conservation status
- Least Concern (IUCN 3.1)

Scientific classification
- Kingdom: Animalia
- Phylum: Chordata
- Class: Aves
- Order: Passeriformes
- Family: Dicaeidae
- Genus: Dicaeum
- Species: D. sanguinolentum

Binomial name
- Dicaeum sanguinolentum Temminck, 1829

= Javan flowerpecker =

Species of bird

The Javan flowerpecker (Dicaeum sanguinolentum), formerly named the blood-breasted flowerpecker, is a species of passerine bird in the flowerpecker family Dicaeidae. It is found on the Indonesian islands of Java and Bali in the Lesser Sunda Islands. Its natural habitats are subtropical or tropical moist lowland forest and subtropical or tropical moist montane forest. It was formerly considered to be conspecific with the Flores, Sumba, and Timor flowerpeckers.

== Taxonomy ==
The Javan flowerpecker was formally described and illustrated in 1829 by the Dutch zoologist Coenraad Jacob Temminck based on a specimen that had been collected on the Indonesian island of Java by Heinrich Kuhl and Johan Conrad van Hasselt. Temminck coined the binomial name Dicaeum sanguinolentum. The specific epithet is from Latin sanguinolentus meaning "bloody". The Flores, Sumba, and Timor flowerpeckers were formerly considered as subspecies but are now treated as separate species based on the differences in plumage and vocalizations. The English name was changed from "blood-breasted flowerpecker" to "Javan flowerpecker" to reflect the reduced range.
