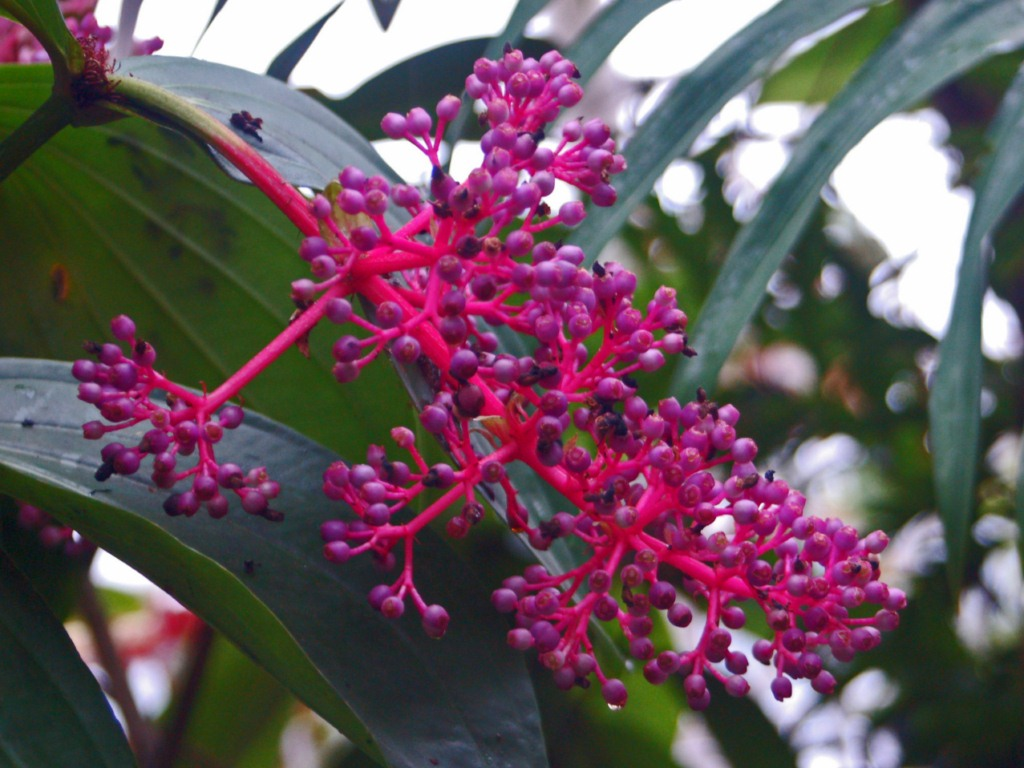
- The berry-bearing raceme of Medinilla speciosa

Scientific classification
- Kingdom: Plantae
- Clade: Tracheophytes
- Clade: Angiosperms
- Clade: Eudicots
- Clade: Rosids
- Order: Myrtales
- Family: Melastomataceae
- Genus: Medinilla
- Species: M. speciosa

Binomial name
- Medinilla speciosa Reinw. ex Blume

Synonyms
- Medinilla speciosa var. genuina Hochr., Candollea; Medinilla speciosa f. rubriflora Hochr., Candollea; Medinilla speciosa var. minoriflora Hochr., Candollea

= Medinilla speciosa =

Species of flowering plant

Medinilla speciosa is a perennial epiphytic plant in the genus Medinilla of the family Melastomataceae.

== Etymology ==
Medinilla is named for José de Medinilla y Pineda, who was governor of Mauritius (then known as the Marianne Islands) in 1820.

== Description ==
Medinilla speciosa reaches on average a height of 45–60 centimetres (18–24 in). This evergreen shrub has woody branched stems and opposite leathery green leaves (up to 20 centimetres (7.9 in) long and 15 centimetres (5.9 in)wide, with prominent veins. The dainty small flowers are bright pink-colored and are produced in large panicles on pendant reddish stems. The flowering period extends from early Summer to Fall. When the blooming is finished for about a month remains a raceme of showy berries, pending that the plant reflowers. These rounded fruits are at first pink and purple-blue when ripe (hence the common name of Showy Asian Grapes.

The plant is utilized as a traditional medicine, by boiling, brewing, or consuming it directly. The fruits are consumed by pregnant women as a health supplement and also used as diarrhea, mouth sores, anti-inflammatory, anticancer, and antibacterial treatment.

== Distribution ==
This plant occurs naturally in Borneo, Java and the Philippines. In Borneo, the plant can be found at the Kinabalu in the Malaysian part of the island. Its distribution includes peninsular Malaysia (Penang, Perak, Pahang, Selangor), Java, Sumatra, Lesser Sunda Isl. (Sumbawa, Lombok), Sulawesi, Moluccas and Borneo.

== Habitat ==
This species is typical of the mountain forests and prefers shaded areas and moist soils, at elevations between 300 metres (980 ft) and 750 metres (2,460 ft) above sea level.

== Gallery ==
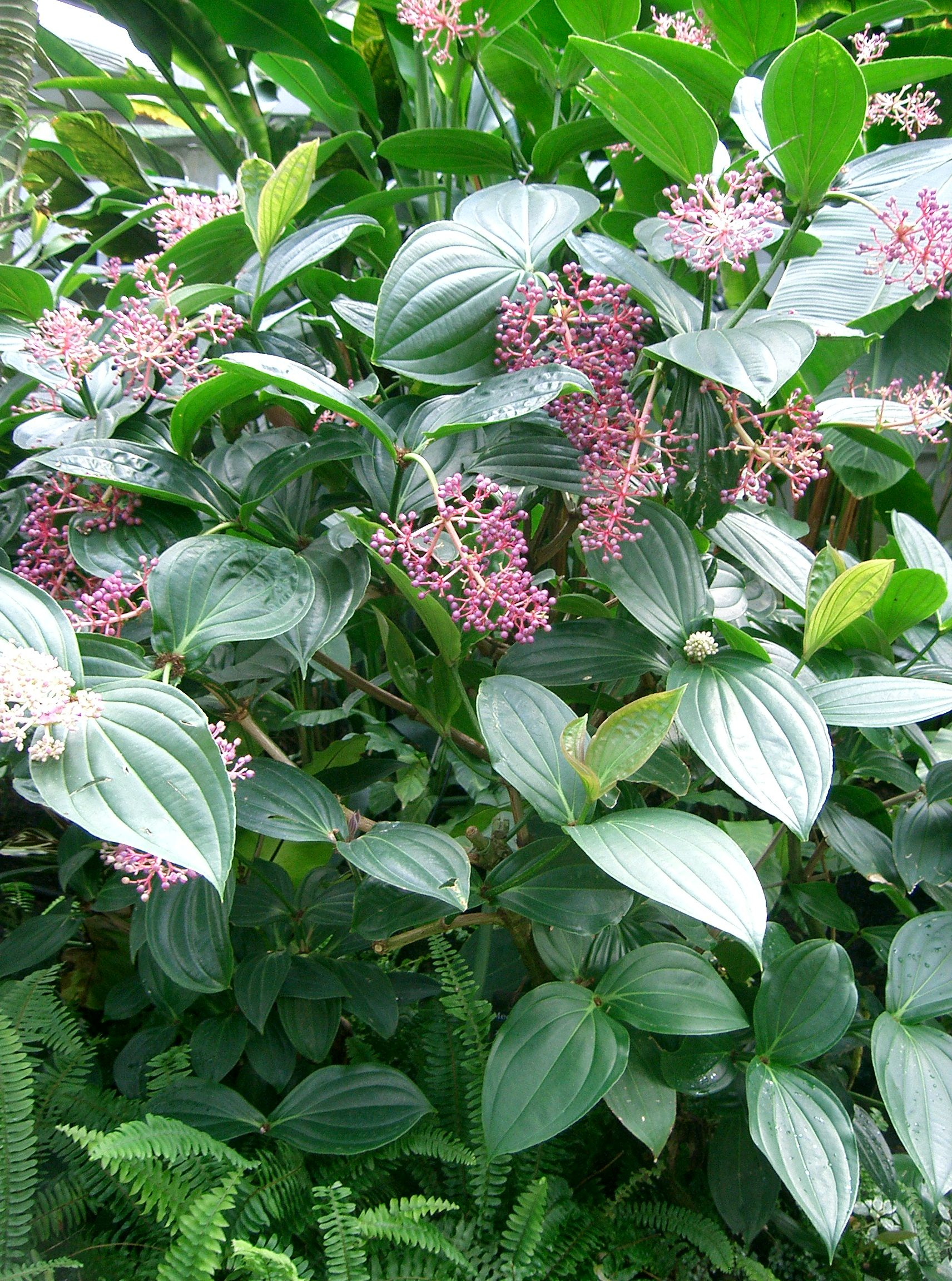
Plant of Medinilla speciosa

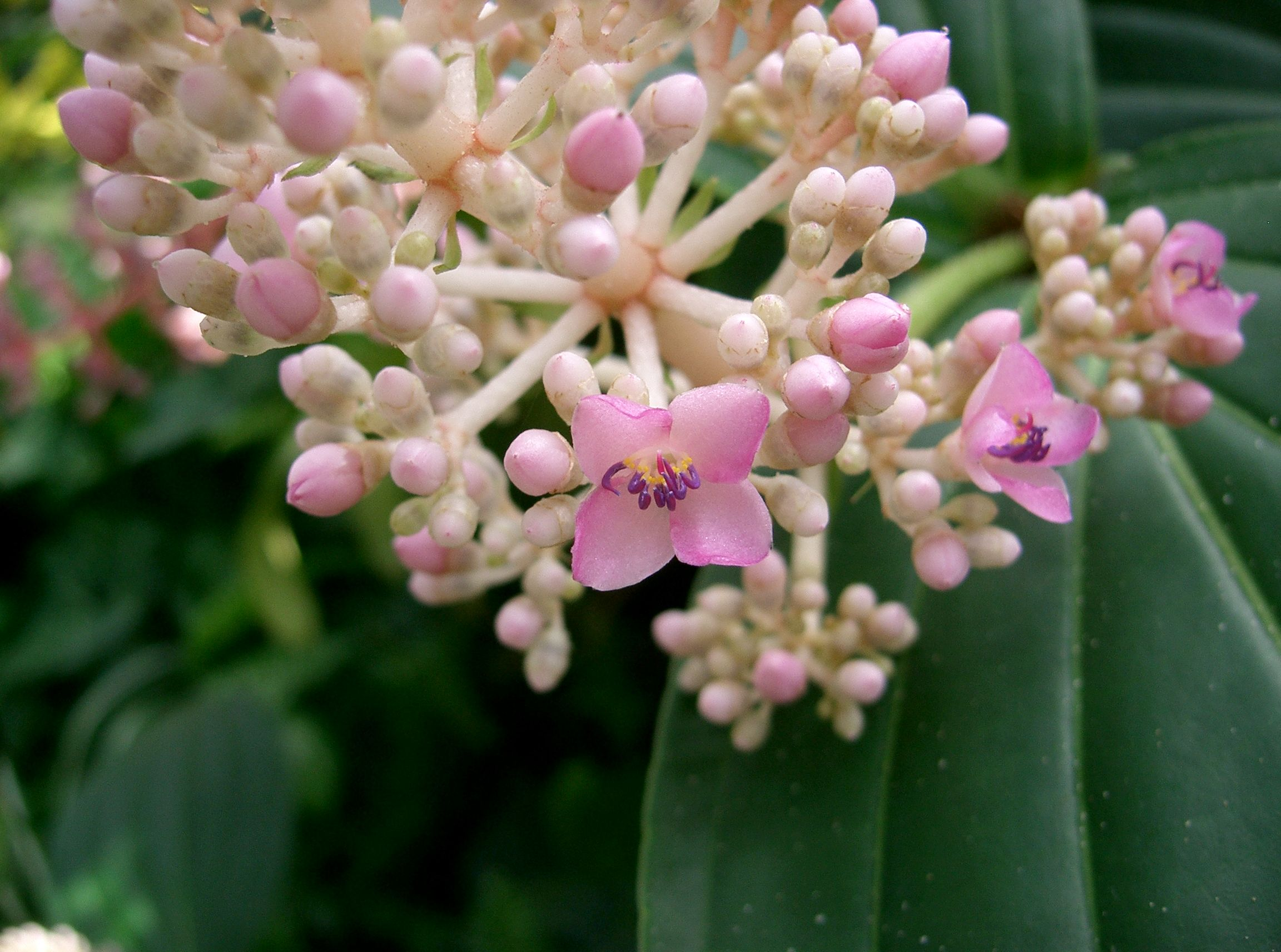
Flowers of Medinilla speciosa

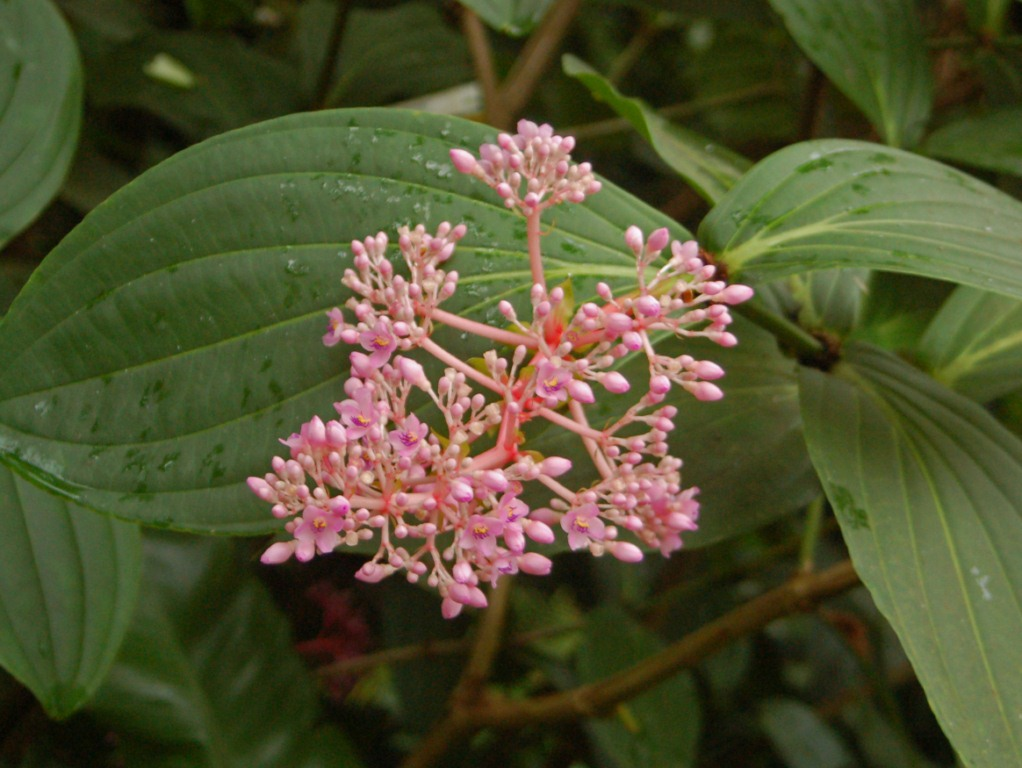
Blossoms and leaves of Medinilla speciosa

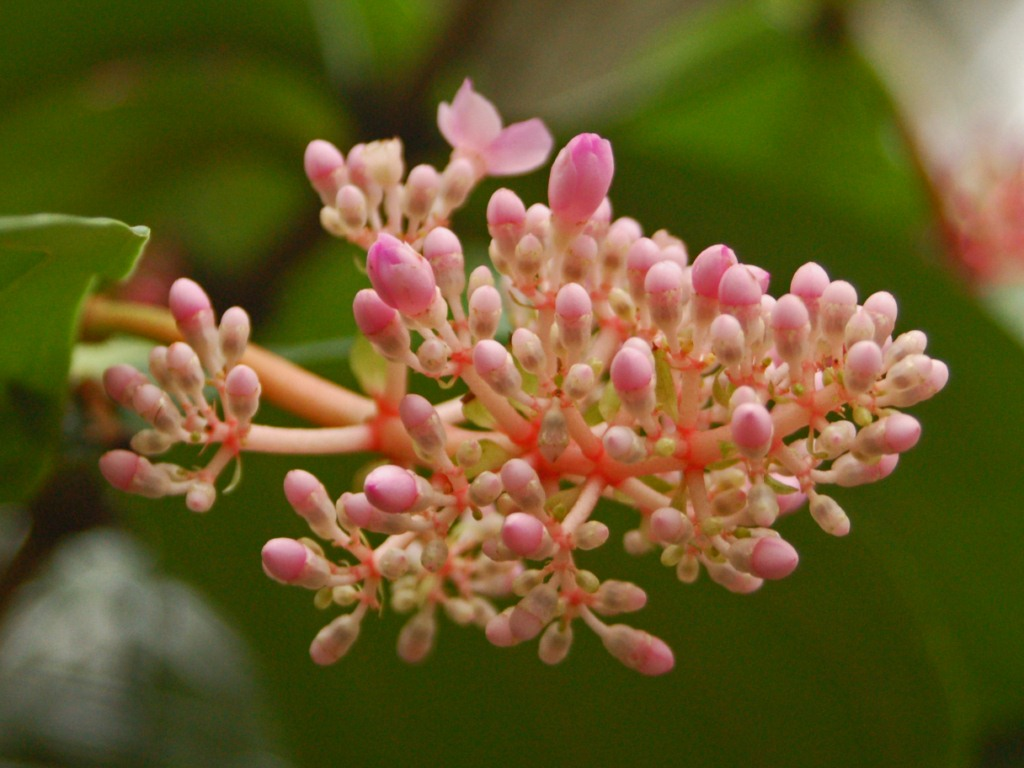
Blossoms of Medinilla speciosa
