= Quercus oxyodon =

Conservation status
- Least Concern (IUCN 3.1)

Scientific classification
- Kingdom: Plantae
- Clade: Embryophytes
- Clade: Tracheophytes
- Clade: Spermatophytes
- Clade: Angiosperms
- Clade: Eudicots
- Clade: Rosids
- Order: Fagales
- Family: Fagaceae
- Genus: Quercus
- Subgenus: Quercus subg. Cerris
- Section: Quercus sect. Cyclobalanopsis
- Species: Q. oxyodon

Binomial name
- Quercus oxyodon Miq. (1864)

Synonyms
- List: Cyclobalanopsis fargesii (Franch.) W.H.Zhang; Cyclobalanopsis lineata var. fargesii (Franch.) Schottky; Cyclobalanopsis lineata var. grandifolia (Skan) Schottky; Cyclobalanopsis lineata var. oxyodon (Miq.) Schottky; Cyclobalanopsis oxyodon (Miq.) Oerst.; Quercus fargesii Franch.; Quercus glauca var. lineata Franch.; Quercus glauca var. nakaoi Kitam. & T.Horik.; Quercus lineata var. fargesii (Franch.) Skan; Quercus lineata var. grandifolia Skan; Quercus lineata var. macrophylla Seemen; Quercus lineata var. oxyodon (Miq.) Wenz.; Quercus oxyodon var. fargesii (Franch.) Rehder & E.H.Wilson; Quercus silicina var. orgyalis Hand.-Mazz.; Quercus songtavanensis A.Camus

Species of oak tree

Quercus oxyodon is a tree species in the beech family Fagaceae. It is native to the Himalayas (Nepal, Sikkim, Bhutan, Assam, Tibet, Myanmar) and to the mountains of southern China (Guangdong, Guangxi, Guizhou, Hubei, Hunan, Jiangxi, Shaanxi, Sichuan, Yunnan, Zhejiang) and the Sa Pa region of northern Vietnam (as Q. songtavanensis). It is placed in the subgenus Cerris, section Cyclobalanopsis.

Quercus oxyodon is a tree up to 20 m tall. Leaves can be as much as 220 mm long.
