= Auguste Taton =

Belgian botanist (1914-1989)

Auguste Simon Taton (25 January 1914–27 October 1989) was a Belgian botanist who worked primarily in the Belgian Congo in Africa (now known as the Democratic Republic of the Congo).

== Biography ==
He was born in Jemeppe-sur-Meuse, now a part of Seraing, Belgium. Taton graduated from the Institut Agronomique de Gembloux in 1937 with a degree in agronomy and served in the military from 25 August 1937 to 25 February 1939. From 1941 to 1945 he served as an associate with the Institut des Parcs nationaux du Congo belge (Institute of National Parks of the Belgian Congo), identifying herbarium specimens collected in Albert National Park, now known as Virunga National Park. In November 1945 he became the assistant to the Division of Botany at the INEAC (Institut National pour l’Étude Agronomique au Congo Belge). In 1952, he continued his studies in the United States at the University of Wisconsin–Madison and the University of Massachusetts Amherst, taking courses in agrostology (study of grasses).

From September 1956 to February 1961, Taton was the head of the INEAC station in Kivu. During his time in the Democratic Republic of the Congo, he collected 1624 herbarium specimens, which he deposited at the botanical garden in Brussels (Jardin botanique de l’Etat à Bruxelles) and Yangambi. Beginning in July 1961 Taton worked on the flora of the Democratic Republic of the Congo, Rwanda, and Burundi at the Belgian Institute for the encouragement of scientific research overseas (Institut belge pour l’encouragement de la recherche scientifique d’outre-mer) and then at the Belgian Ministry of Education and Culture.

From April 1963 to June 1966 Taton was used by the Food and Agriculture Organization as a representative in Kivu and Kinshasa and then later placed on an agrostology mission in Morocco. While in Morocco, he collected nearly 450 herbarium specimens, of which only 51 reached the National Botanic Garden of Belgium, the rest being lost in transit. He then continued to work on his treatment of the flora of the Democratic Republic of the Congo, Rwanda, and Burundi, which eventually became his 1972 Flora of Central Africa (Flore d’Afrique centrale). In July 1971, he was promoted to chief of the Dialypétales-Sympétales section at the Spermatophytes-Ptéidophytes Department, focusing on the herbarium collections of tropical Africa.

Taton retired on 1 February 1979, though he continued to collaborate on studies on the flora of Central Africa until his death on 27 October 1989 in his home in Wezembeek-Oppem.

== Personal ==
Taton was married in 1944 and had three children. At the time of his death, he had nine grandchildren.

== Awards ==
- 1955: Gold Medal, Royal Order of the Lion
- 1982: Prix E. Laurent award of the Royal Academy of Belgium (l’Académie royale de Belgique)
