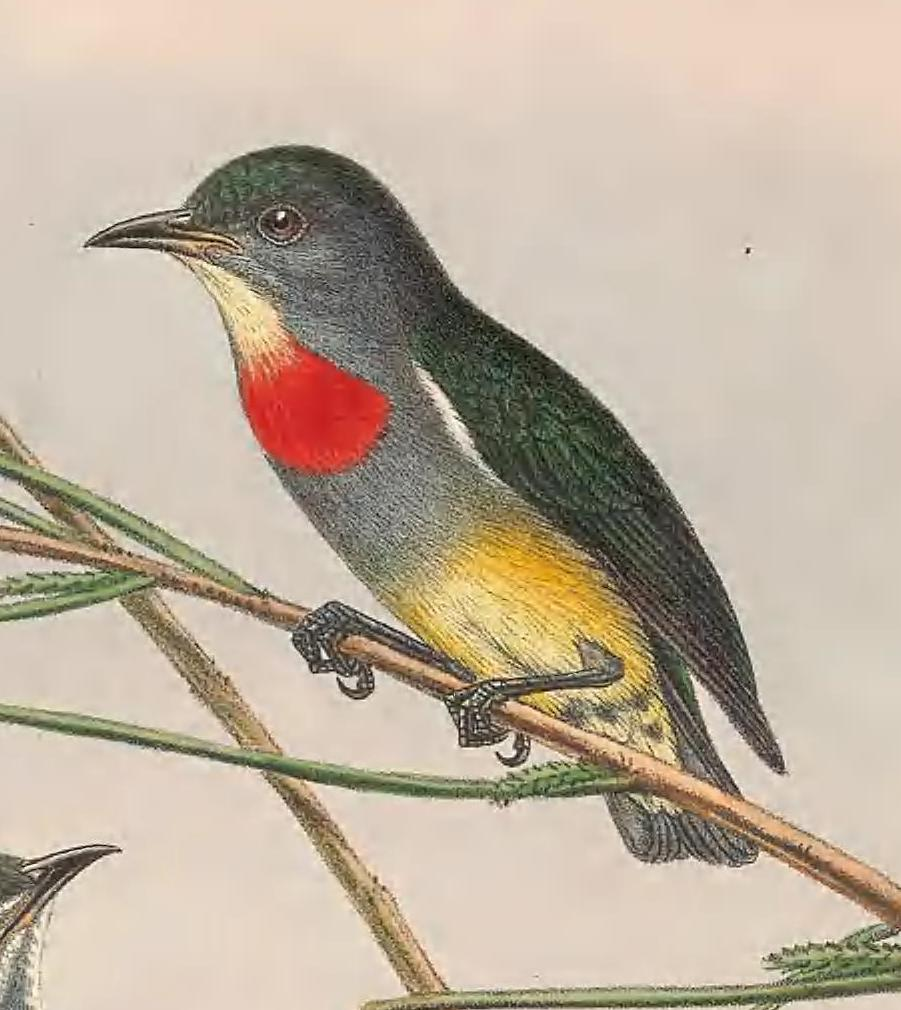
- Illustration by William Matthew Hart
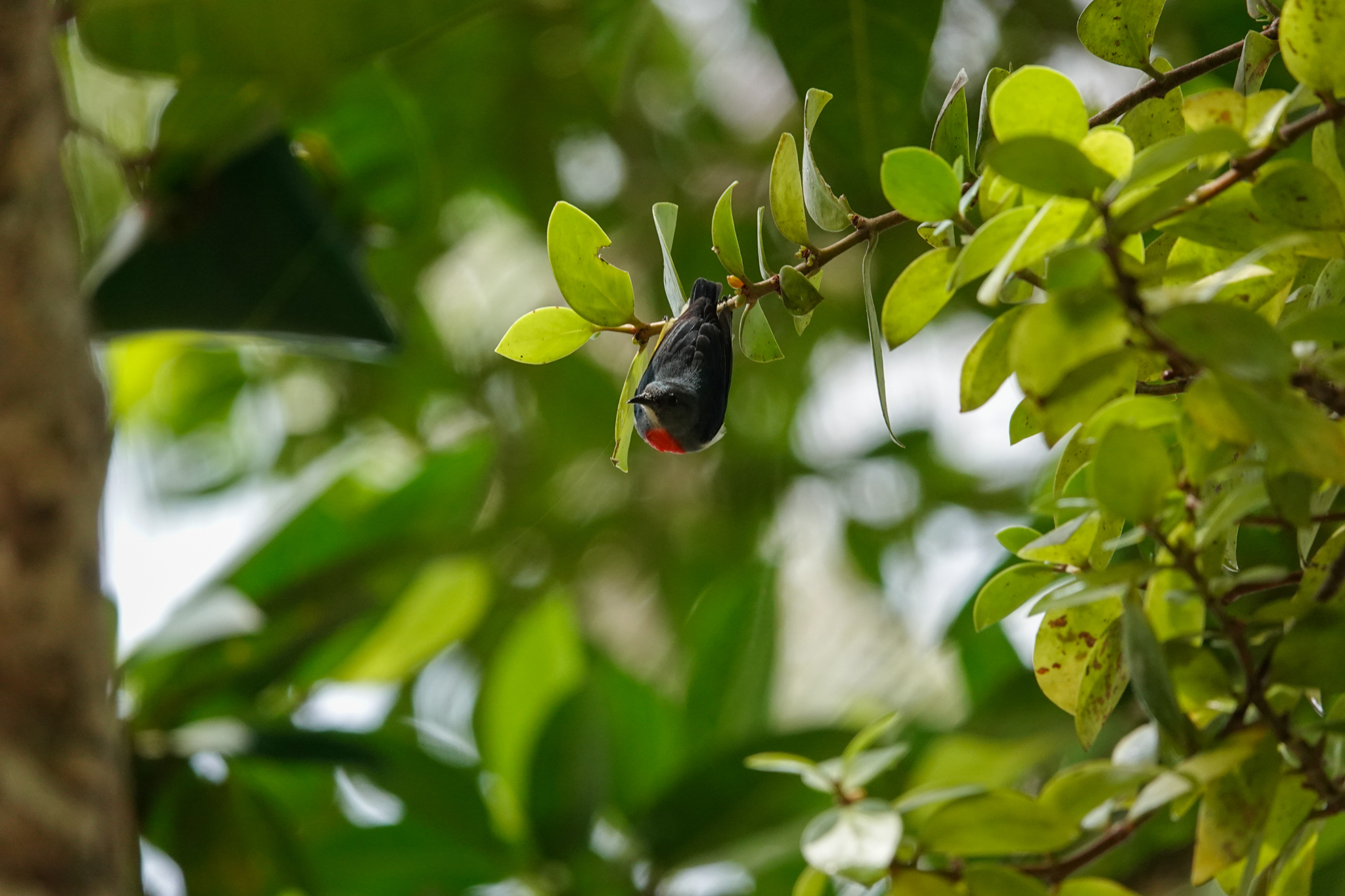

Conservation status
- Least Concern (IUCN 3.1)

Scientific classification
- Kingdom: Animalia
- Phylum: Chordata
- Class: Aves
- Order: Passeriformes
- Family: Dicaeidae
- Genus: Dicaeum
- Species: D. aeneum

Binomial name
- Dicaeum aeneum Pucheran, 1853

= Midget flowerpecker =

Species of bird

The midget flowerpecker (Dicaeum aeneum) is a species of bird in the family Dicaeidae. It is found in the Solomon Islands archipelago. Its natural habitats are subtropical or tropical moist lowland forest, subtropical or tropical mangrove forest, and subtropical or tropical moist montane forest.

The females have dark wings with a white and yellow stomach. The males have the same features but have a red upper chest. Their call is a short and high-pitched tik-tik-tik. This species does not migrate and has inhabited the Solomon Islands since 1900. The number of midget flowerpeckers is unknown, but they are a stable species.

== Field identification ==
The midget flowerpeckers is a male-nominated race, meaning it has several subspecies and the nominated species is the one used to describe the species as a whole. The male flowerpecker is 8 cm and around 7.1 to 8.8 grams. The head, sides of the throat, breasts, and upper abdomen are all light grey. The crown of its head and upper parts are dark grey with hues of blue. Its upper throat, lower abdomen, and undertail are white. On the center breast is a bright red patch of red, contrasting with the rest of its body, The flank of the bird is a shade of yellow. Female midget flowerpeckers do not have the vibrant red patch on their chest and instead have green flanks. Juvenile midget flowerpeckers do not have the blue hue and female juveniles have a more grey-toned throat.

== History ==
The midget flowerpecker is a part of the Dicaeidae bird family. It is a subspecies is the Dicaeum. They live in the Solomon Islands year-round, located in the western South Pacific Ocean. The first sighting of the bird was in 1900, and they have been cited continually to this day. There are currently 312 recorded observations of the midget flowerpecker. Most sightings of the midget flowerpeckers are observed in pairs or small groups. There is no global threat to these birds and they are sighted frequently in the Solomon Islands.

== Habitat and diet ==
The midget flowerpecker's habitat is in the forest of the Solomon Islands. They prefer high mountains and forests, but can also be found in the lower parts of the forest. Their diet consists of insects and fruits. Common insects in the Solomon Islands include the painted grasshawk, pacific giant centipede, and the fiery skimmer. Common fruits include carambola, pawpaw, and the golden apple. They hover while feeding and forage in groups.

== Sounds ==
The midget flowerpecker makes a short, high-pitched, 'tik-tik-tik-tik' and a very high-pitched 'sweet sweet'. Their calls are in a trisyllabic pattern, which then develops into a twitter. Their chirps can resemble the sound of a snapping twig.

== Conservation status ==
The conservation status of this bird is that it is not threatened globally. Since this bird is restricted to a certain region, there is no global threat. They are also very common in their region.
