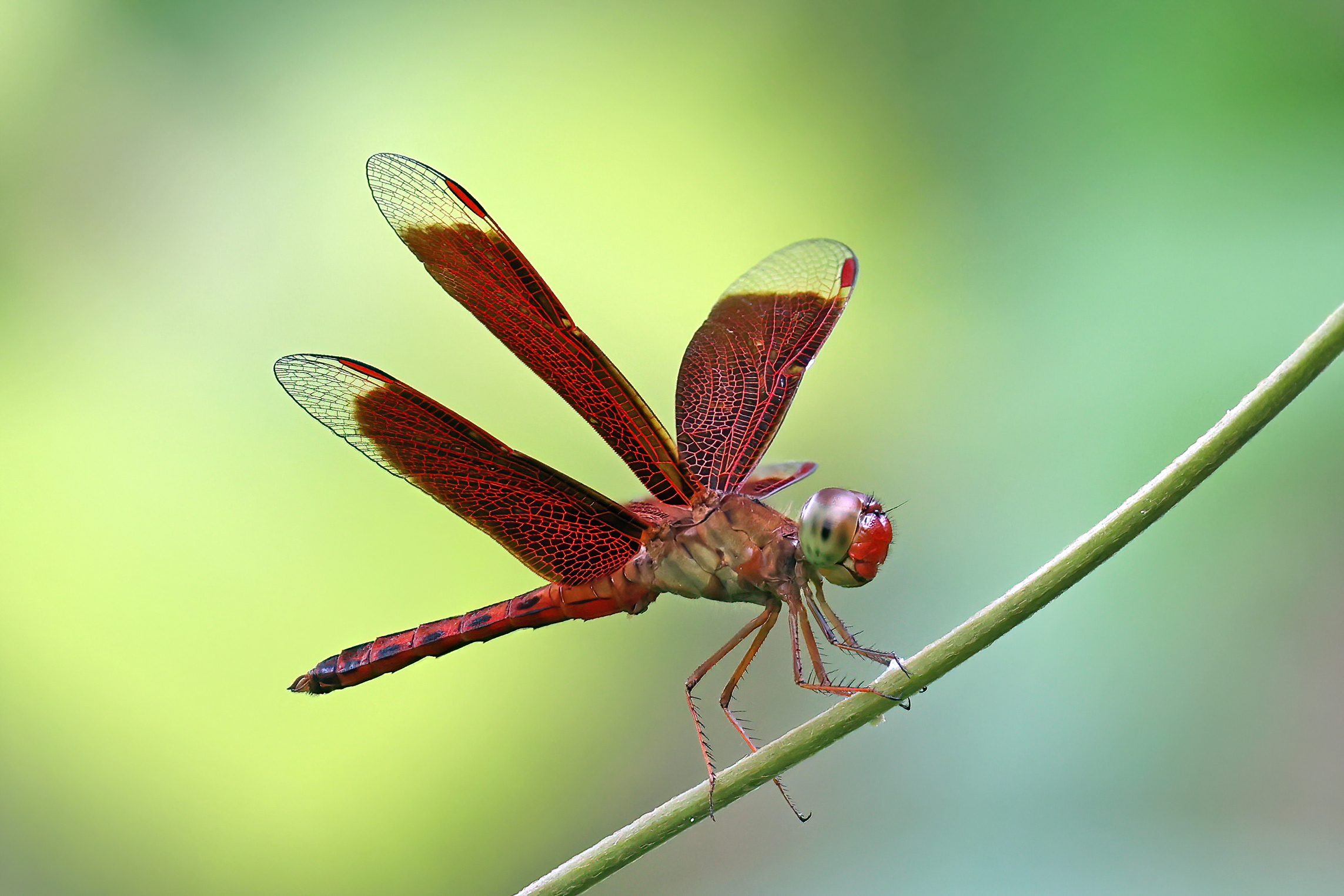
- Male
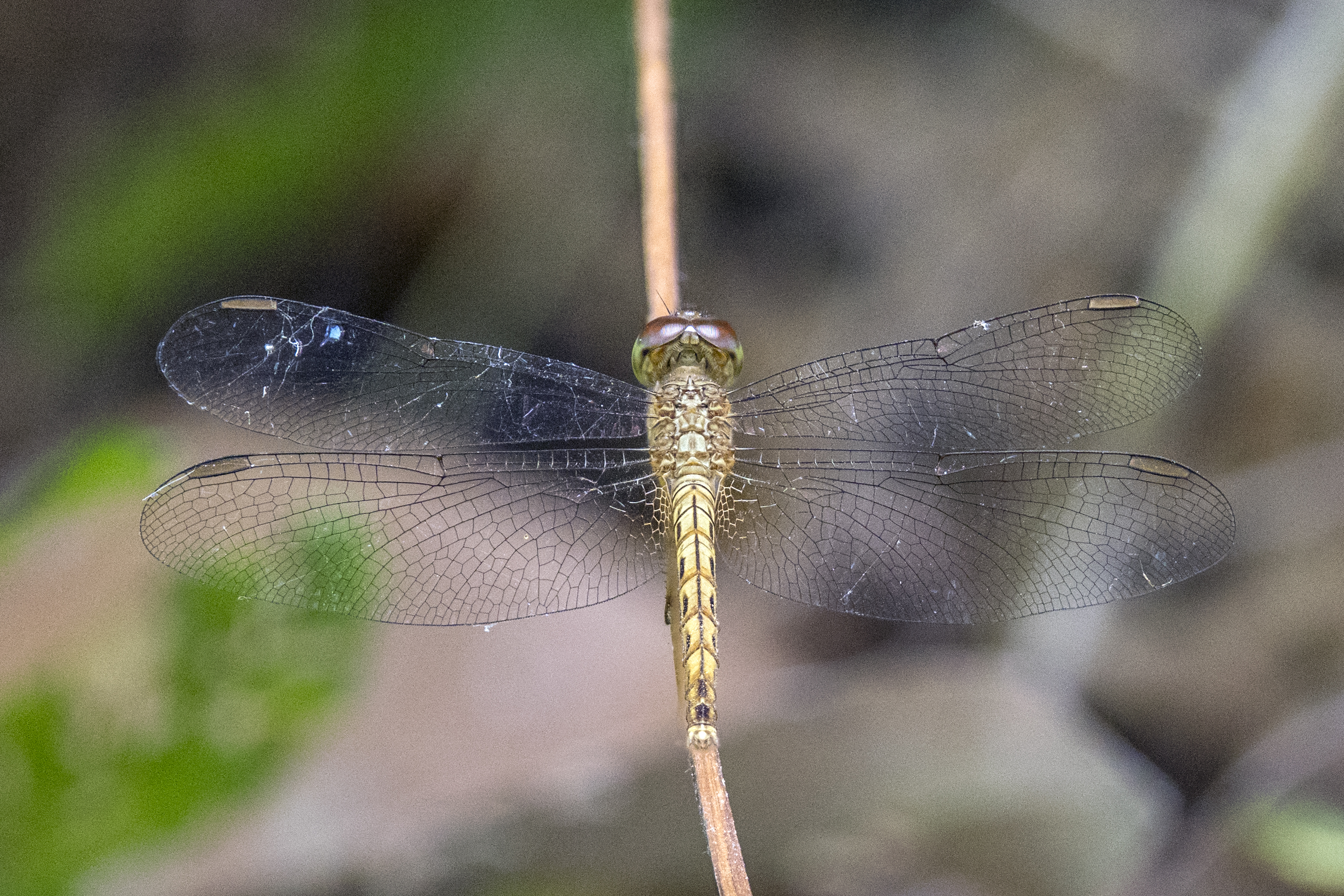
- Female

Conservation status
- Least Concern (IUCN 3.1)

Scientific classification
- Kingdom: Animalia
- Phylum: Arthropoda
- Clade: Pancrustacea
- Class: Insecta
- Order: Odonata
- Infraorder: Anisoptera
- Family: Libellulidae
- Genus: Neurothemis
- Species: N. fluctuans

Binomial name
- Neurothemis fluctuans (Fabricius, 1793)

= Neurothemis fluctuans =

Species of dragonfly

Neurothemis fluctuans, the red grasshawk, common parasol or grasshawk dragonfly, is a species of dragonfly in the family Libellulidae. It is widespread in many Asian countries.

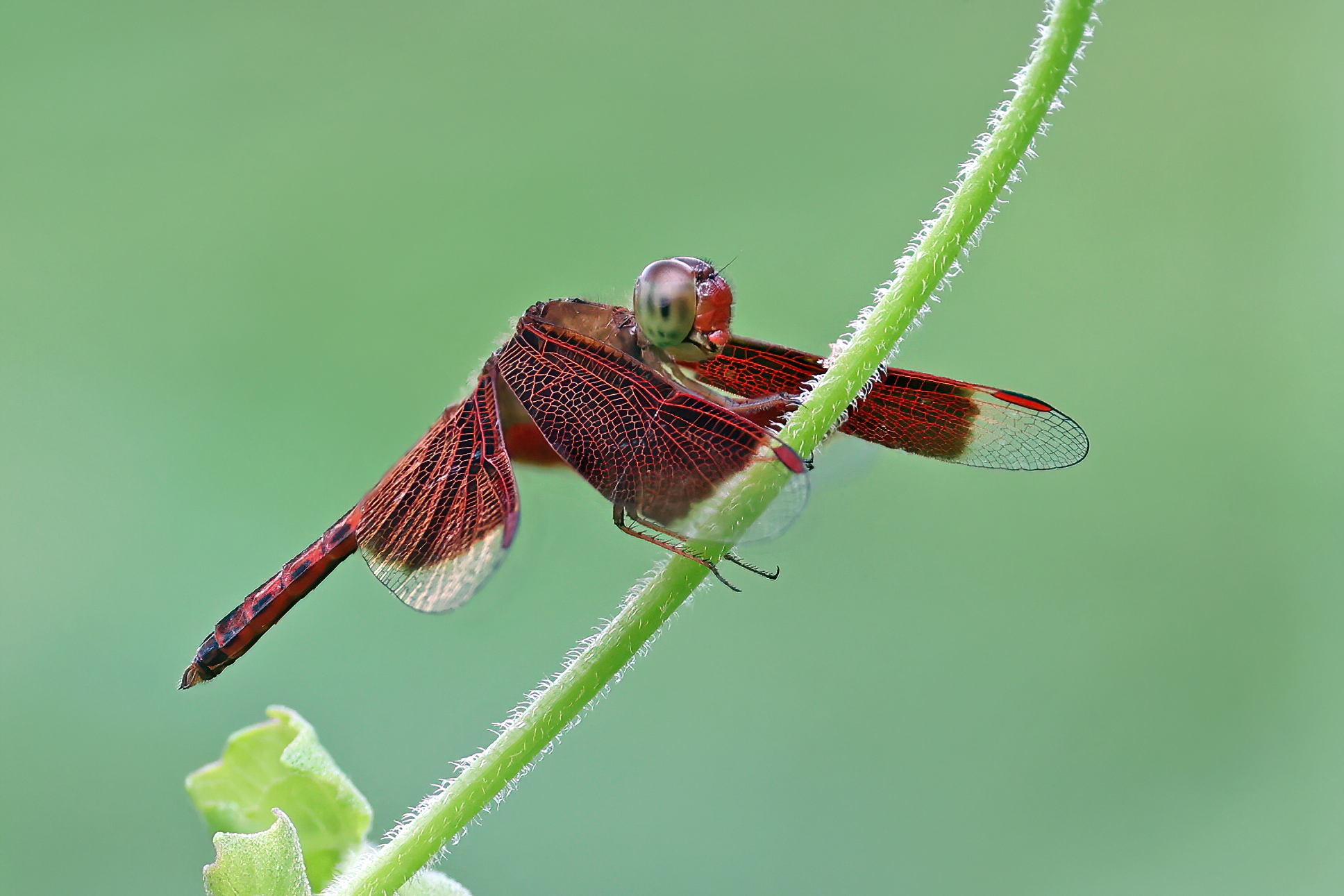
male
Phuket, Thailand

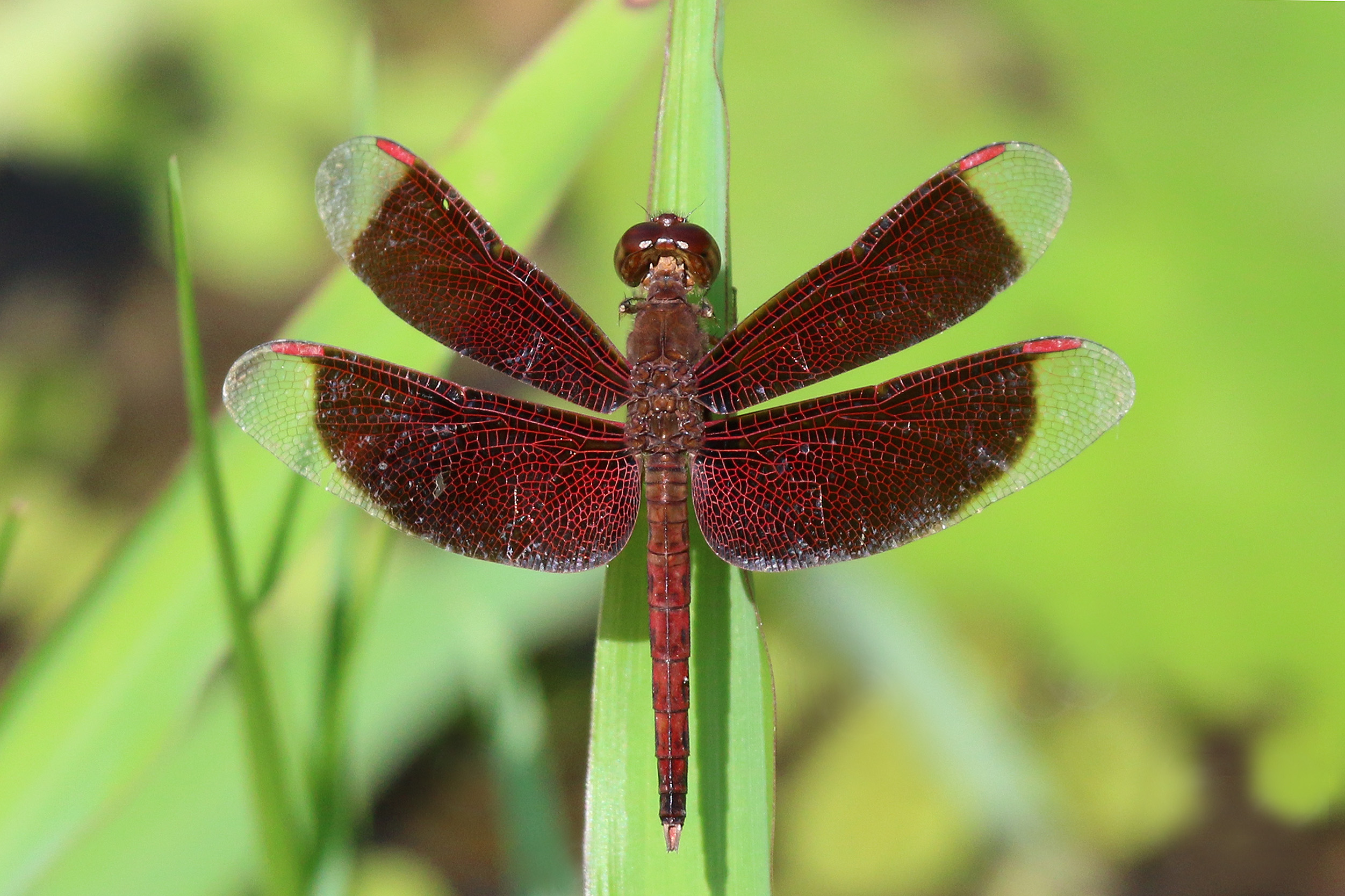
male
Singapore

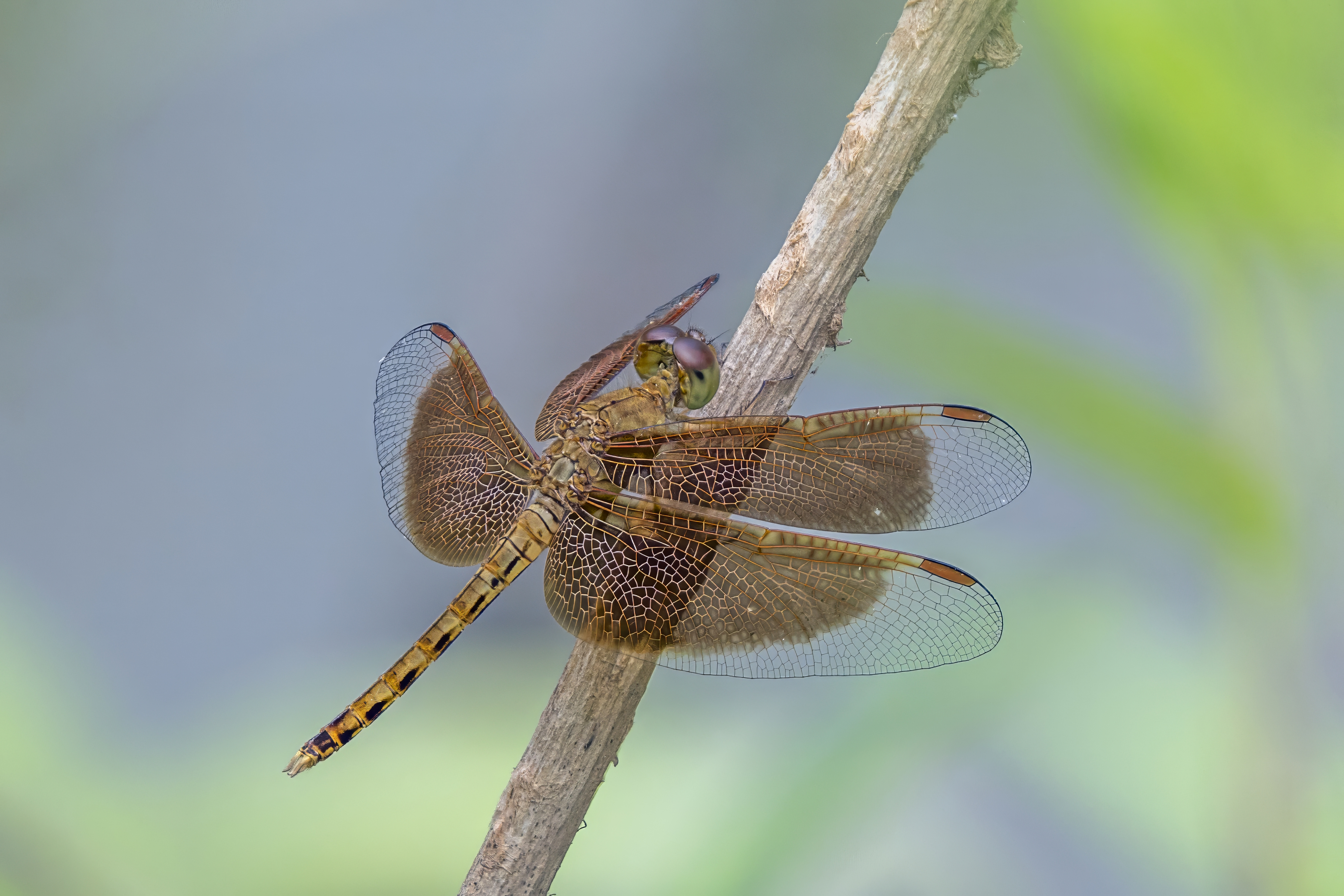
immature male
Vietnam

== Sources ==
- fluctuans.html World Dragonflies
