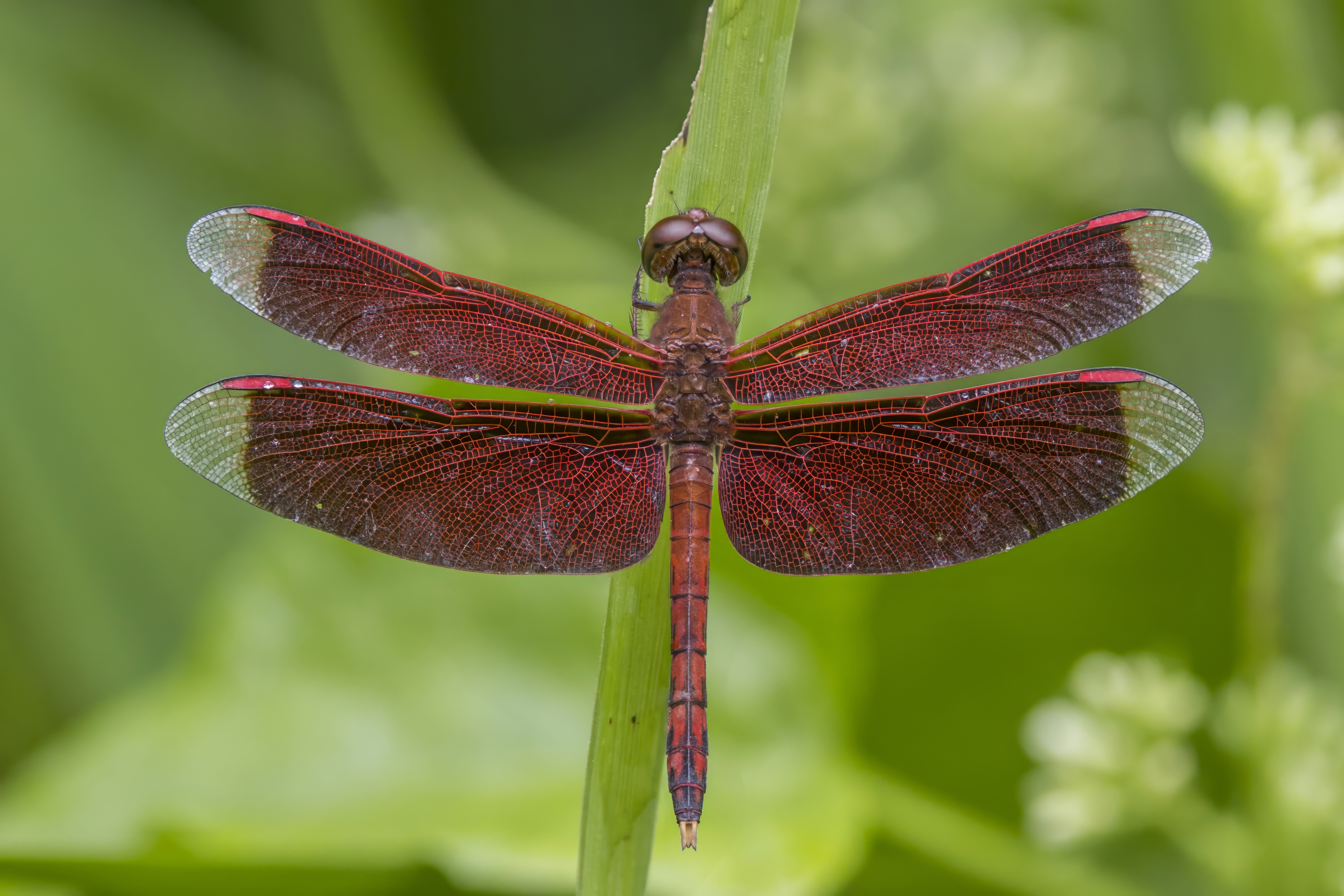
- male, Palau
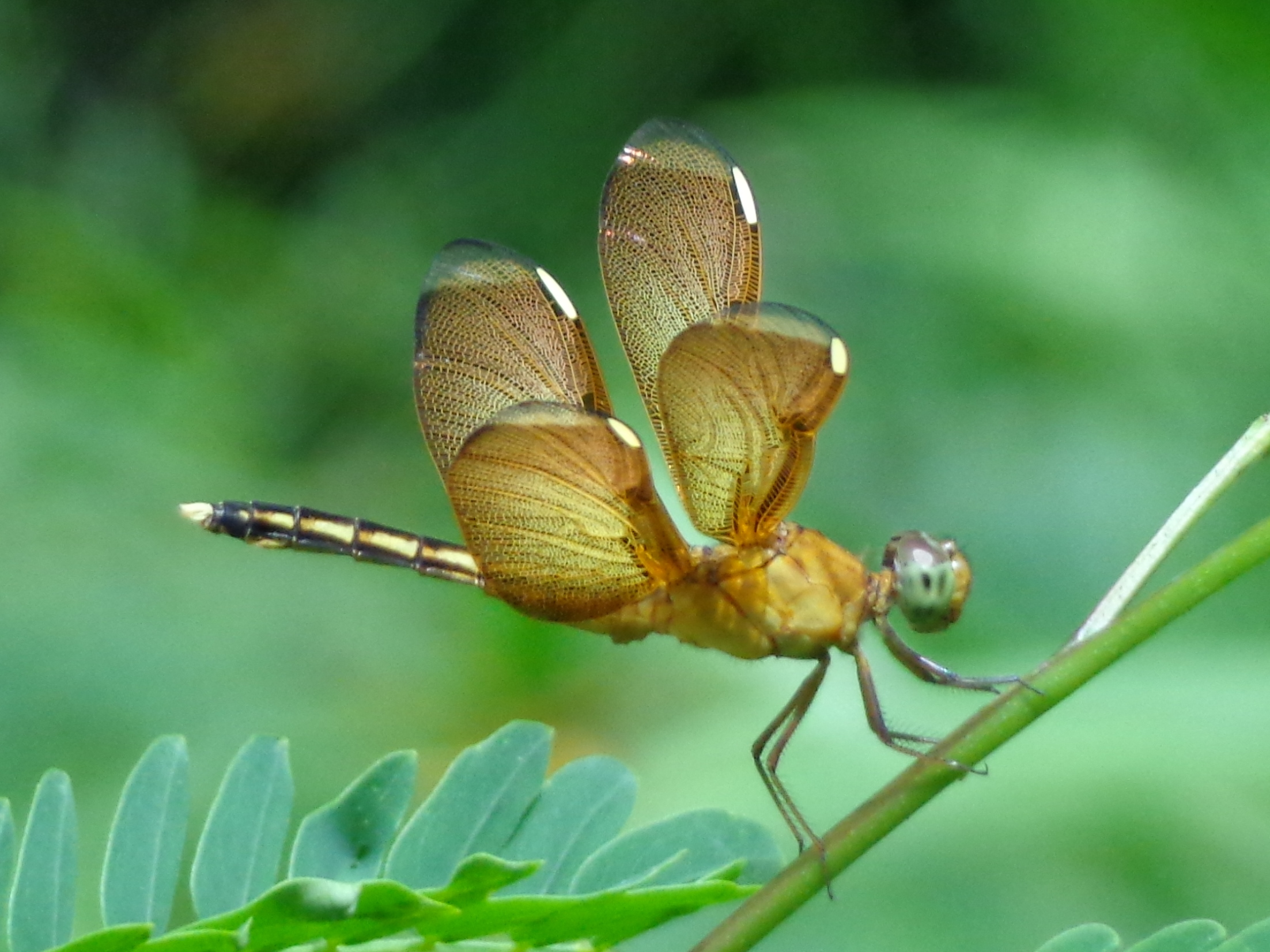
- female, Kampus Unsrat Manado, Indonesia

Conservation status
- Least Concern (IUCN 3.1)

Scientific classification
- Kingdom: Animalia
- Phylum: Arthropoda
- Clade: Pancrustacea
- Class: Insecta
- Order: Odonata
- Infraorder: Anisoptera
- Family: Libellulidae
- Genus: Neurothemis
- Species: N. terminata

Binomial name
- Neurothemis terminata (Ris, 1911)

= Neurothemis terminata =

Species of dragonfly

The Straight-edge red parasol, or red-winged dragonfly, (Neurothemis terminata) is a species of dragonfly in family Libellulidae. Neurothemis terminata is a widespread and often common species which can occur in man-made habitats, from Peninsular Malaysia, the Philippines and Japan to the Lesser Sundas in Indonesia.

Male N. terminata have red colour on its body and wings, while the female have yellowish colour. The adult has 8-11 cm body length.

Entomologists recorded an eight-legged dragonfly, Red-winged dragonfly (Neurothemis terminata) for the first time in the Pilibhit tiger reserve area in Uttar Pradesh, India.
