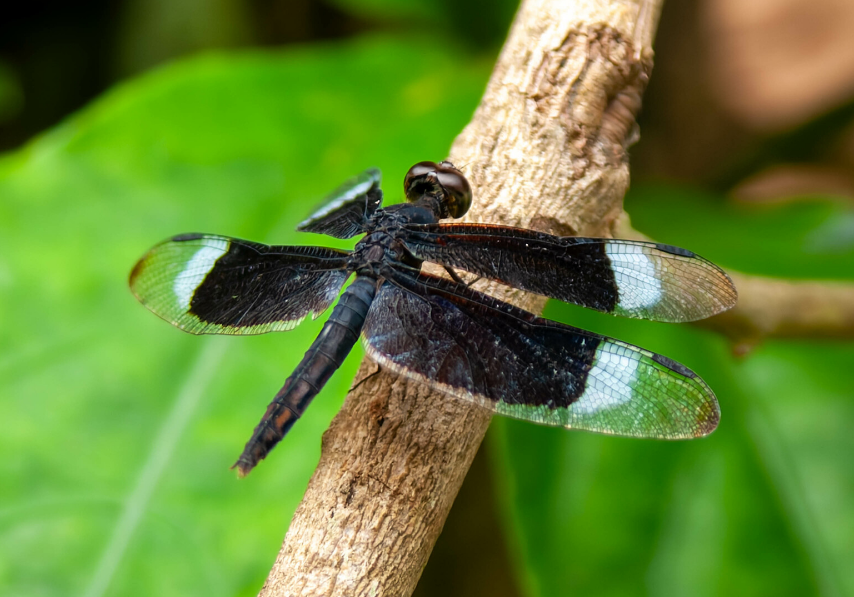
- Neurothemis decora from New Guinea

Conservation status
- Least Concern (IUCN 3.1)

Scientific classification
- Kingdom: Animalia
- Phylum: Arthropoda
- Class: Insecta
- Order: Odonata
- Infraorder: Anisoptera
- Family: Libellulidae
- Genus: Neurothemis
- Species: N. decora

Binomial name
- Neurothemis decora (Kaup in Brauer, 1866)

= Neurothemis decora =

Species of dragonfly

Neurothemis decora is a species of dragonfly in the family Libellulidae.

== Distribution ==
This species is present in New Guinea.
