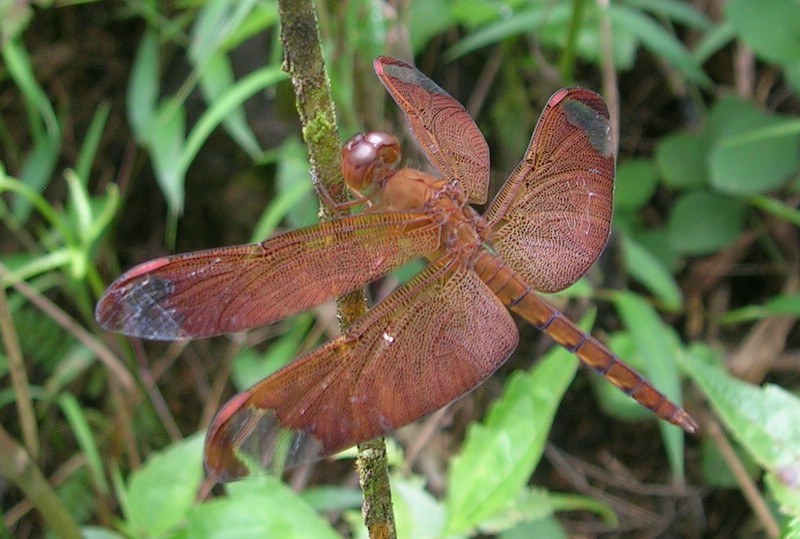
- Fulvous Forest Skimmer
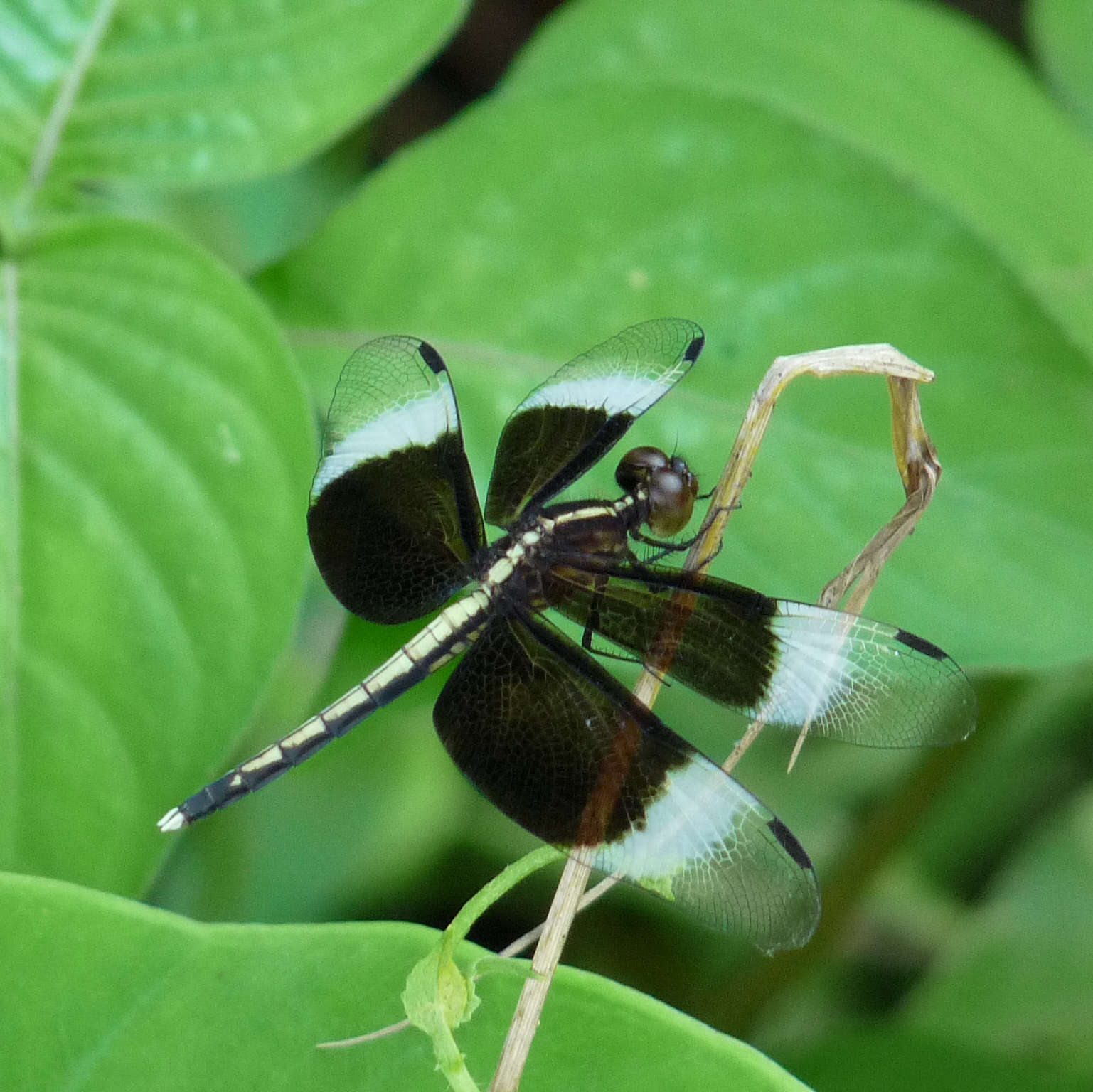
- Pied Paddy Skimmer

Scientific classification
- Kingdom: Animalia
- Phylum: Arthropoda
- Clade: Pancrustacea
- Class: Insecta
- Order: Odonata
- Infraorder: Anisoptera
- Family: Libellulidae
- Subfamily: Sympetrinae
- Genus: Neurothemis; Brauer, 1867

Synonyms
- Polyneura Rambur, 1842

= Neurothemis =

Genus of dragonflies

Neurothemis is a genus of dragonflies in the family Libellulidae. They are found in India, Asia, Australia and the Pacific region. Most Neurothemis species are red in color.

== Etymology ==
The genus name Neurothemis combines the Greek νεῦρον (neuron, "nerve" or "vein") and -themis, from Greek Θέμις (Themis), the goddess of divine law, order and justice. In early odonate taxonomy, names ending in -themis were introduced by Hagen and were widely used for dragonflies.

== Species ==
The genus Neurothemis includes the following species:

Male	Female	Scientific name	Common name	Distribution
		Neurothemis decora (Kaup in Brauer, 1866)		Indonesia (Papua) and Papua New Guinea
		Neurothemis degener Selys, 1879		East India and Myanmar
		Neurothemis disparilis Kirby, 1889		Malay Peninsula and Borneo
		Neurothemis feralis (Burmeister, 1839)		Indonesia (Sumatra and Java)
		Neurothemis fluctuans (Fabricius, 1793)	Red Grasshawk, Common Parasol	Cambodia, India (Eastern India; Andaman and Nicobar), Indonesia (Sumatra, Kalimantan, Java), Laos, Myanmar, Malaysia, Philippines (Palawan), Singapore, Thailand, and Vietnam
		Neurothemis fulvia (Drury, 1773)	fulvous forest skimmer	Bangladesh, Bhutan, Cambodia, China, India, Indonesia (Sumatra), Laos, Malaysia, Myanmar, Taiwan, Thailand, and Vietnam.
		Neurothemis intermedia (Rambur, 1842)	paddyfield parasol	Cambodia, India, Indonesia (Java, Kangean Islands and Sumba), Laos, Myanmar, Sri Lanka, Thailand, and Vietnam
		Neurothemis luctuosa Lieftinck, 1942		Indonesia (Papua)
		Neurothemis manadensis (Boisduval, 1835)		Indonesia (Sulawesi, and Maluku)
		Neurothemis nesaea Ris, 1911		Sulawesi, Celebes
		Neurothemis oligoneura Brauer, 1867	spotted grasshawk	Australia and New Guinea
		Neurothemis papuensis Lieftinck, 1942		New Guinea
		Neurothemis ramburii (Kaup in Brauer, 1866)		Peninsular Malaysia, Taiwan, the Andaman Islands, Sumatra, Java, Borneo (Sarawak, Sabah, Brunei and Kalimantan), the lesser Sunda islands, and The Philippines.
		Neurothemis stigmatizans (Fabricius, 1775)	painted grasshawk	Australia ( southern Queensland border to Broome, Western Australia. ) and New Guinea to the Solomon Islands
		Neurothemis taiwanensis Seehausen & Dow, 2016		Taiwan
		Neurothemis terminata Ris, 1911		Indonesia (Sumatra, Java, Lesser Sunda, and Borneo), The Philippines, and Palau.
		Neurothemis tullia (Drury, 1773)	pied paddy skimmer	Bangladesh, China, Hong Kong, India, Malaysia (Peninsular Malaysia), Myanmar, Nepal, Sri Lanka, Taiwan, Thailand, Cambodia and Vietnam
