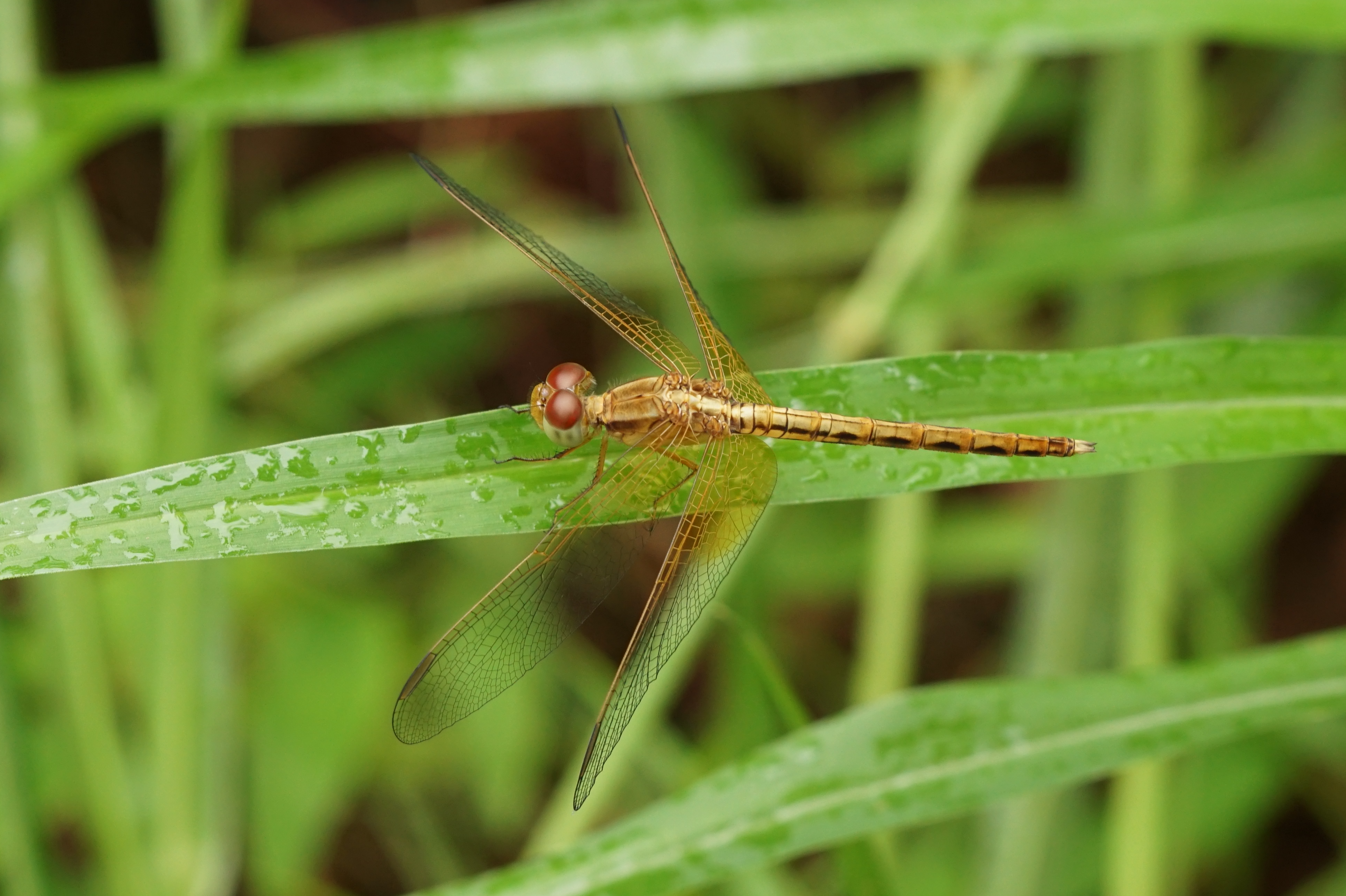
- Male
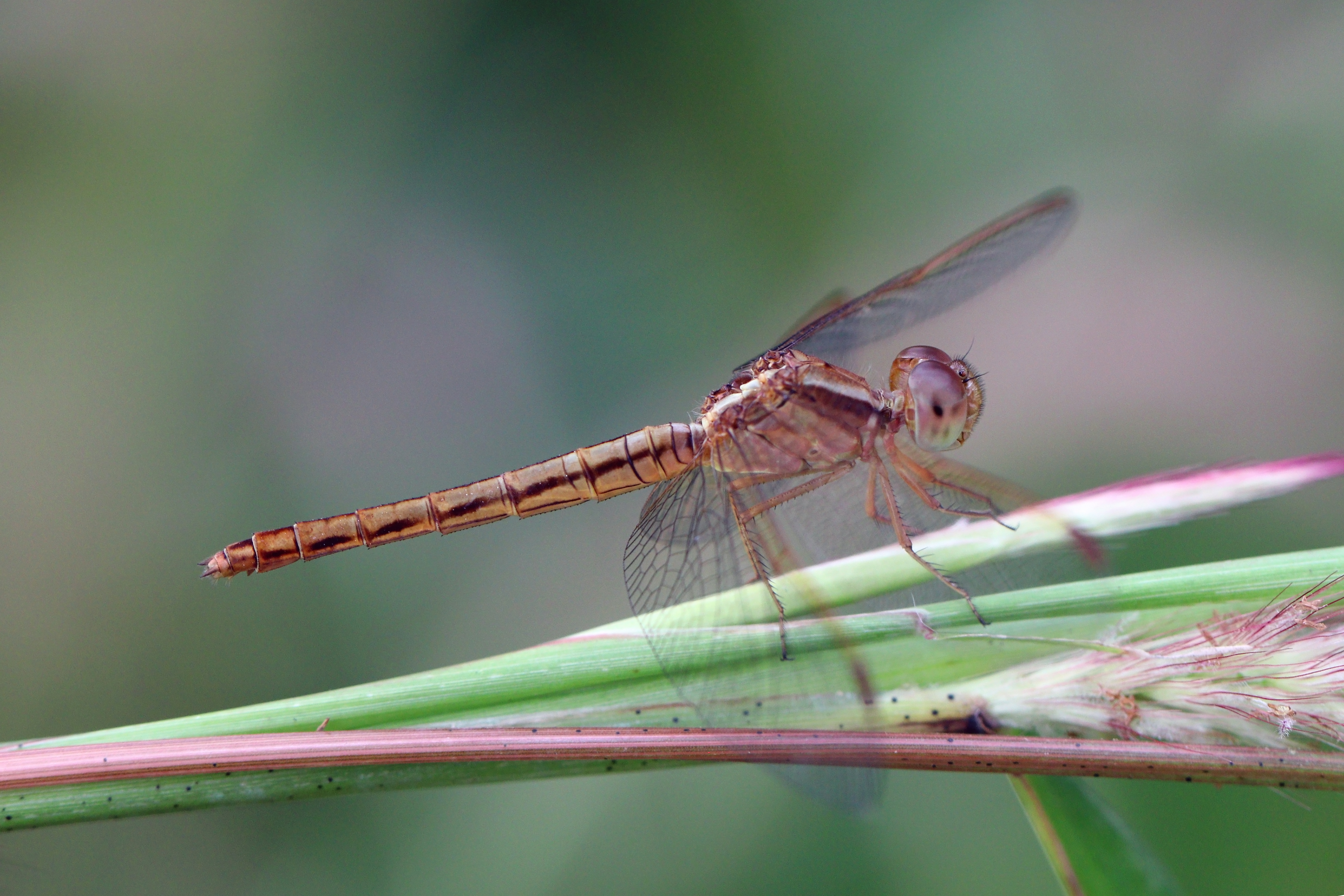
- Female

Conservation status
- Least Concern (IUCN 3.1)

Scientific classification
- Kingdom: Animalia
- Phylum: Arthropoda
- Class: Insecta
- Order: Odonata
- Infraorder: Anisoptera
- Family: Libellulidae
- Genus: Neurothemis
- Species: N. intermedia

Binomial name
- Neurothemis intermedia (Rambur, 1842)

= Neurothemis intermedia =

Species of dragonfly

Neurothemis intermedia, the paddyfield parasol, is a species of dragonfly in the family Libellulidae. It is widespread in many Asian countries. Four subspecies are recognized.

== Subspecies ==
- Neurothemis intermedia atalanta Ris 1919
- Neurothemis intermedia degener Selys, 1879
- Neurothemis intermedia excelsa Lieftinck, 1934
- Neurothemis intermedia intermedia (Rambur, 1842)

== Description and habitat ==
It is a yellowish red dragonfly with reddish brown eyes. It has a broad basal amber-yellow marking at base of all wings. Its abdomen is reddish with a ventro-lateral brownish stripe interrupted at apical end of segments 3 to 8. Young males and females are more yellowish red. It is more common at sea level all along the coast but becoming rare in the hills.

== See also ==
- List of odonates of Sri Lanka
- List of odonates of India
- List of odonata of Kerala
