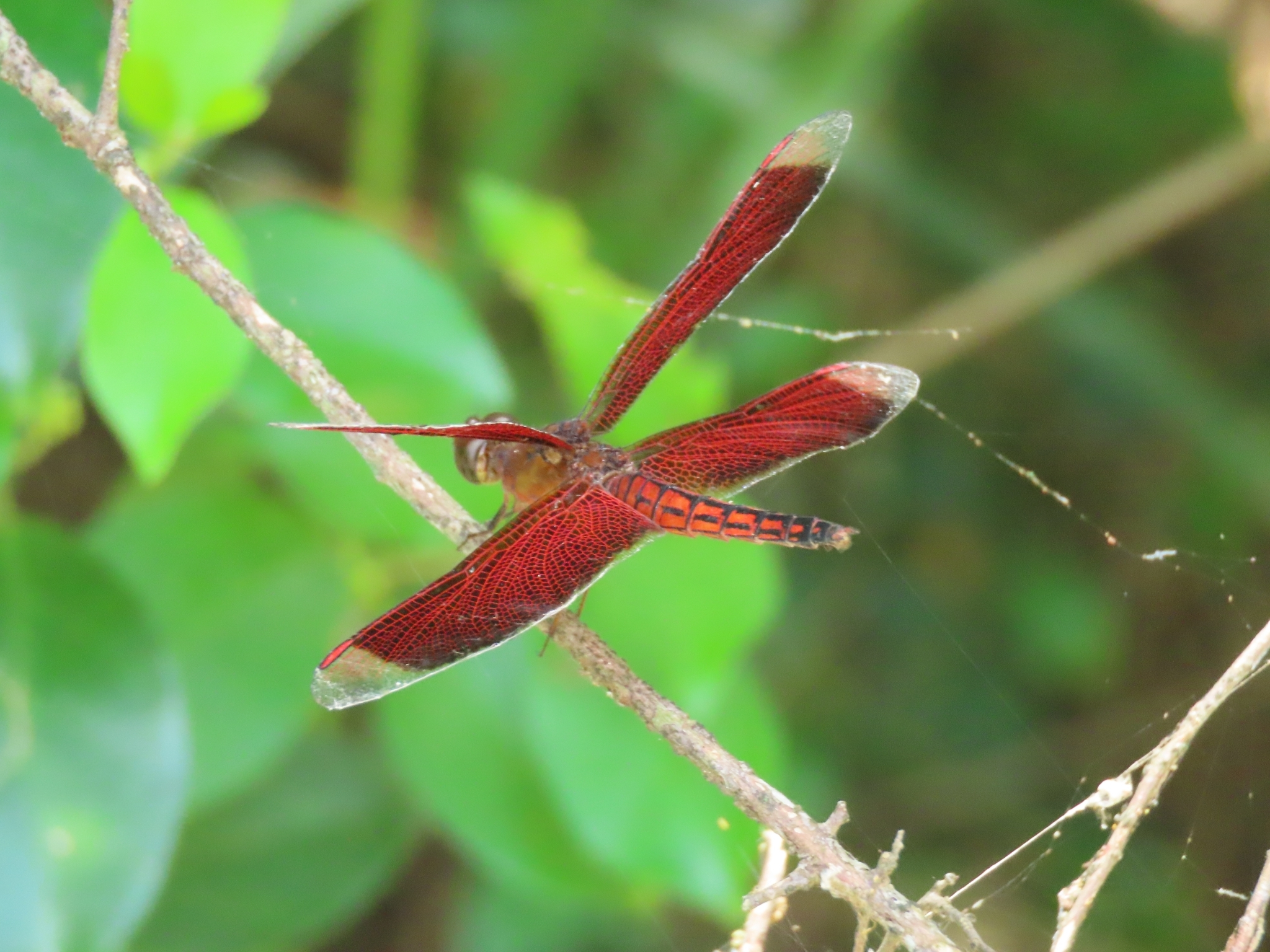
- Male
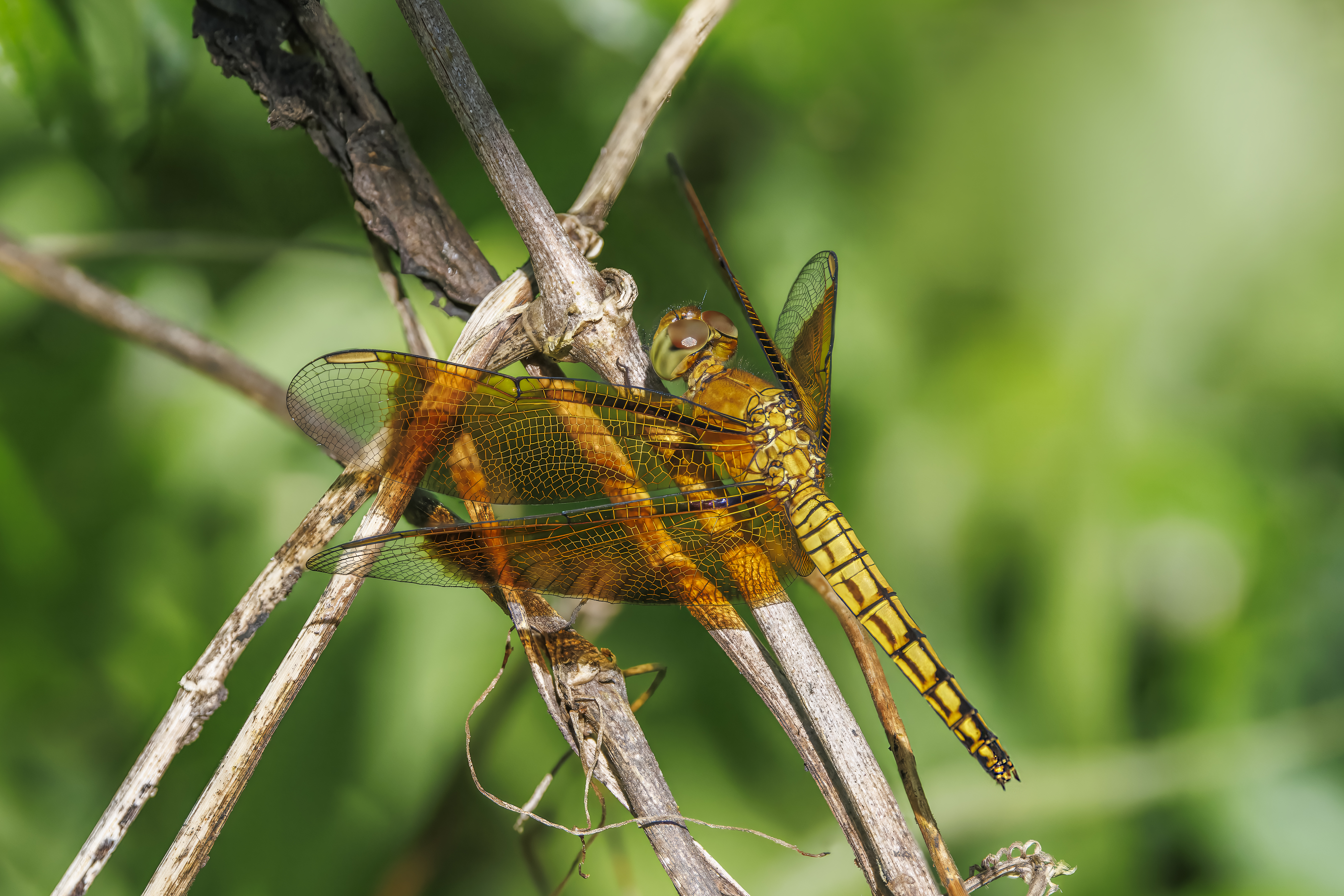
- Female

Scientific classification
- Kingdom: Animalia
- Phylum: Arthropoda
- Clade: Pancrustacea
- Class: Insecta
- Order: Odonata
- Infraorder: Anisoptera
- Family: Libellulidae
- Genus: Neurothemis
- Species: N. taiwanensis

Binomial name
- Neurothemis taiwanensis Seehausen & Dow, 2016

= Neurothemis taiwanensis =

Species of dragonfly

Neurothemis taiwanensis is a species of skimmer in the dragonfly family Libellulidae. It is found in Taiwan.

== Description and habitat ==
Males are red throughout, with transparent wing tips and black stripes dividing the abdomen. Its wings are dark in color with red veins. Females have thicker abdominal stripes and may gradually change color between red and yellowish brown. Juvenile males may also display the yellow-brown coloration. Adults range from 34-42mm in length.

This species is commonly found near still or running water, such as ponds, paddy fields, and streams, at altitudes below 1500 in elevation.
