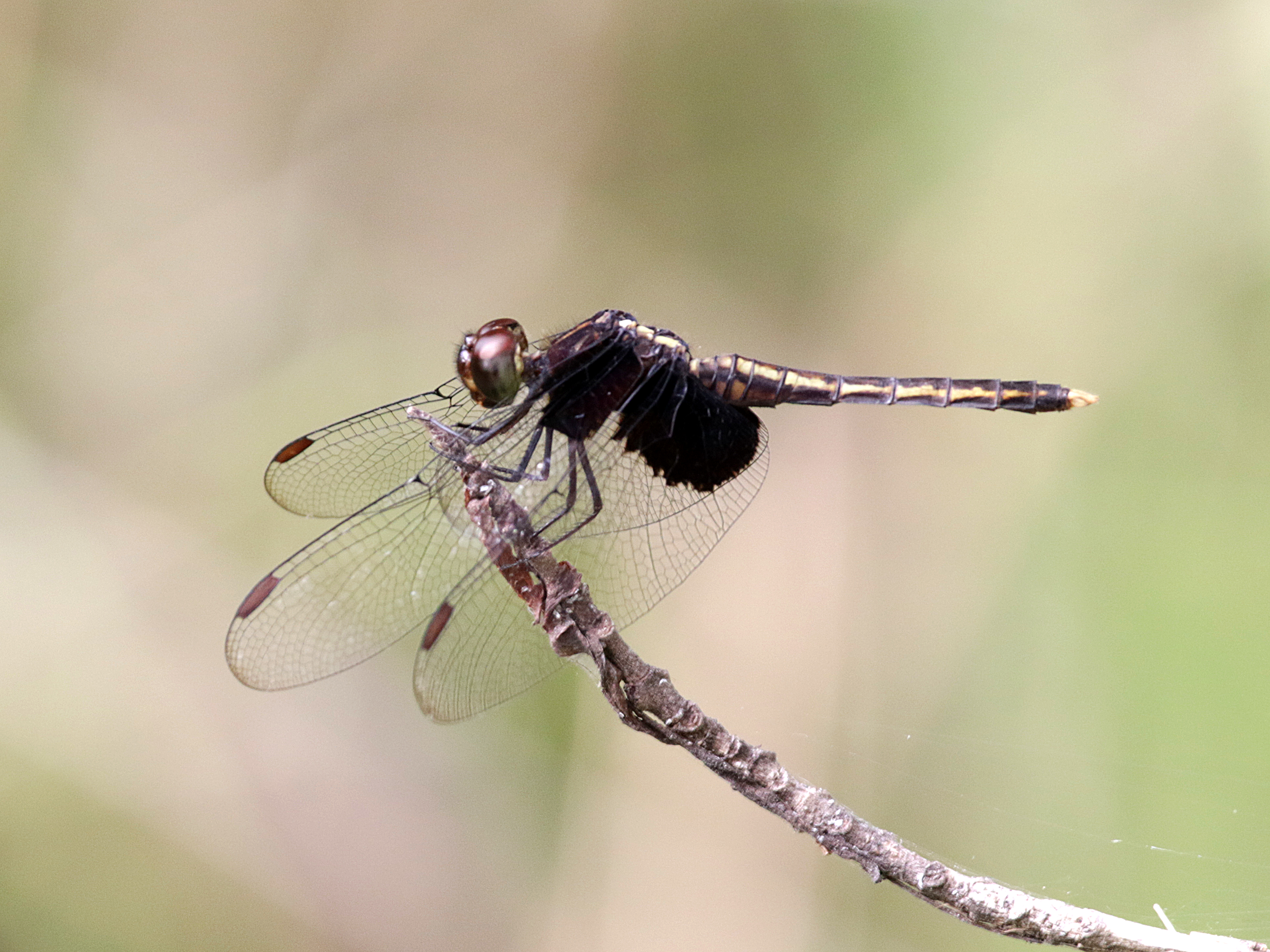
- Male at Mataranka, Northern Territory, Australia
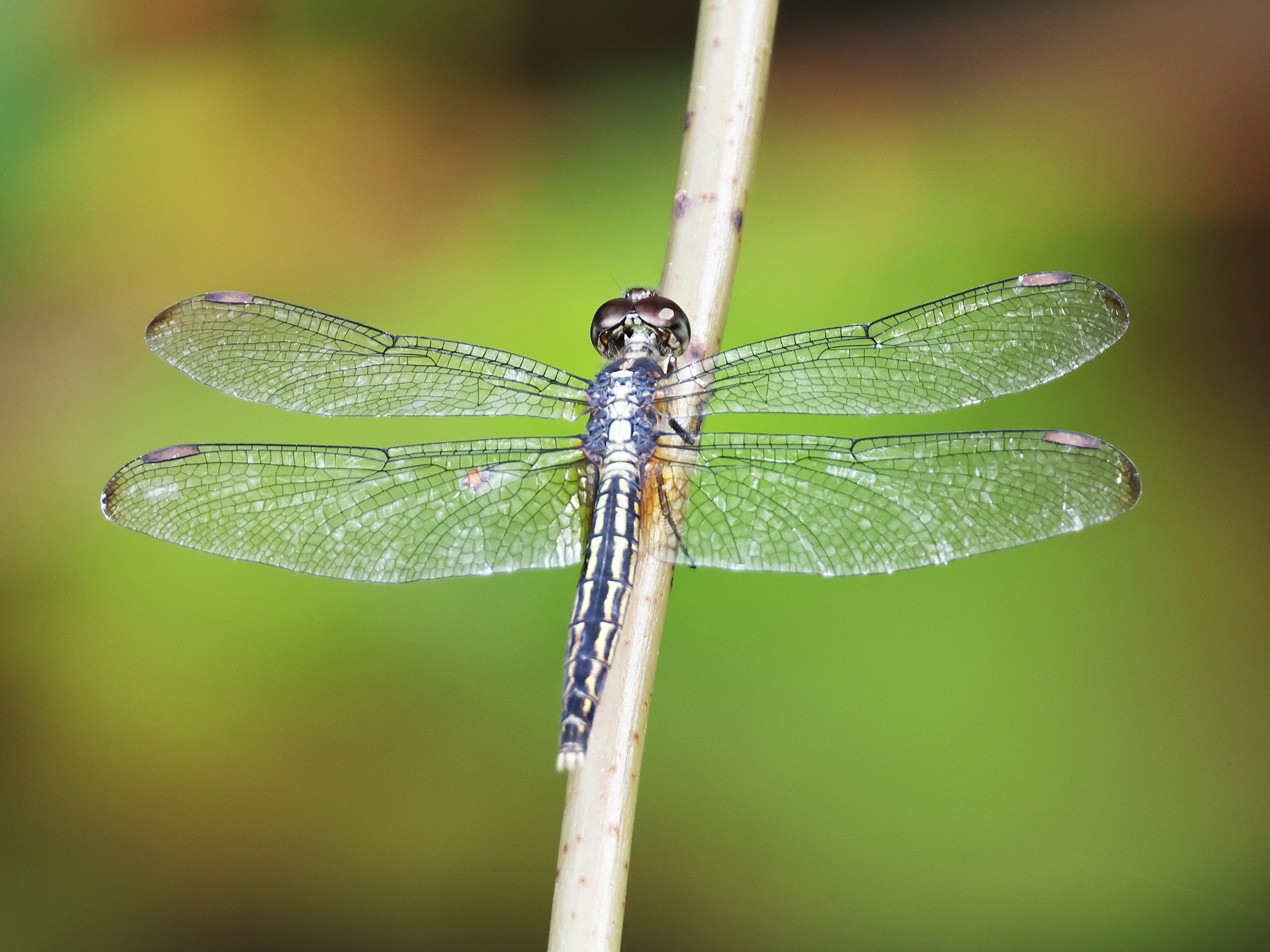
- Female, Cairns, Queensland

Conservation status
- Least Concern (IUCN 3.1)

Scientific classification
- Kingdom: Animalia
- Phylum: Arthropoda
- Clade: Pancrustacea
- Class: Insecta
- Order: Odonata
- Infraorder: Anisoptera
- Family: Libellulidae
- Genus: Neurothemis
- Species: N. oligoneura

Binomial name
- Neurothemis oligoneura Brauer, 1867

= Neurothemis oligoneura =

Spotted grasshawk

Species of dragonfly

Neurothemis oligoneura is a species of dragonfly of the family Libellulidae, known as the spotted grasshawk. It is a medium-sized dragonfly with extensive darkening near the base of the wings found in northern Australia and New Guinea.

== Etymology ==
The genus name Neurothemis combines the Greek νεῦρον (neuron, "nerve" or "vein") and -themis, from Greek Θέμις (Themis), the goddess of divine law, order and justice.

The species name oligoneura is derived from the Greek ὀλίγος (oligos, "few") and νεῦρον (neuron, "nerve" or "vein"), referring to the open network of secondary veins in the wing.

== Gallery ==
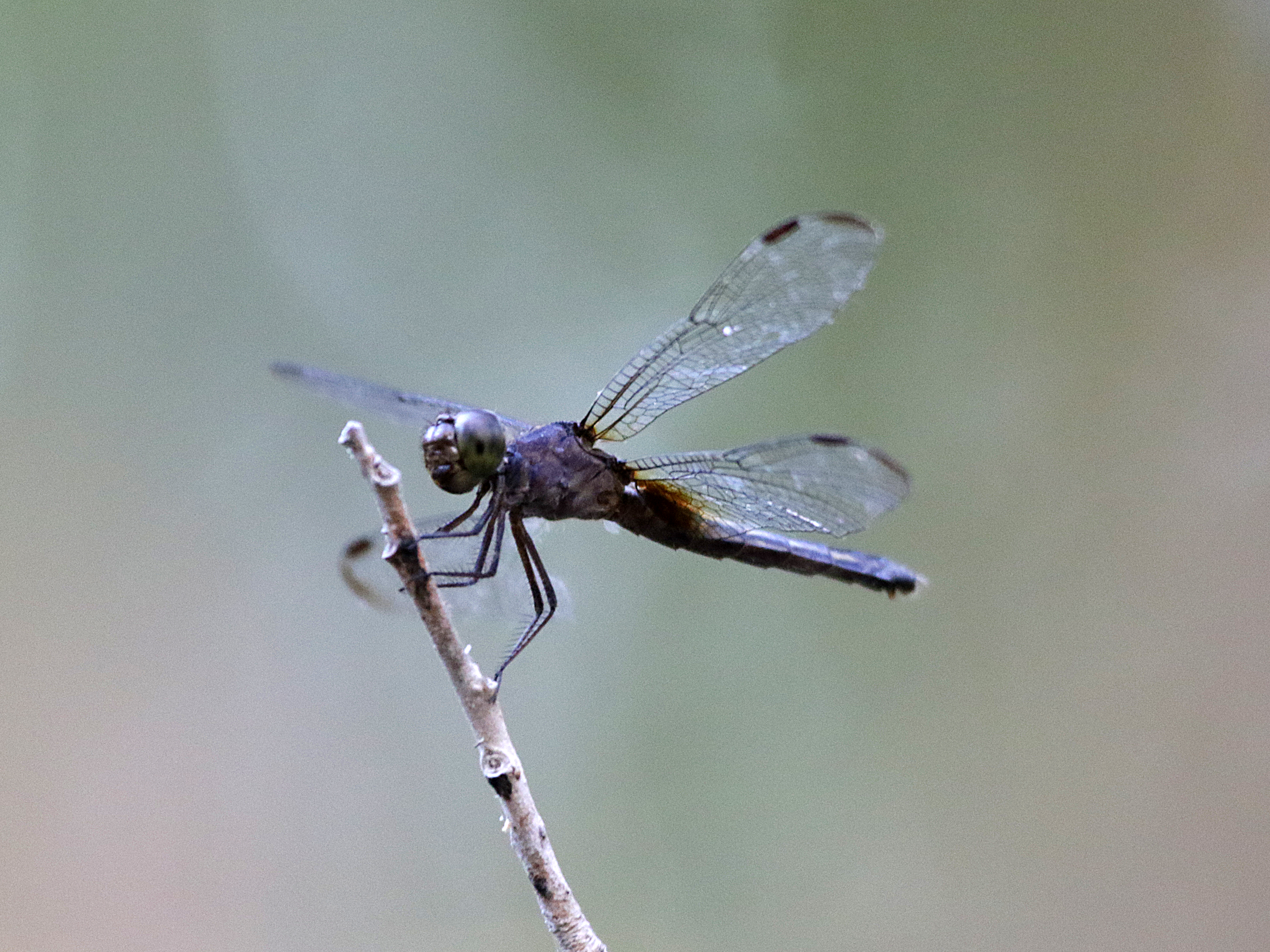
Female

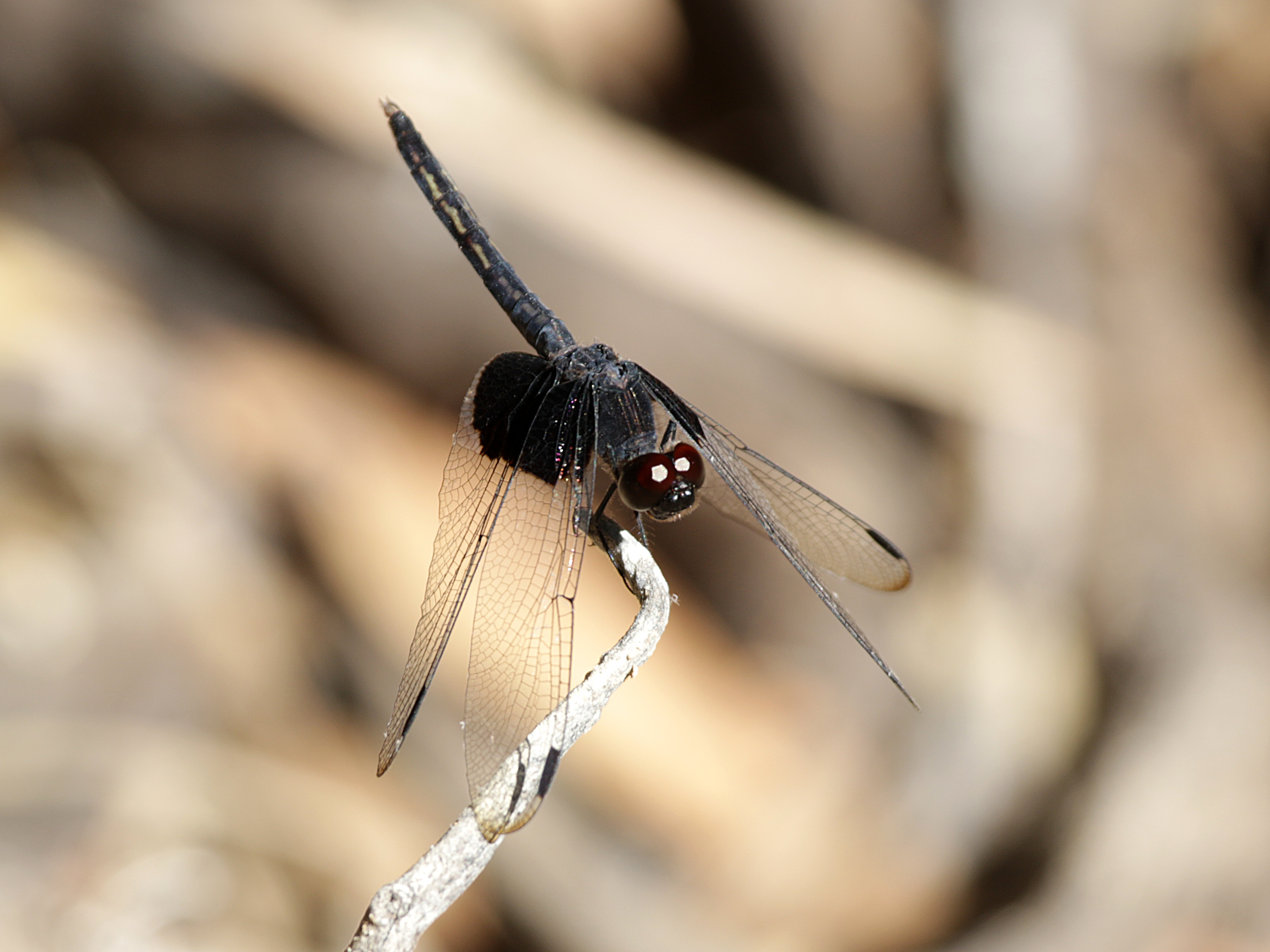
Male, forward quarter

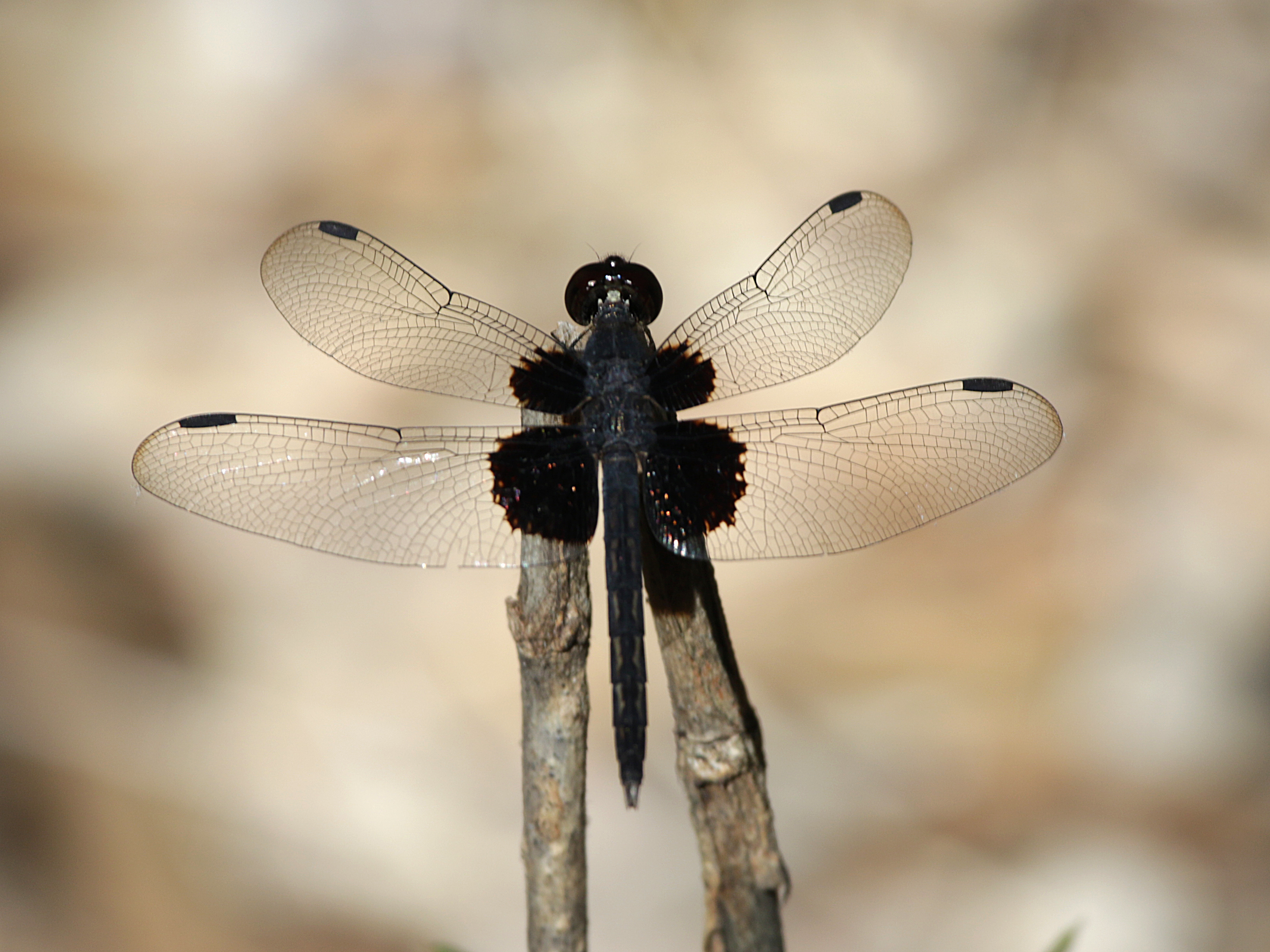
Male, dorsal view

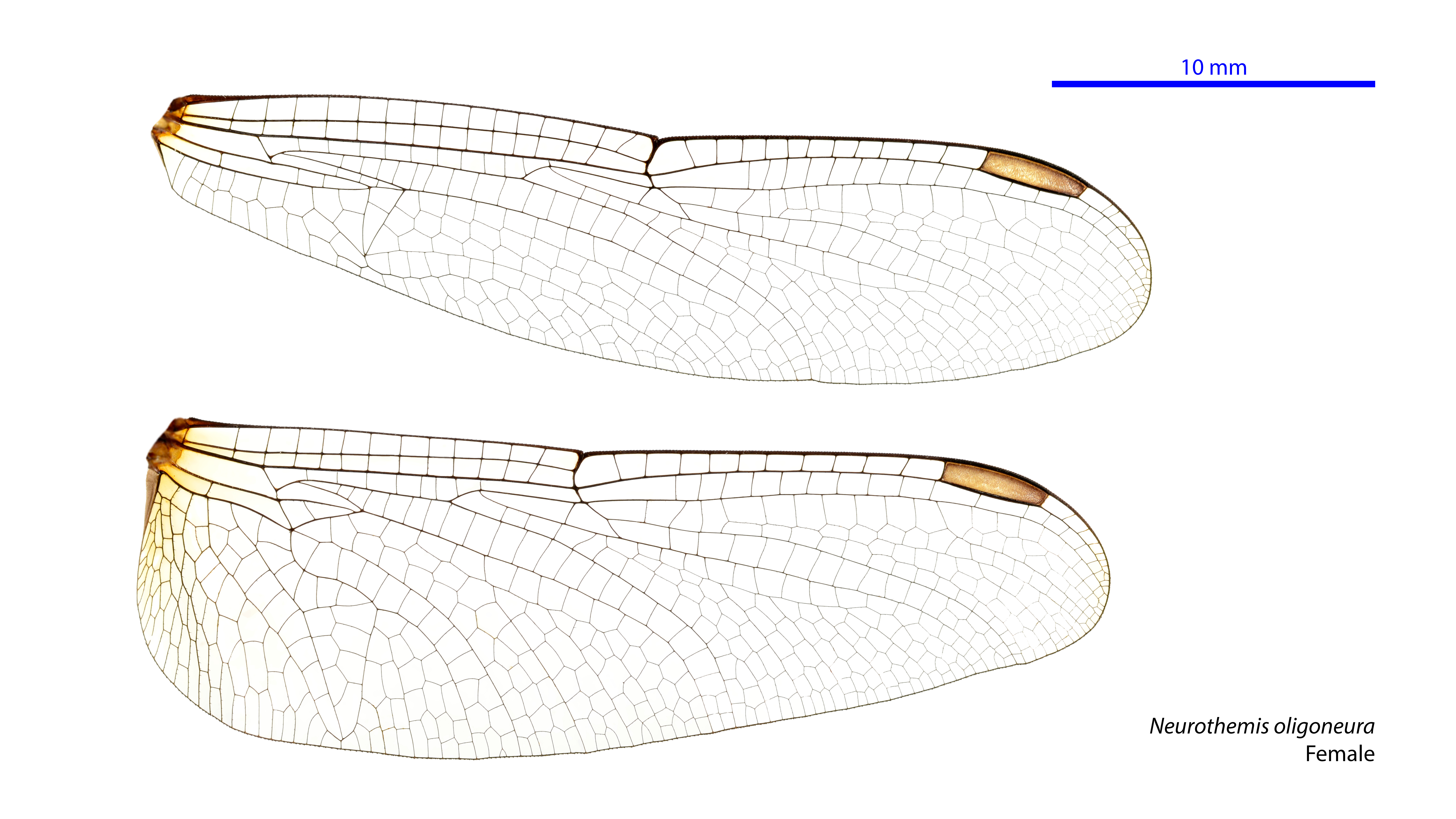
Female wings

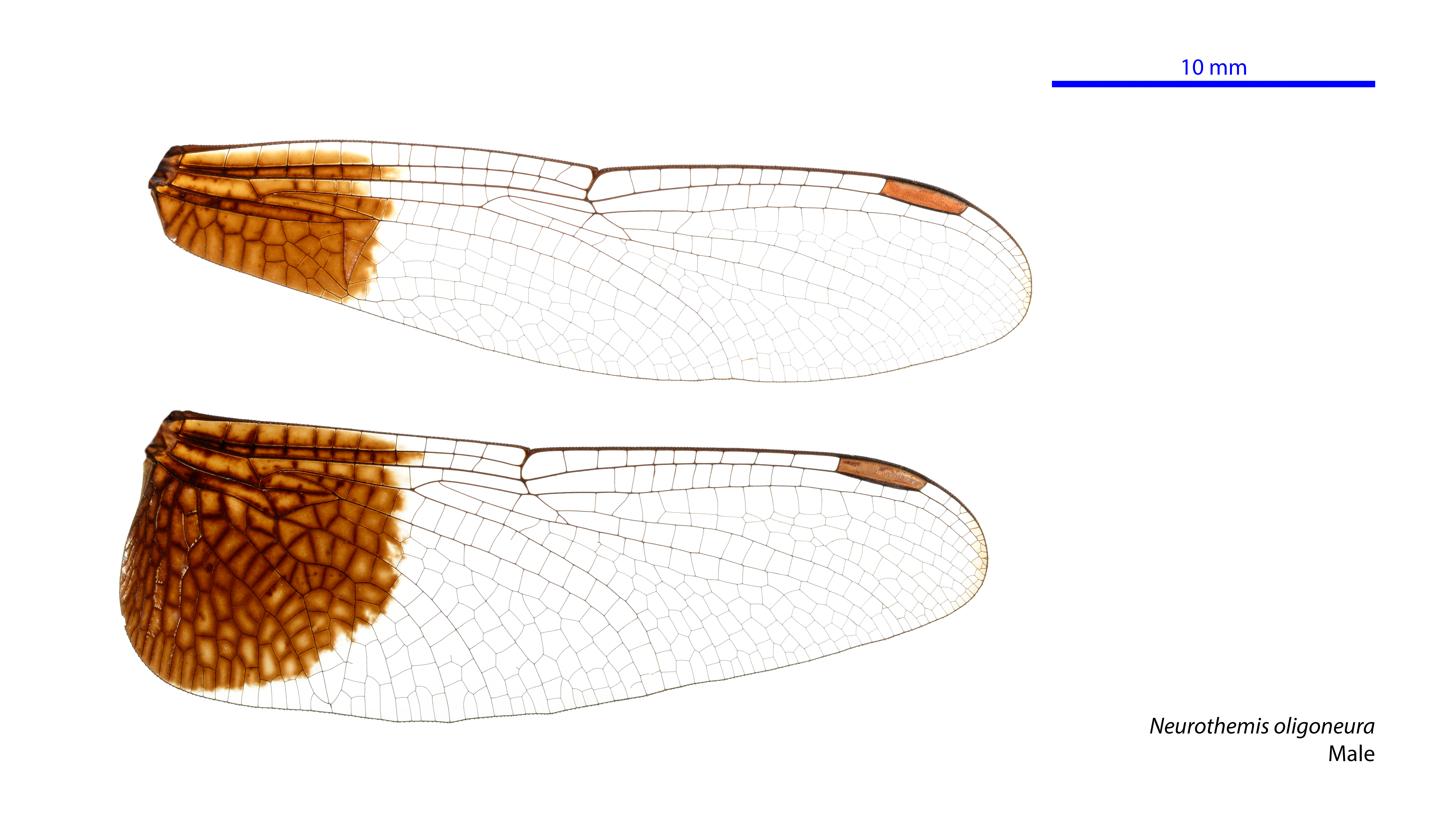
Male wings

== See also ==
- List of Odonata species of Australia
