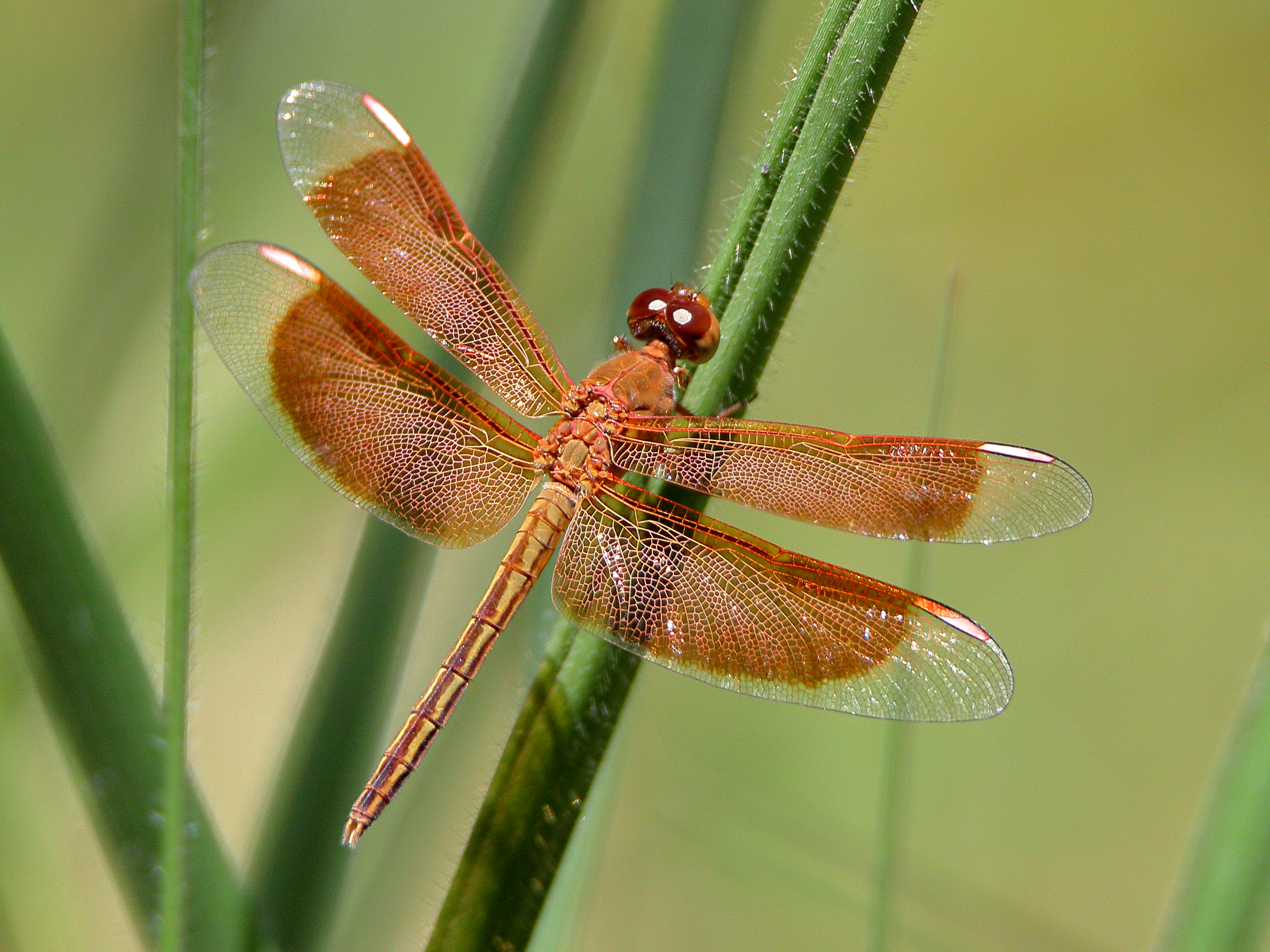
- Painted grasshawk male, Cairns
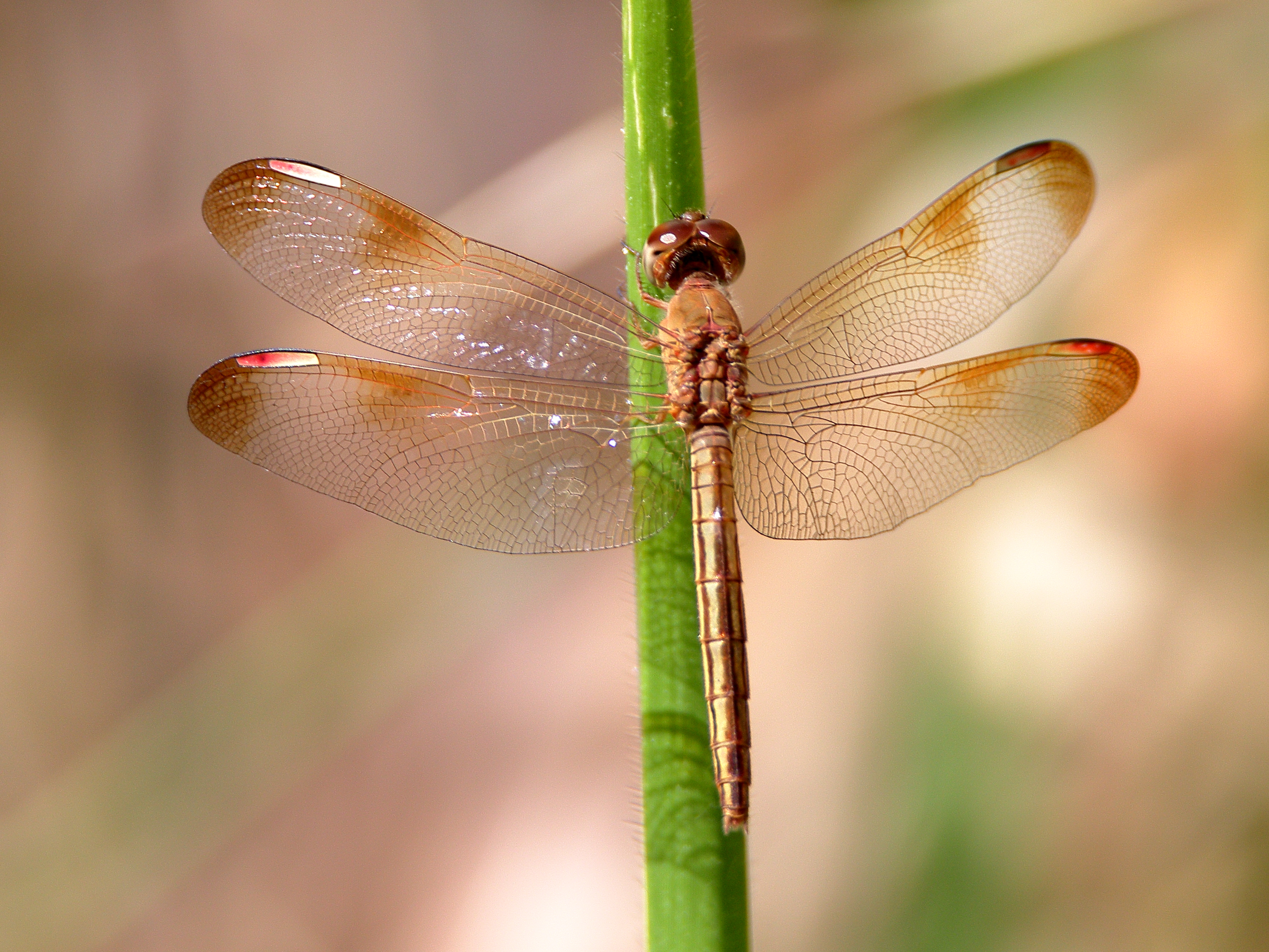
- Painted grasshawk female, Cairns, Australia

Conservation status
- Least Concern (IUCN 3.1)

Scientific classification
- Kingdom: Animalia
- Phylum: Arthropoda
- Clade: Pancrustacea
- Class: Insecta
- Order: Odonata
- Infraorder: Anisoptera
- Family: Libellulidae
- Genus: Neurothemis
- Species: N. stigmatizans

Binomial name
- Neurothemis stigmatizans (Fabricius, 1775)

Synonyms
- Libellula stigmatizans Fabricius, 1775; Libellula oculata Fabricius, 1775; Libellula bramina Guérin-Méneville, 1830; Neurothemis diplax Brauer, 1867

= Neurothemis stigmatizans =

Species of dragonfly

Neurothemis stigmatizans, known as the painted grasshawk, is a species of dragonfly in the family Libellulidae. The genus Neurothemis is distributed from India to the western Pacific. This species is found in northern Australia in an arc from the southern Queensland border to Broome, Western Australia.

Neurothemis stigmatizans is a medium sized dragonfly (wingspan 60-85mm) which inhabits still waters in the vicinity of grassy areas. The male abdomen is reddish-brown with a lighter dorsal stripe, his wings have deep reddish-brown markings that extend past the nodus, with paler contrasting veins. The female is pale greenish-yellow with a dark dorsal stripe and side stripe; her wings are mostly hyaline with a dark smudge beyond the nodus and dark wingtips. The pterostigma of both sexes is pink or pale coloured.

== Etymology ==
The genus name Neurothemis combines the Greek νεῦρον (neuron, "nerve" or "vein") and -themis, from Greek Θέμις (Themis), the goddess of divine law, order and justice.

The species name stigmatizans is derived from the Latin stigmatizo ("to mark with a spot or brand"), likely referring to the distinctive markings on the wings.

== Gallery ==
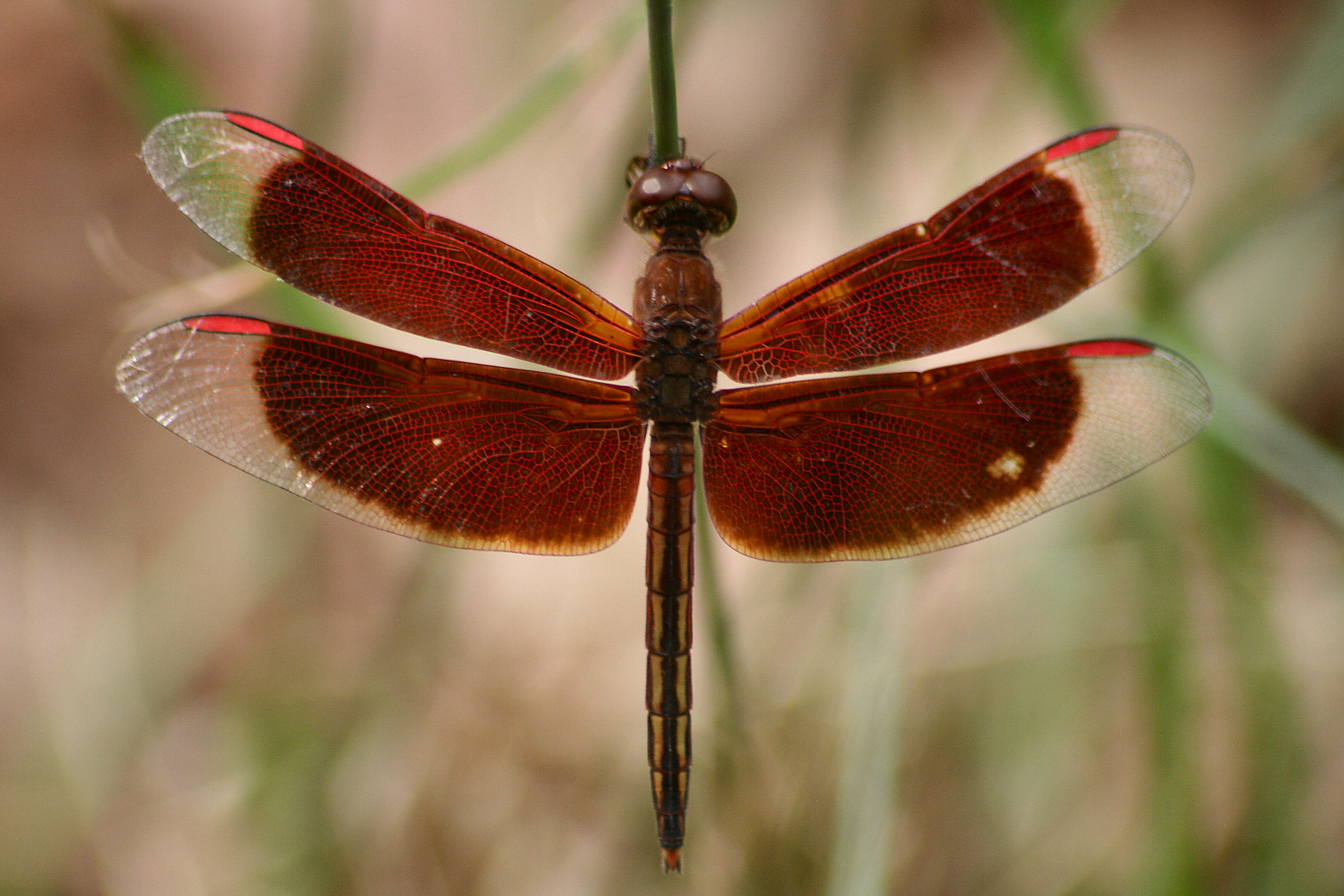
Male

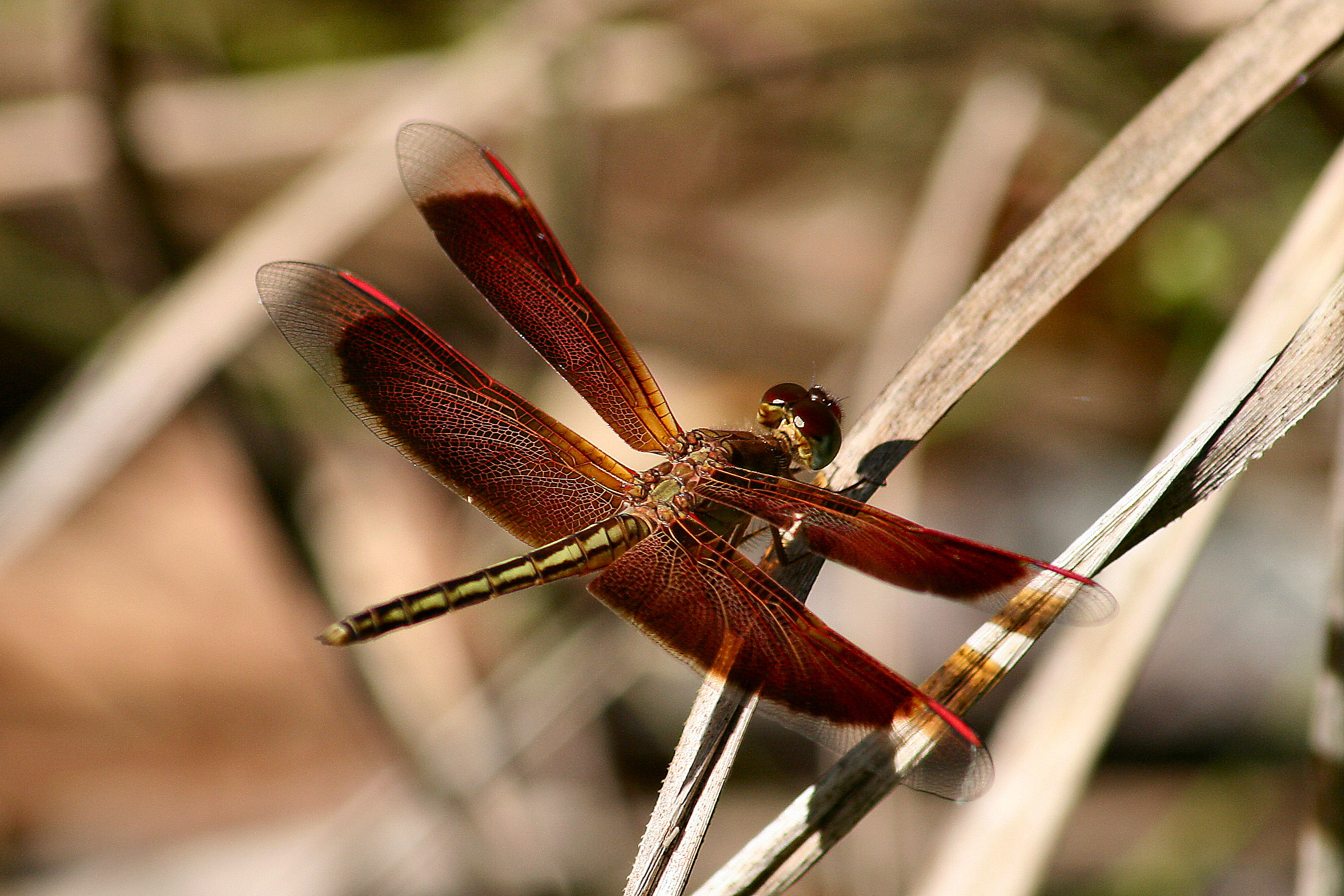
Male at rest

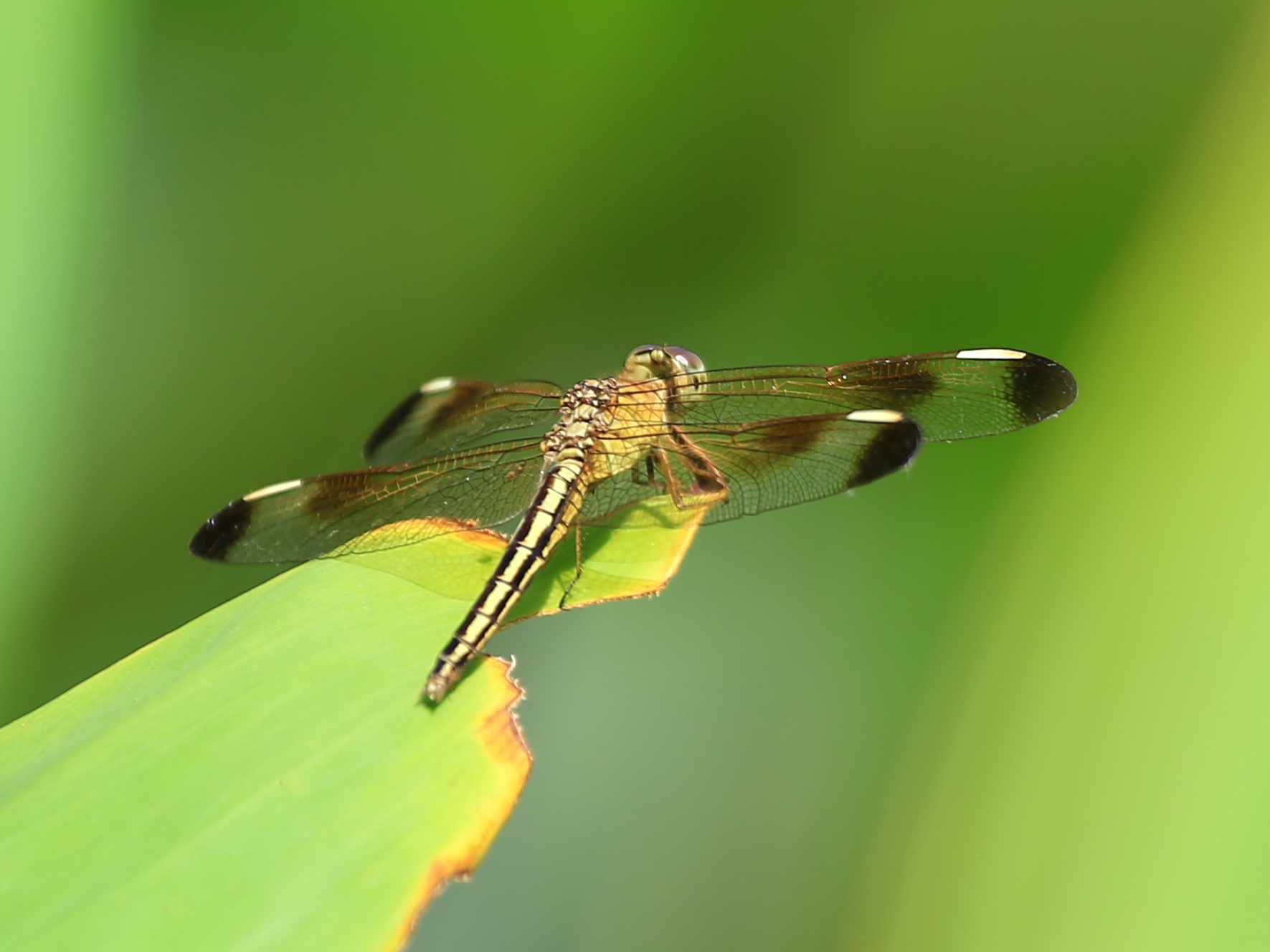
Female has a distinctive and different wing colouring

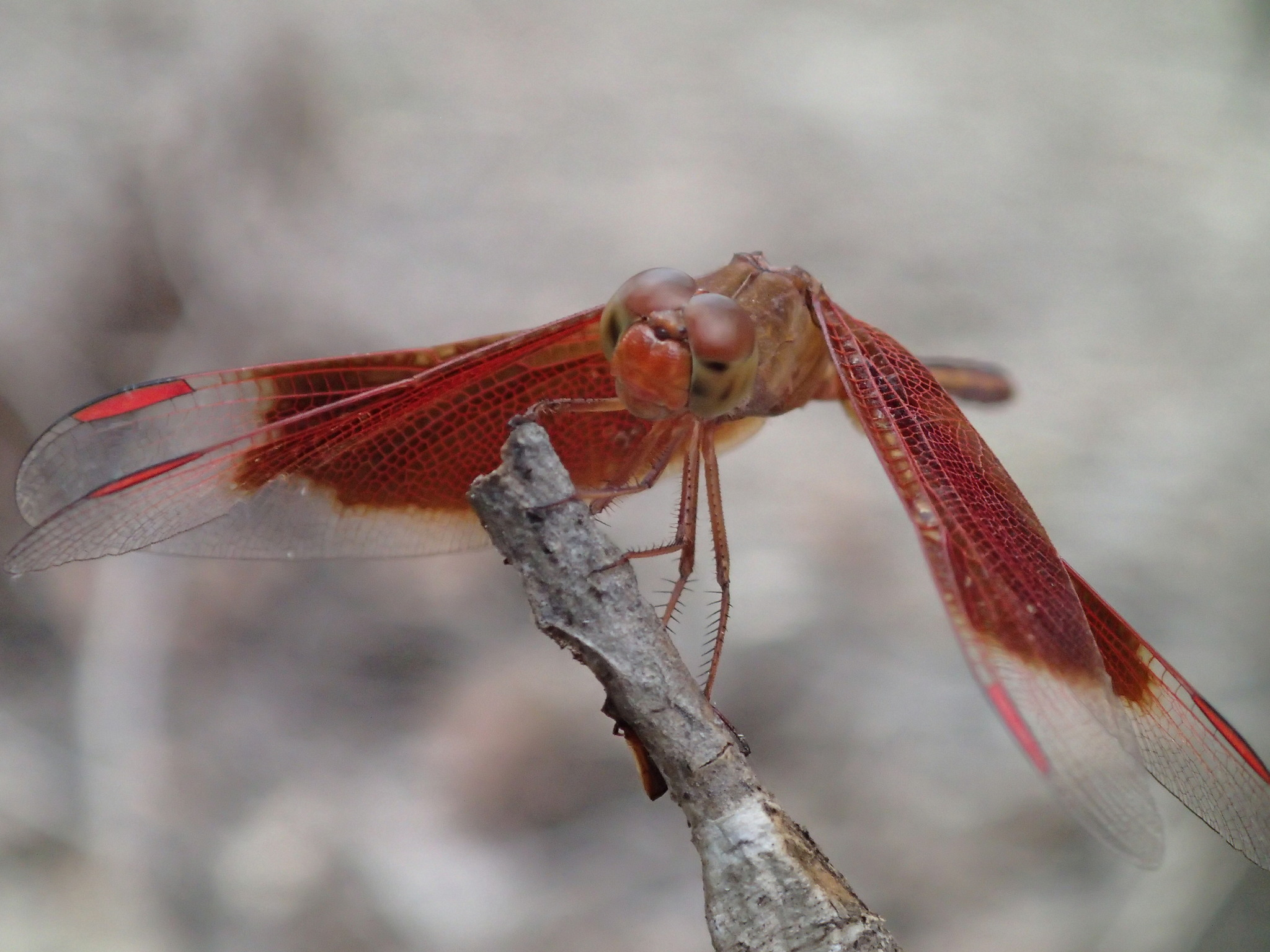
Male face

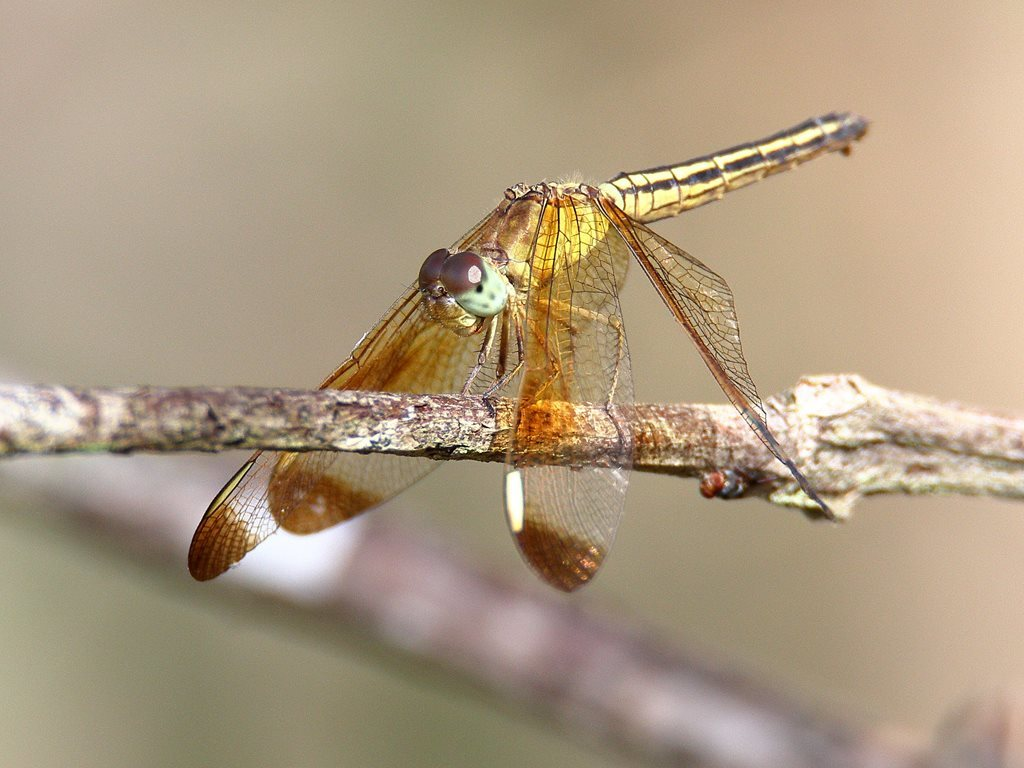
Female face

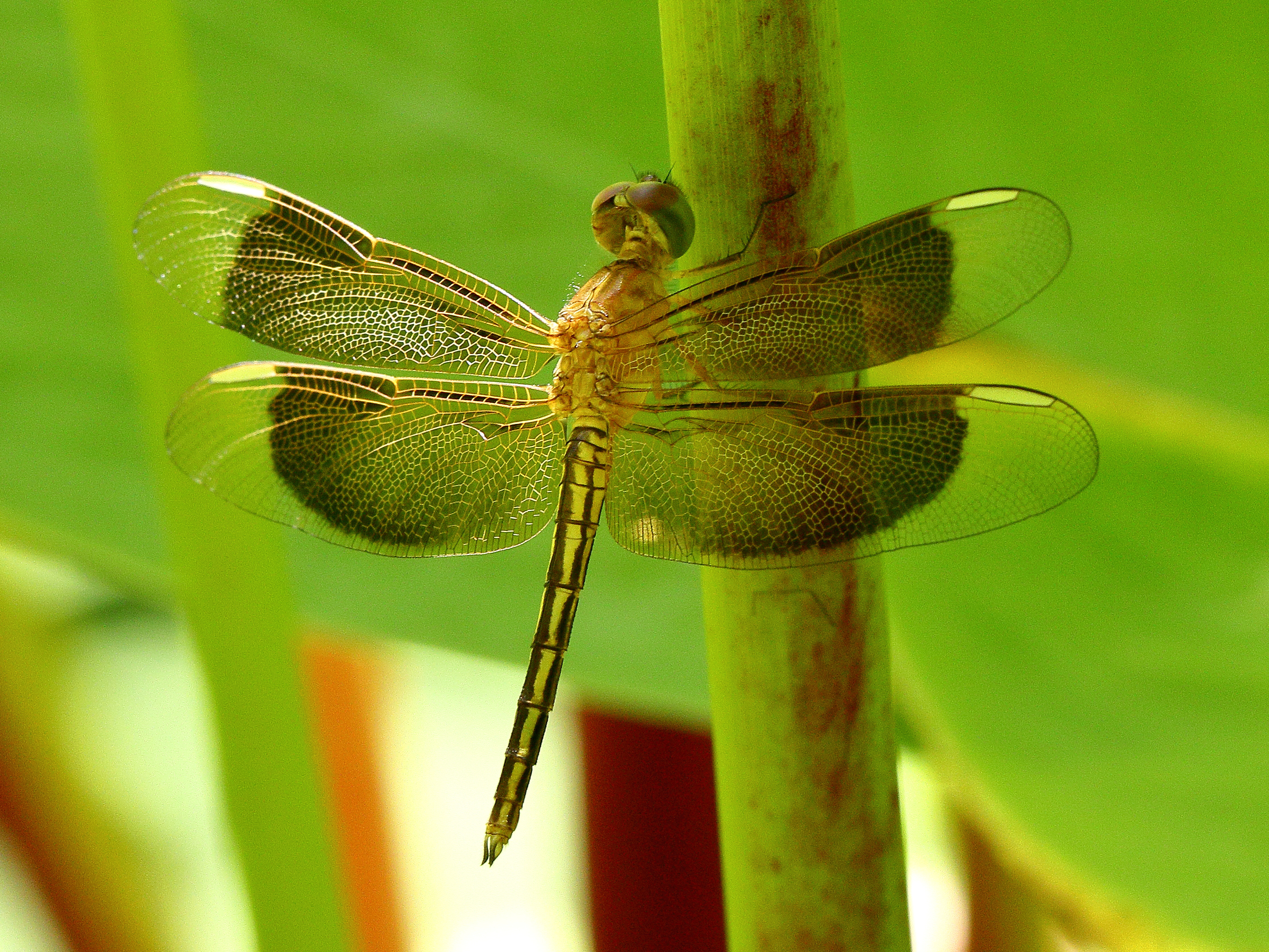
Juvenile male in Cairns

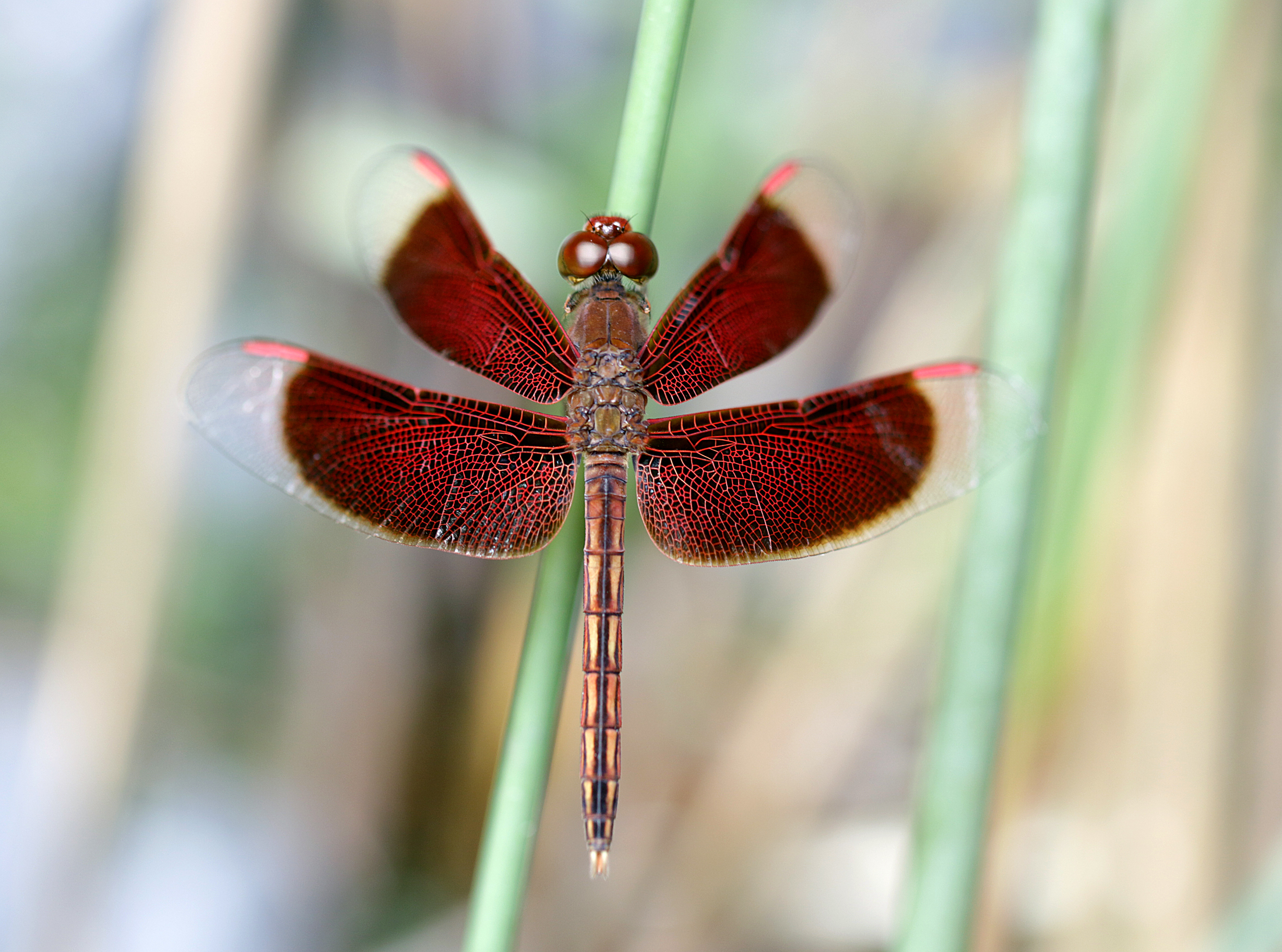
Adult male depicting prominent wing veins

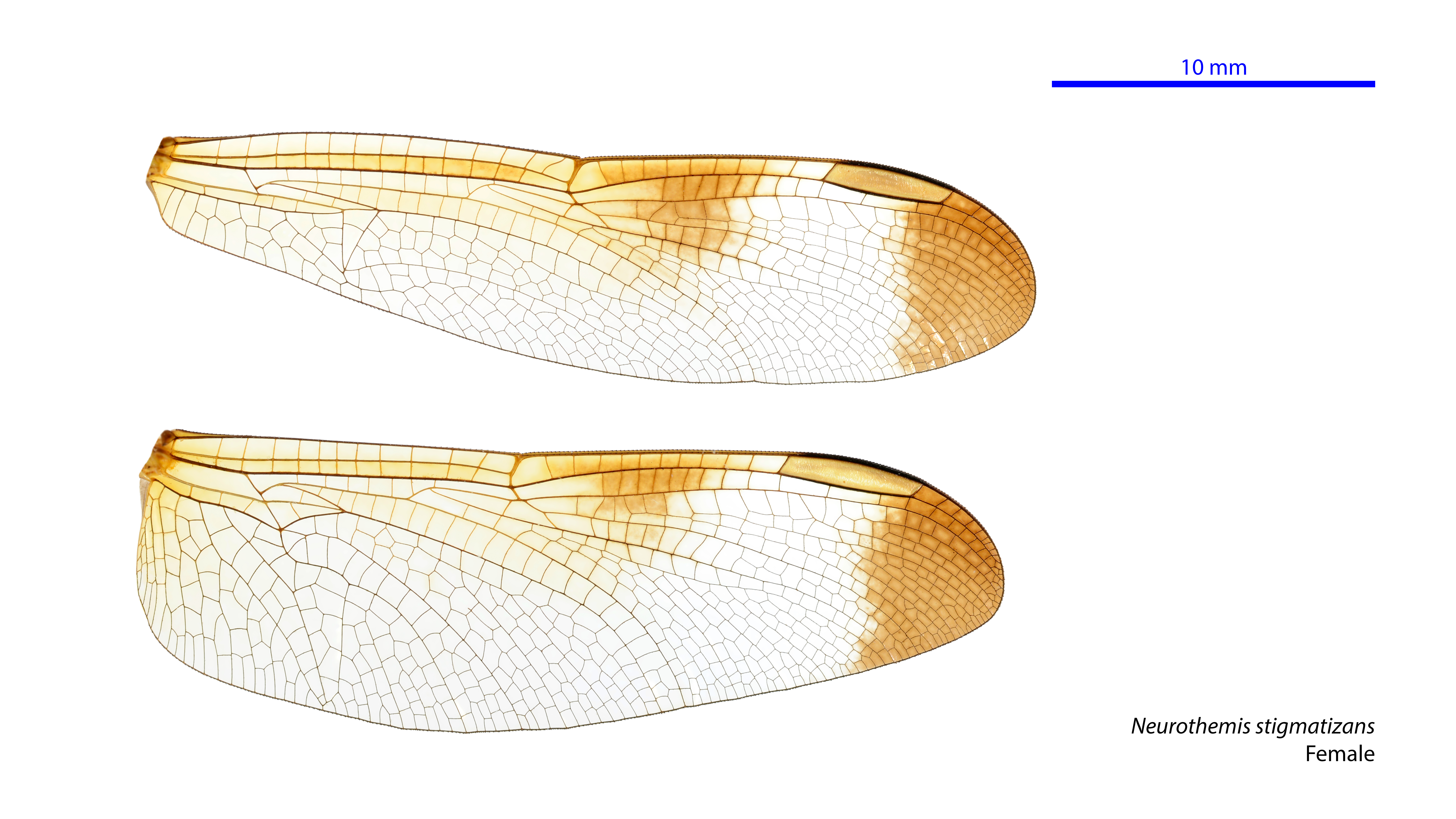
Female wings

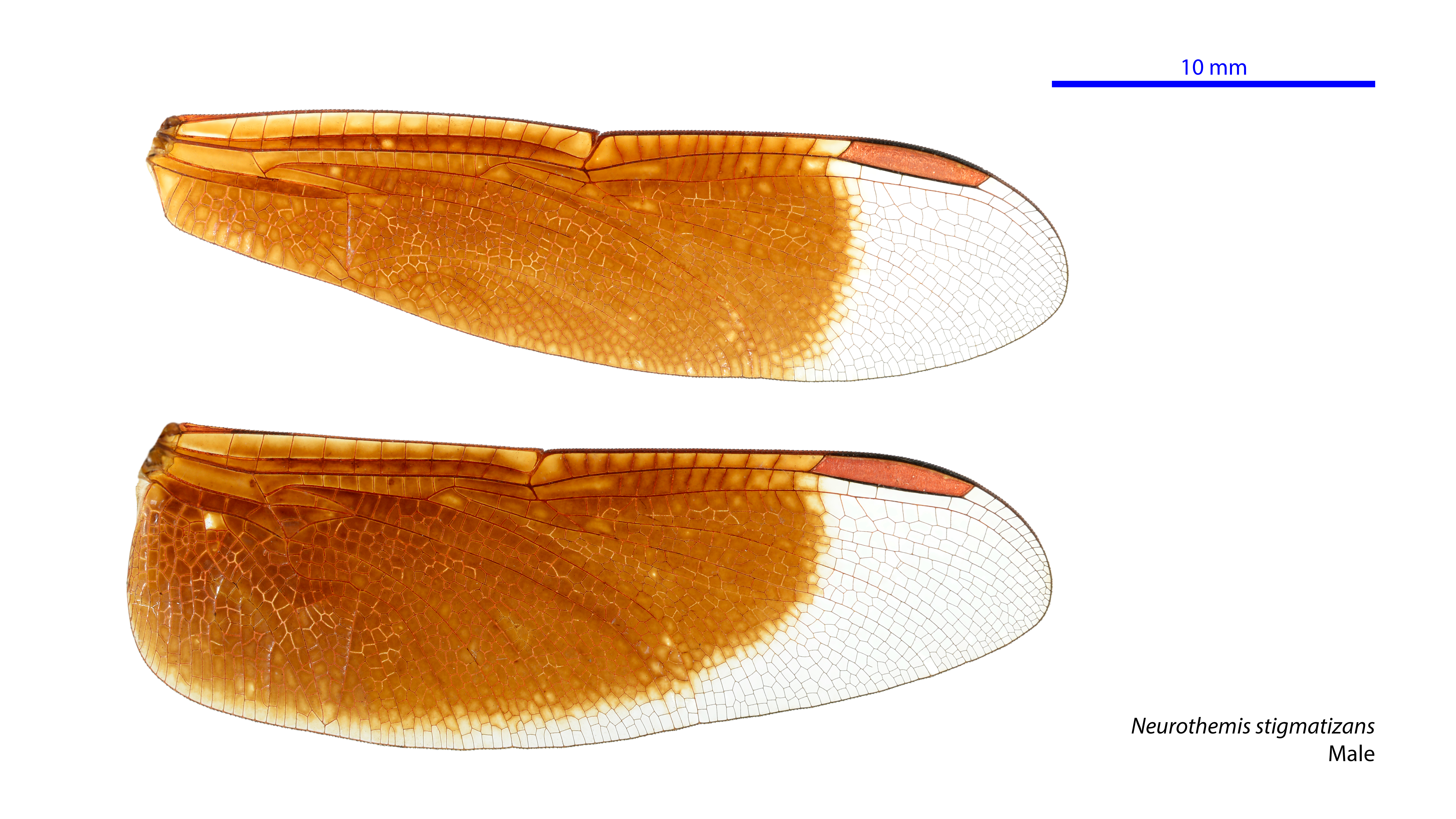
Male wings

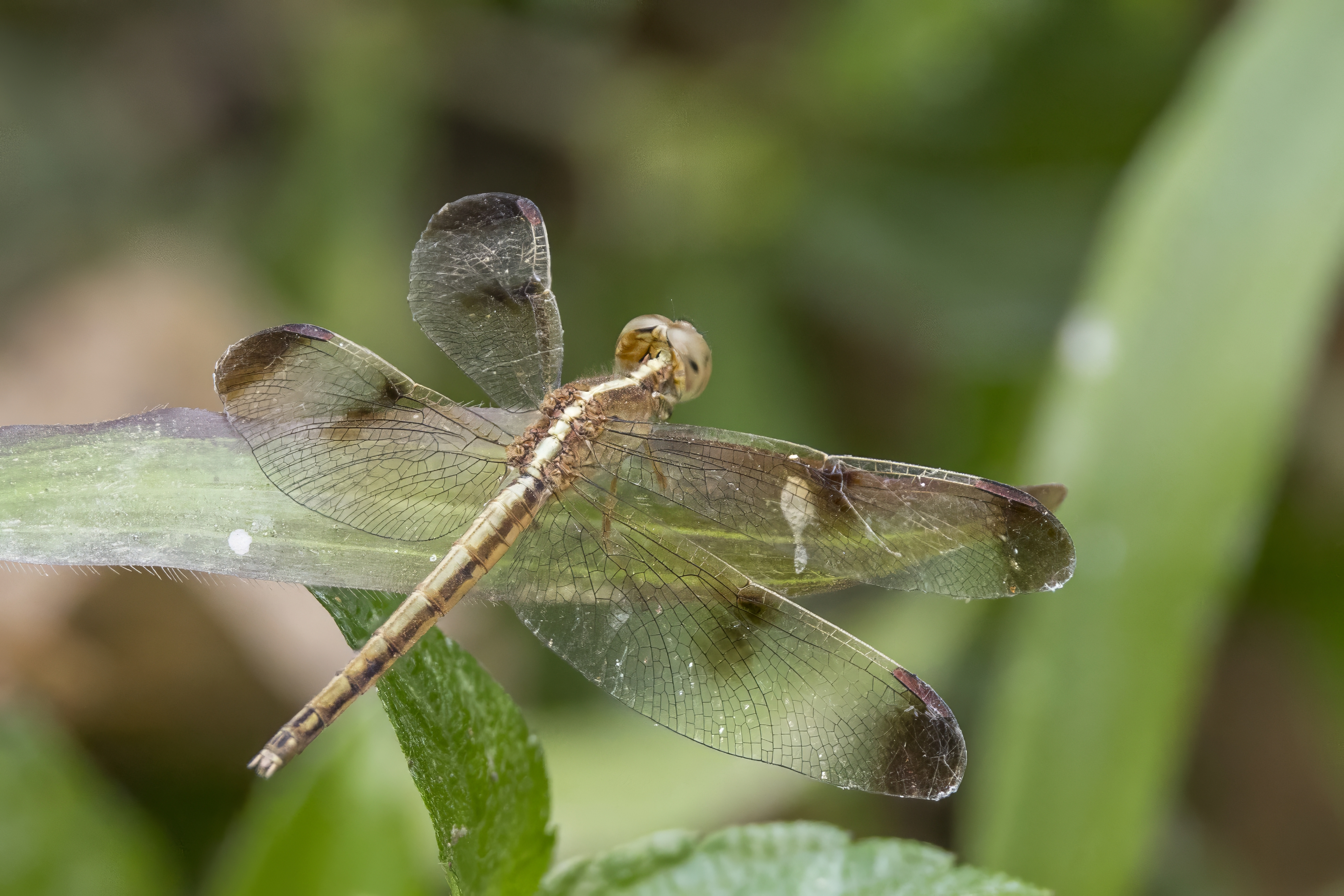
N. S. bramina, heteromorphic female Cambodia
