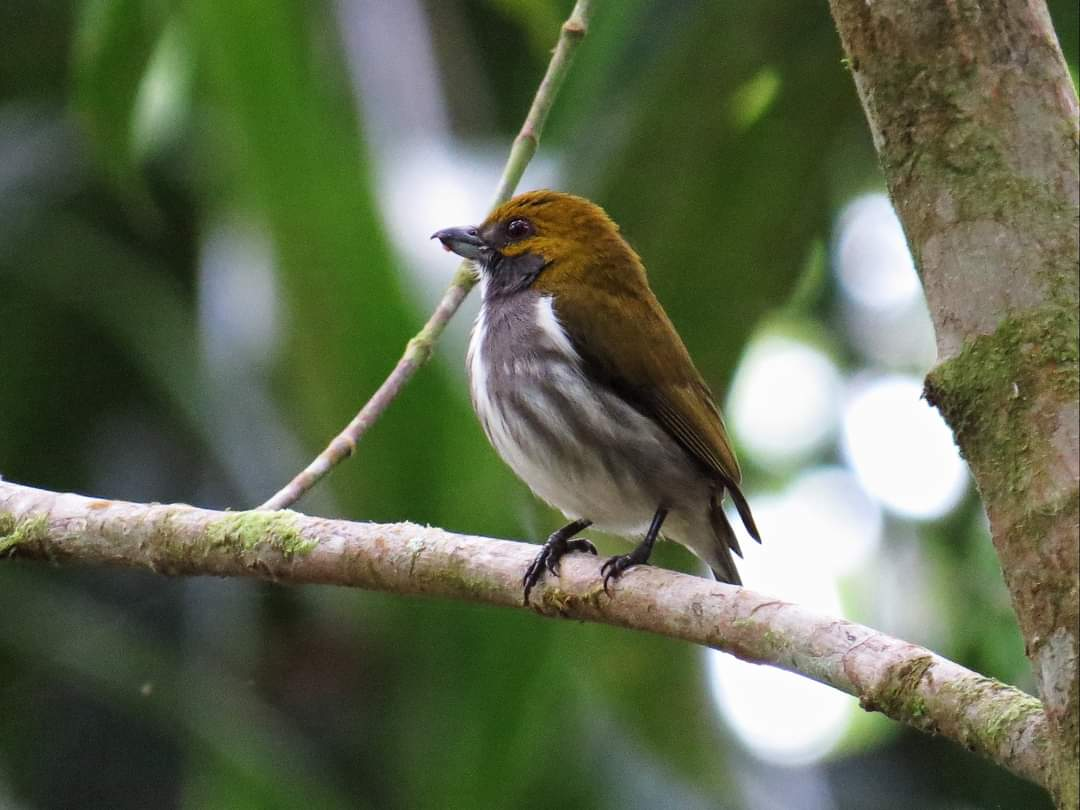
- ssp. parsonsi
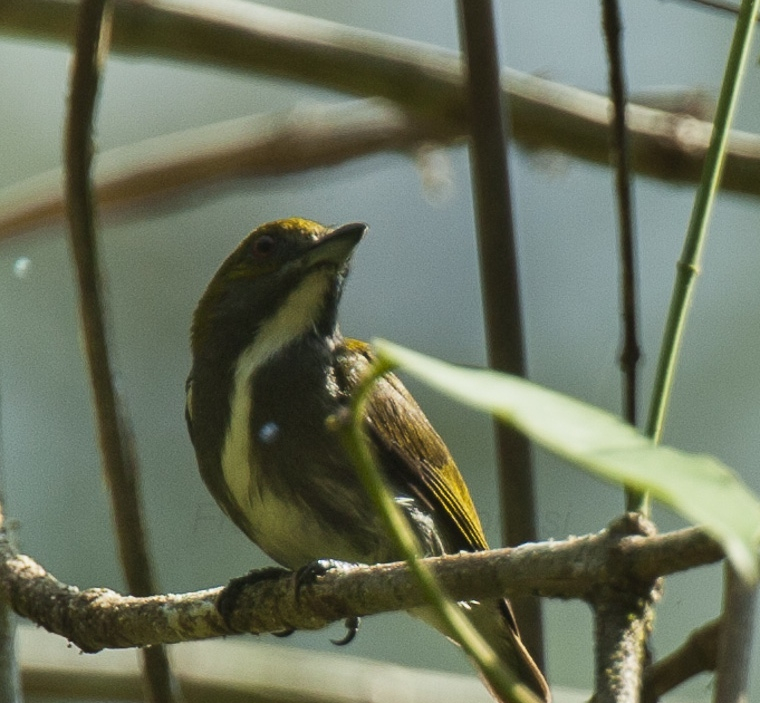
- ssp. olivaceus

Conservation status
- Least Concern (IUCN 3.1)

Scientific classification
- Kingdom: Animalia
- Phylum: Chordata
- Class: Aves
- Order: Passeriformes
- Family: Dicaeidae
- Genus: Pachyglossa
- Species: P. olivacea

Binomial name
- Pachyglossa olivacea (Tweeddale, 1877)

Synonyms
- Prionochilus olivaceus

= Olive-backed flowerpecker =

Species of bird

The olive-backed flowerpecker (Pachyglossa olivacea) is a species of bird in the family Dicaeidae. It is endemic to the Philippines. Its natural habitat is tropical moist lowland forest. This species was formerly placed in the genus Prionochilus.

== Taxonomy ==
Three subspecies are recognized:

- P. o. parsonsi (McGregor, 1927) – Luzon group (north Philippines)
- P. o. olivacea (Tweeddale, 1877) – Mindanao group (south Philippines)
- P. o. samarensis (Steere, 1890) – East Visayas (central east Philippines)

== Behaviour and ecology ==
Feeds on small fruits, the nectar of mistletoes and flowers.Found singly, in pairs or mixed species flocks with other flowerpeckers and small birds. Often observed near fruiting and flowering trees especially hagimit (Ficus minahassae). Nesting has been recorded in August and birds in breeding condition with enlarged have been collected in May. Otherwise, no other information on its mating, breeding and fledgeling habits.

== Habitat and conservation status ==
Its natural habitats at tropical moist lowland primary forest and secondary forest up to 1,000 meters above sea level.

The IUCN Red List has assessed this bird as least-concern species although it is uncommon in all parts of its range and is poorly known. More studies are recommended to better understand this species, population and conservation status.
