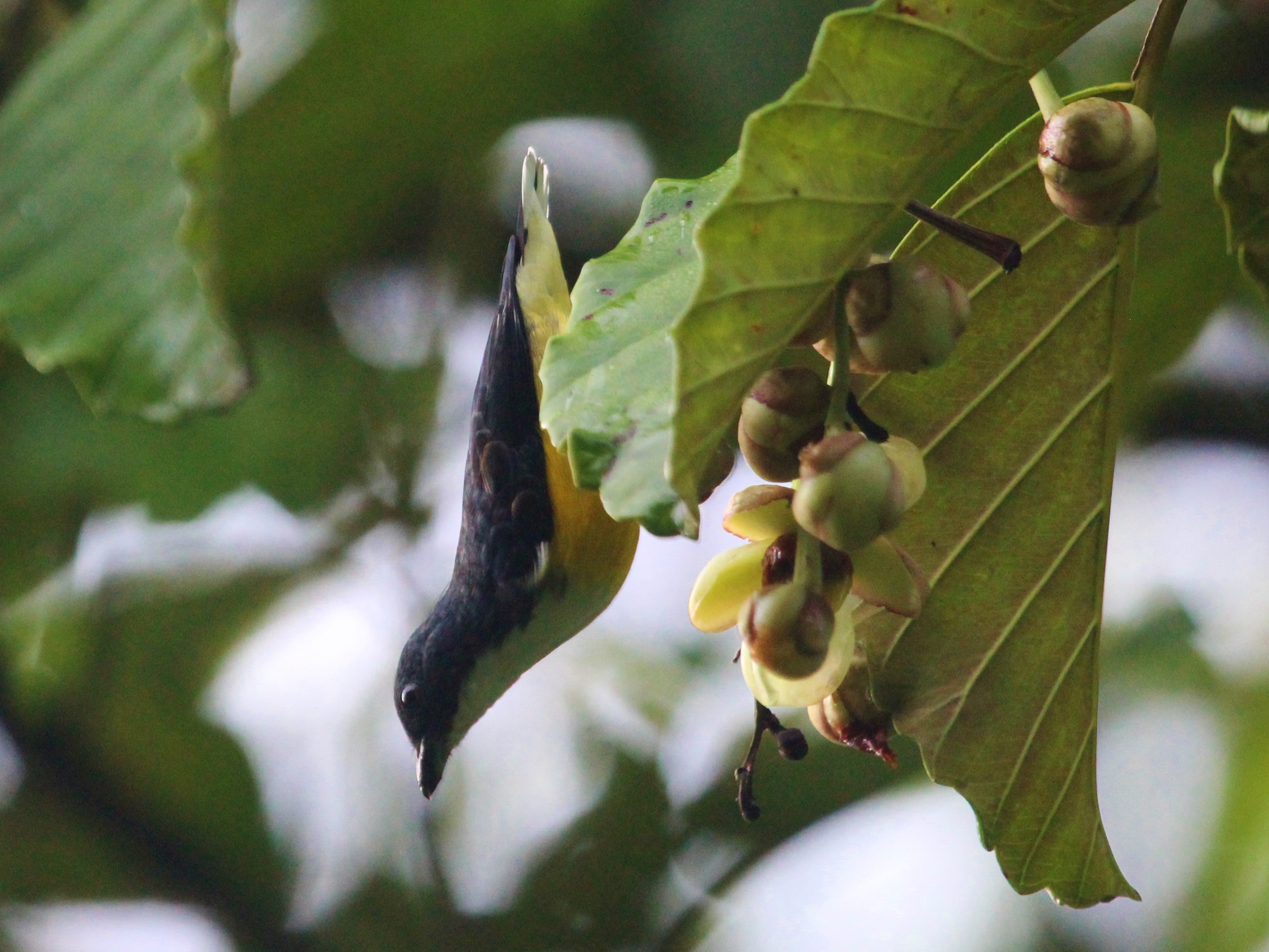
- A male on the grounds of the Blue Magpie Lodge, Sri Lanka

Conservation status
- Near Threatened (IUCN 3.1)

Scientific classification
- Kingdom: Animalia
- Phylum: Chordata
- Class: Aves
- Order: Passeriformes
- Family: Dicaeidae
- Genus: Pachyglossa
- Species: P. vincens

Binomial name
- Pachyglossa vincens (Sclater, PL, 1872)

Synonyms
- Dicaeum vincens

= Legge's flowerpecker =

Species of bird

Legge's flowerpecker (Pachyglossa vincens), also known as the white-throated flowerpecker, is a small passerine bird in the flowerpecker family Dicaeidae. It is an endemic resident breeder in Sri Lanka. It is named after the Australian ornithologist William Vincent Legge. This species was formerly placed in the genus Dicaeum.

The Legge's flowerpecker is a common resident breeding bird of forests and other well-wooded habitats including gardens. Two eggs are laid in a purse-like nest suspended from a tree.

== Description ==
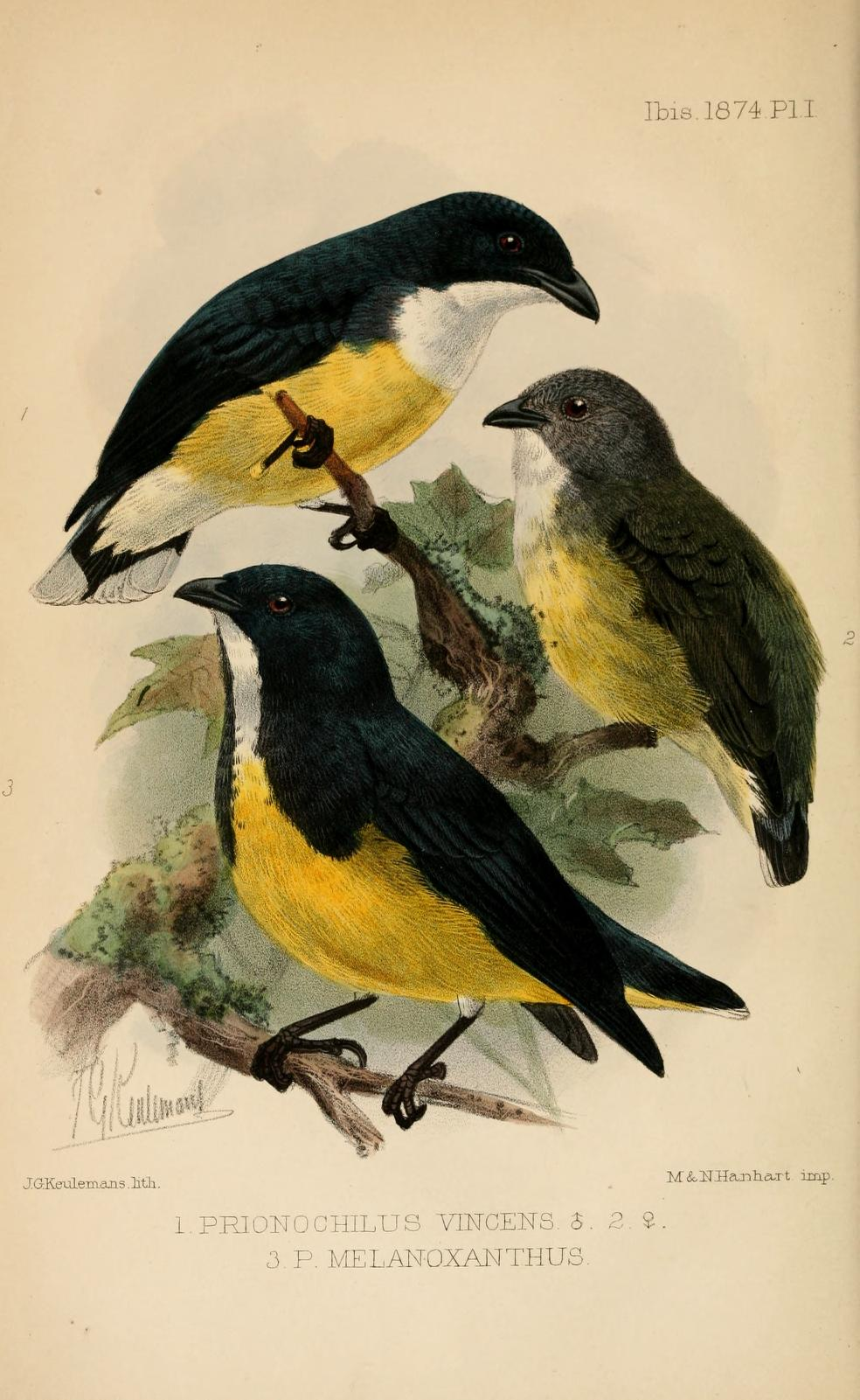
D. vincens male and female above compared with Dicaeum melanozanthum below.

This is a very small passerine but a relatively stout flowerpecker, measuring 10 cm (3.9 in) in total length and weighing approximately 9 g (0.32 oz), with a short tail, short thick curved bill and tubular tongue. The latter features reflect the importance of nectar in its diet, although berries, spiders and insects are also taken.

The male Legge's flowerpecker has blue-black upperparts, a white throat and upper breast, and yellow lower breast and belly. The female is duller, with olive-brown upperparts.

== In culture ==
In Sri Lanka, this bird is known as Lanka Pilalichcha in Sinhala. This bird appears in a one rupee Sri Lankan postal stamp.
