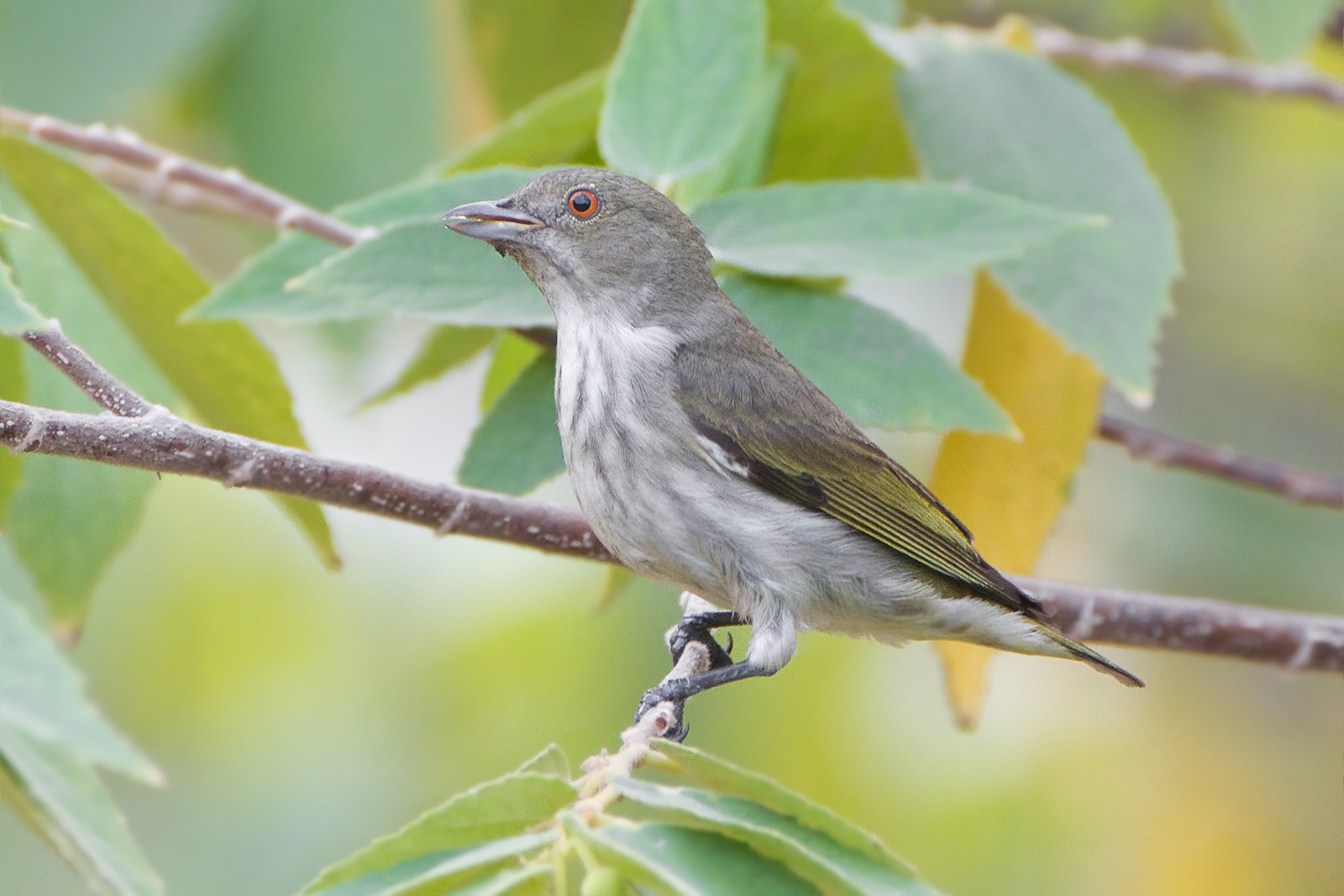
- Thick-billed flowerpecker (Pachyglossa agilis)

Scientific classification
- Kingdom: Animalia
- Phylum: Chordata
- Class: Aves
- Order: Passeriformes
- Family: Dicaeidae
- Genus: Pachyglossa; Blyth, 1843

Type species
- Pachyglossa melanozantha Yellow-bellied flowerpecker Blyth, 1843

= Pachyglossa (bird) =

Genus of birds

Pachyglossa is one of the three genera of flowerpeckers that make up the family Dicaeidae. These species are found in montane areas of South and Southeast Asia.

== Taxonomy ==
The genus Pachyglossa was introduced in 1843 by the English zoologist Edward Blyth with Pachyglossa melanoxantha, Blyth, (the yellow-bellied flowerpecker) as the type species. The genus name combines the Ancient Greek παχυς/pakhus meaning "thick" with γλωσσα/glōssa meaning "tongue", "mouth" (or "bill"). Molecular phylogenetic studies of the flowerpecker family found that the genus Dicaeum was paraphyletic with respect to Prionochilus. To resolve the paraphyly the genus Pachyglossa was resurrected to contain several species previously placed in Dicaeum as well as one species from Prionochilus, the olive-backed flowerpecker, for which the phylogeny is less certain.

The genus contains the following seven species:

Genus Pachyglossa – Blyth, 1843 – seven species
Common name	Scientific name and subspecies	Range	Size and ecology	IUCN status and estimated population
Olive-backed flowerpecker	Pachyglossa olivacea (Tweeddale, 1877) Three subspecies: P. o. parsonsi (McGregor, 1927) – Luzon group (north Philippines); P. o. olivacea (Tweeddale, 1877) – Mindanao group (south Philippines); P. o. samarensis (Steere, 1890) – East Visayas (central east Philippines)	Philippines (except Palawan group, Mindoro, West Visayas and Sulu Archipelago)	Size: Habitat: Diet:	LC
Whiskered flowerpecker	Pachyglossa propria (Ripley & Rabor, 1966)	Montane Mindanao (south Philippines)	Size: Habitat: Diet:	LC
Yellow-vented flowerpecker	Pachyglossa chrysorrhea (Temminck, 1829)	Himalayas to Borneo and Bali	Size: Habitat: Diet:	LC
Yellow-bellied flowerpecker	Pachyglossa melanozantha (Blyth, 1843)	Himalayas to Thailand	Size: Habitat: Diet:	LC
Legge's flowerpecker	Pachyglossa vincens (Sclater, PL, 1872)	Sri Lanka	Size: Habitat: Diet:	NT
Brown-backed flowerpecker	Pachyglossa everetti (Sharpe, 1877)	Malay Peninsula, Riau Islands (east of central Sumatra) and Borneo	Size: Habitat: Diet:	NT
Thick-billed flowerpecker	Pachyglossa agilis (Tickell, 1833) Eleven subspecies: P. a. agilis (Tickell, 1833) – northeast Pakistan and peninsular India; P. a. zeylonica (Whistler, 1944) – Sri Lanka; P. a. pallescens (Riley, 1935) – Bangladesh to Myanmar, north Thailand, and north Vietnam; P. a. modesta (Hume, 1875) – south peninsular Thailand, Malay Peninsula, and Borneo; P. a. atjehensis (Delacour, 1946) – Sumatra; P. a. finschi (Bartels, MEG, 1914) – Java (rare); P. a. tincta (Mayr, 1944) – Sumba and Flores to Alor Island (central Lesser Sunda Islands); P. a. obsoleta (Müller, S, 1843) – Timor and Wetar (east Lesser Sunda Islands); P. a. striatissima Parkes, 1962 – Luzon group (north Philippines); P. a. aeruginosa (Bourns & Worcester, 1894) – Mindoro, West Visayas and Mindanao (south Philippines); P. a. affinis (Zimmer, JT, 1919) – Palawan (southwest Philippines); The subspecies P. a. aeruginosa, P. a. striatissima and P. a. affinis have sometimes been considered as a separate species, the striped flowerpecker.	Widespread, also Lesser Sunda Islands	Size: Habitat: Diet:	LC

In common with the other flowerpeckers, the Pachyglossa flowerpeckers are small birds, between 9–11 cm (3.5–4.3 in) in length and weighing 9–11 g (0.32–0.39 oz). The bill of all the 7 species is deep, broad and short. In terms of plumage the genus is fairly variable.

Like all members of the family nectar and pollen of mistletoe (Loranthaceae) form an important part of their diet. In addition, other fruits are taken. Smaller fruits are consumed whole, or squeezed until skin is removed and discarded, then swallowed, whereas larger fruits are pierced with the bill and chunks removed and swallowed. Insects and spiders are also eaten.
