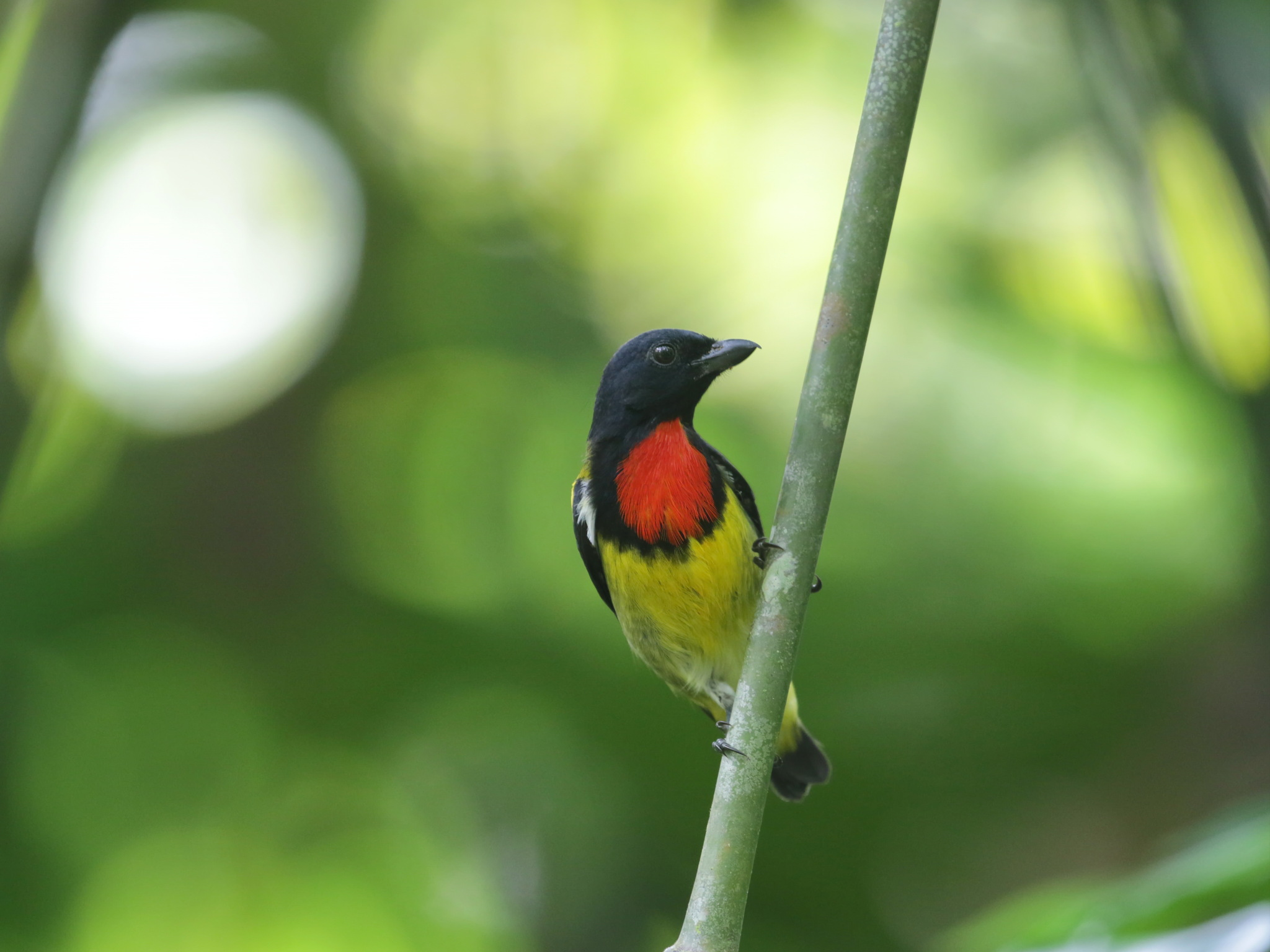

Conservation status
- Near Threatened (IUCN 3.1)

Scientific classification
- Kingdom: Animalia
- Phylum: Chordata
- Class: Aves
- Order: Passeriformes
- Family: Dicaeidae
- Genus: Prionochilus
- Species: P. thoracicus

Binomial name
- Prionochilus thoracicus (Temminck, 1836)

= Scarlet-breasted flowerpecker =

Species of bird

The scarlet-breasted flowerpecker (Prionochilus thoracicus) is a species of bird in the family Dicaeidae. It is found in Brunei, Indonesia, Malaysia, and Thailand. Its natural habitats are subtropical or tropical moist lowland forest and subtropical or tropical swamps. It is threatened by habitat loss.
