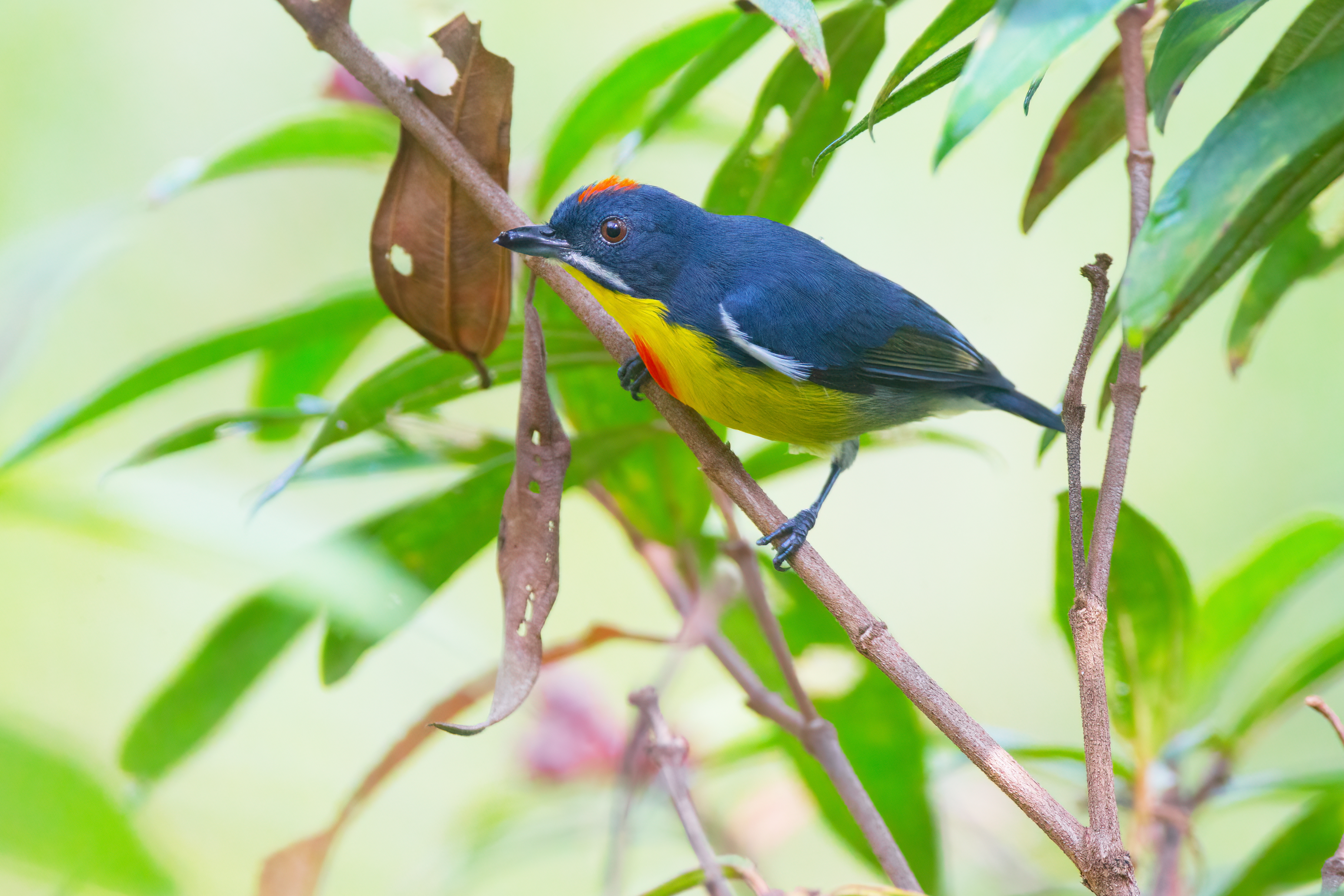

Conservation status
- Least Concern (IUCN 3.1)

Scientific classification
- Kingdom: Animalia
- Phylum: Chordata
- Class: Aves
- Order: Passeriformes
- Family: Dicaeidae
- Genus: Prionochilus
- Species: P. percussus

Binomial name
- Prionochilus percussus (Temminck, 1826)

= Crimson-breasted flowerpecker =

Species of bird

The crimson-breasted flowerpecker (Prionochilus percussus) is a bird species in the family Dicaeidae. It is found in Indonesia, Malaysia, Myanmar, and Thailand. Its natural habitats are subtropical or tropical moist lowland forest and subtropical or tropical mangrove forest.
