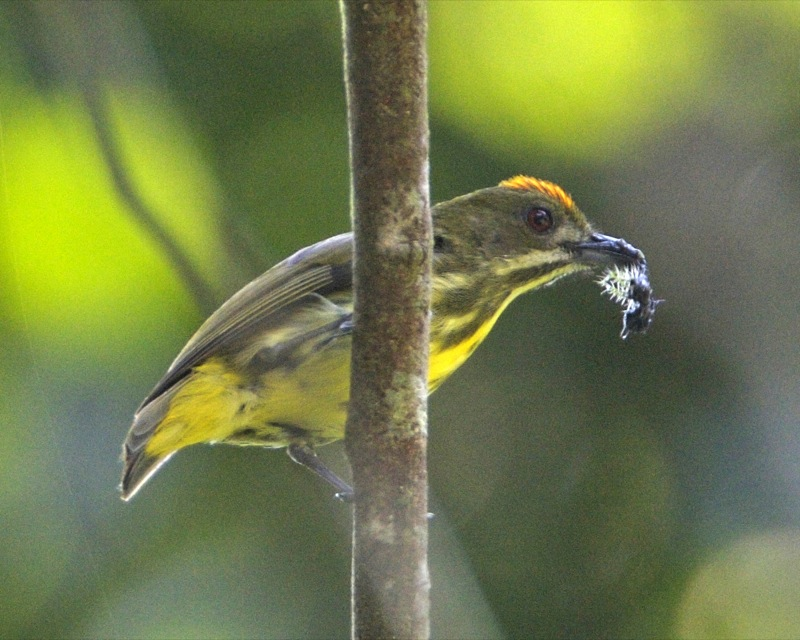
- In Panti Forest, Johor, Malaysia

Conservation status
- Least Concern (IUCN 3.1)

Scientific classification
- Kingdom: Animalia
- Phylum: Chordata
- Class: Aves
- Order: Passeriformes
- Family: Dicaeidae
- Genus: Prionochilus
- Species: P. maculatus

Binomial name
- Prionochilus maculatus (Temminck, 1836)

= Yellow-breasted flowerpecker =

Species of bird

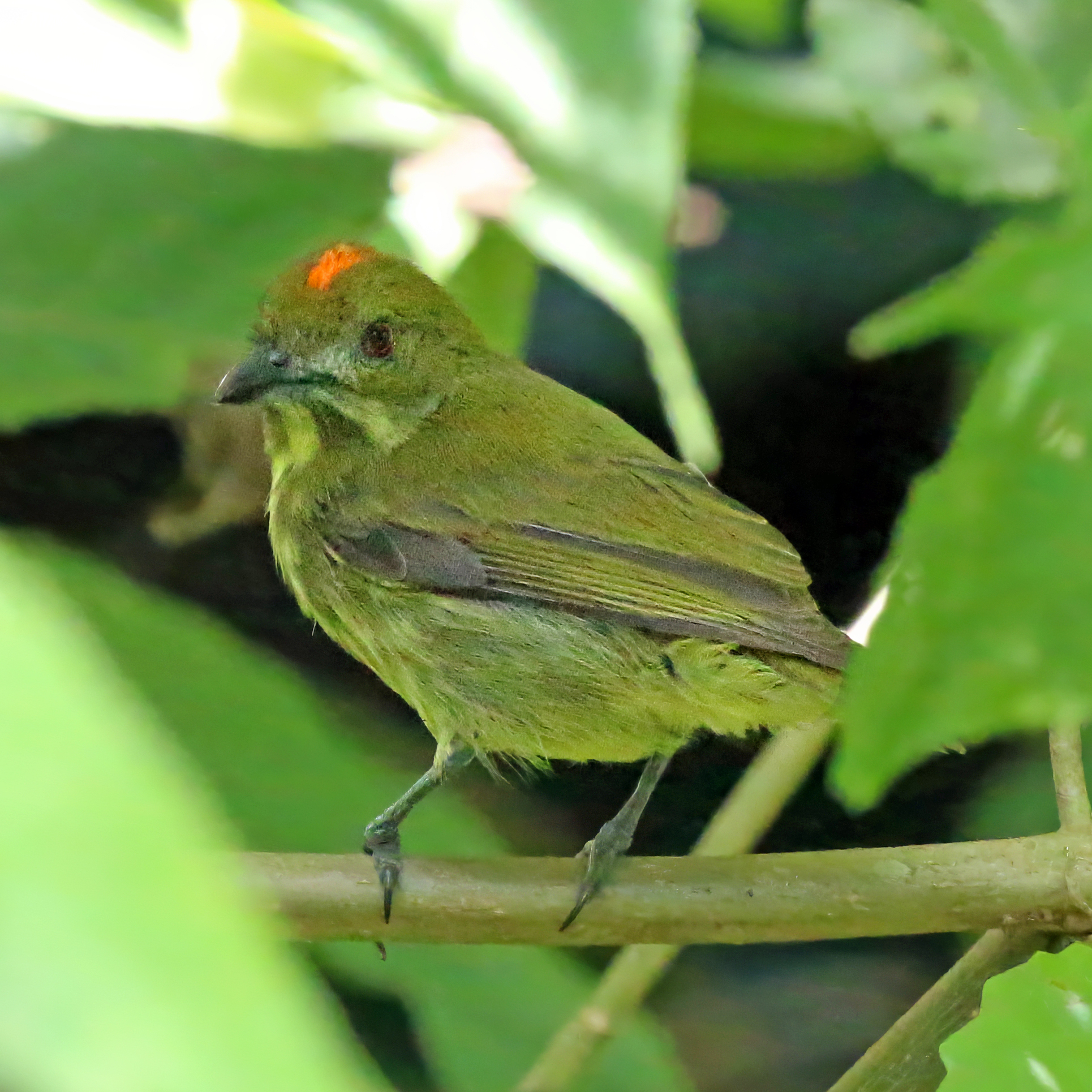
showing crown patch

The yellow-breasted flowerpecker (Prionochilus maculatus) is a species of bird in the family Dicaeidae. It is found in Brunei, Indonesia, Malaysia, Myanmar, Singapore, and Thailand. Its natural habitats are subtropical or tropical moist lowland forest and subtropical or tropical moist montane forest.

== Taxonomy ==
The scientific name of the yellow-breasted flowerpecker is Prionochilus maculatus. These birds are members of the Dicaeidae family. The yellow-breasted flowerpecker was assessed and classified in 1836 by Coenraad Jacob Temminck, a Dutch zoologist and museum director, and Jules Meiffren-Laugier de Chartrouse, a French scientist and politician.

=== Subspecies ===
Four subspecies are recognised:

- P. m. septentrionalis Robinson & Kloss, 1921 – north, central Malay Peninsula
- P. m. oblitus (Mayr, 1938) – south Malay Peninsula
- P. m. maculatus (Temminck, 1836) – Sumatra, Nias (west of north Sumatra), Belitung (east of Sumatra) and Borneo
- P. m. natunensis (Chasen, 1935) – Natuna Islands (northwest of Borneo)

== Description ==
The yellow-breasted flowerpecker has an olive green back, a bright neon orange patch on the top of its head, and a yellow underbelly with black streaks located on the sides. The iris is red, and the throat contains brushes of white. The legs are gray and anisodactyl. Both males and females of this species share a similar look with the female having slight differences in coloration. The male yellow-breasted flowerpecker ranges from 7.5 to 11.8 inches, while the female yellow-breasted flowerpecker ranges from 7.8 to 7.9 inches. The chirps of this bird are high pitched. The average lifespan of this bird is 2.4 years.

== Distribution and habitat ==
The yellow-breasted flowerpecker is found in the subtropical forest habitat. The yellow-breasted flowerpecker forages in the middle and upper levels of lowland and foothill forest and forest edge. This species presence has a broad range that expands across southern Asia. This bird is native to Brunei Darussalam, Indonesia, Malaysia, Myanmar, and Thailand. This species is now considered extinct in Singapore. The yellow-breasted flowerpecker is not a migrant bird and maintains residence in the terrestrial system.

== Behaviou and ecology ==
=== Food and feeding ===
The diet of the yellow-breasted flowerpecker contains mainly fruit, nectar, and pollen. Their diet includes:

Benjamin fig; Ficus villosa; Melastoma malabathricum; Straits rhododendron fruit; and Hairy Clidemia.

=== Breeding ===
The breeding of the yellow-breasted flowerpecker depends on the region and usually occurs in the summertime. The nascent birds are nurtured by their parents. The nest is made from fern rhizomes and tree cotton, reinforced by spider webs. The nest contains a triangular-shaped entrance hole pointing upwards and is surrounded by overhanging leaves. The yellow-breasted flowerpecker has a clutch of two eggs. The eggs are white and covered with brown spots and blotches around the end.

== Conservation status ==
The current population trend for the yellow-breasted flowerpecker is stable and is listed as a Least Concern on the IUCN Red List of Threatened Species. The yellow-breasted flowerpecker was last assessed by the IUCN on 1 October 2016. There are no restrictions or conservation efforts put in place to protect this bird. The yellow-breasted flowerpecker is considered near threatened in the Malay Peninsula due to potential habitat loss in the future.
