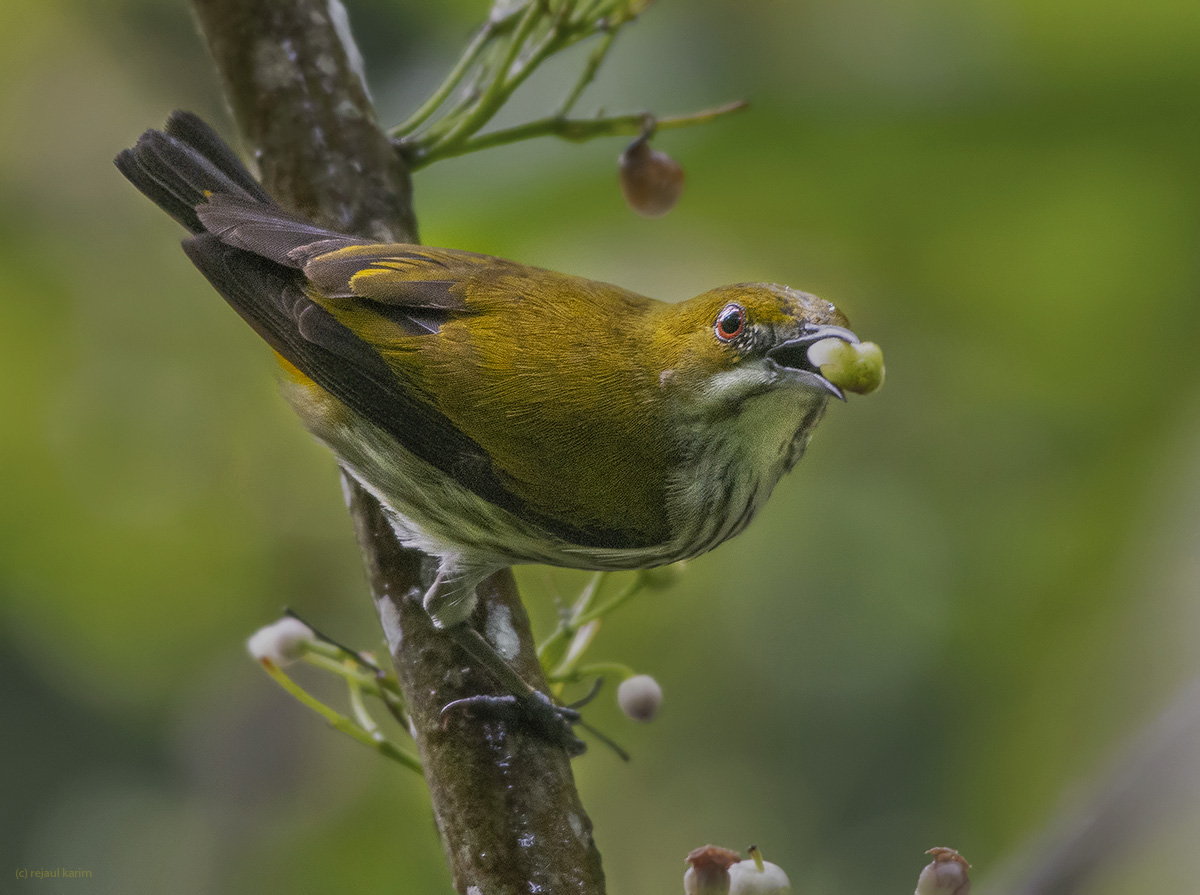
- Yellow-vented Flowerpecker in Guwahati, Assam, India

Conservation status
- Least Concern (IUCN 3.1)

Scientific classification
- Kingdom: Animalia
- Phylum: Chordata
- Class: Aves
- Order: Passeriformes
- Family: Dicaeidae
- Genus: Pachyglossa
- Species: P. chrysorrhea

Binomial name
- Pachyglossa chrysorrhea (Temminck, 1829)

Synonyms
- Dicaeum chrysorrheum

= Yellow-vented flowerpecker =

Species of bird in Asia

The yellow-vented flowerpecker (Pachyglossa chrysorrhea) is a species of bird in the family Dicaeidae. It is found in Bangladesh, Bhutan, Brunei, Cambodia, China, India, Indonesia, Laos, Malaysia, Myanmar, Nepal, Singapore, Thailand, and Vietnam. Its natural habitats are subtropical or tropical moist lowland forest and subtropical or tropical moist montane forest. While most species have vestigial outermost primary feathers, those of the yellow-vented flowerpecker are elongated. This species was formerly placed in the genus Dicaeum.
