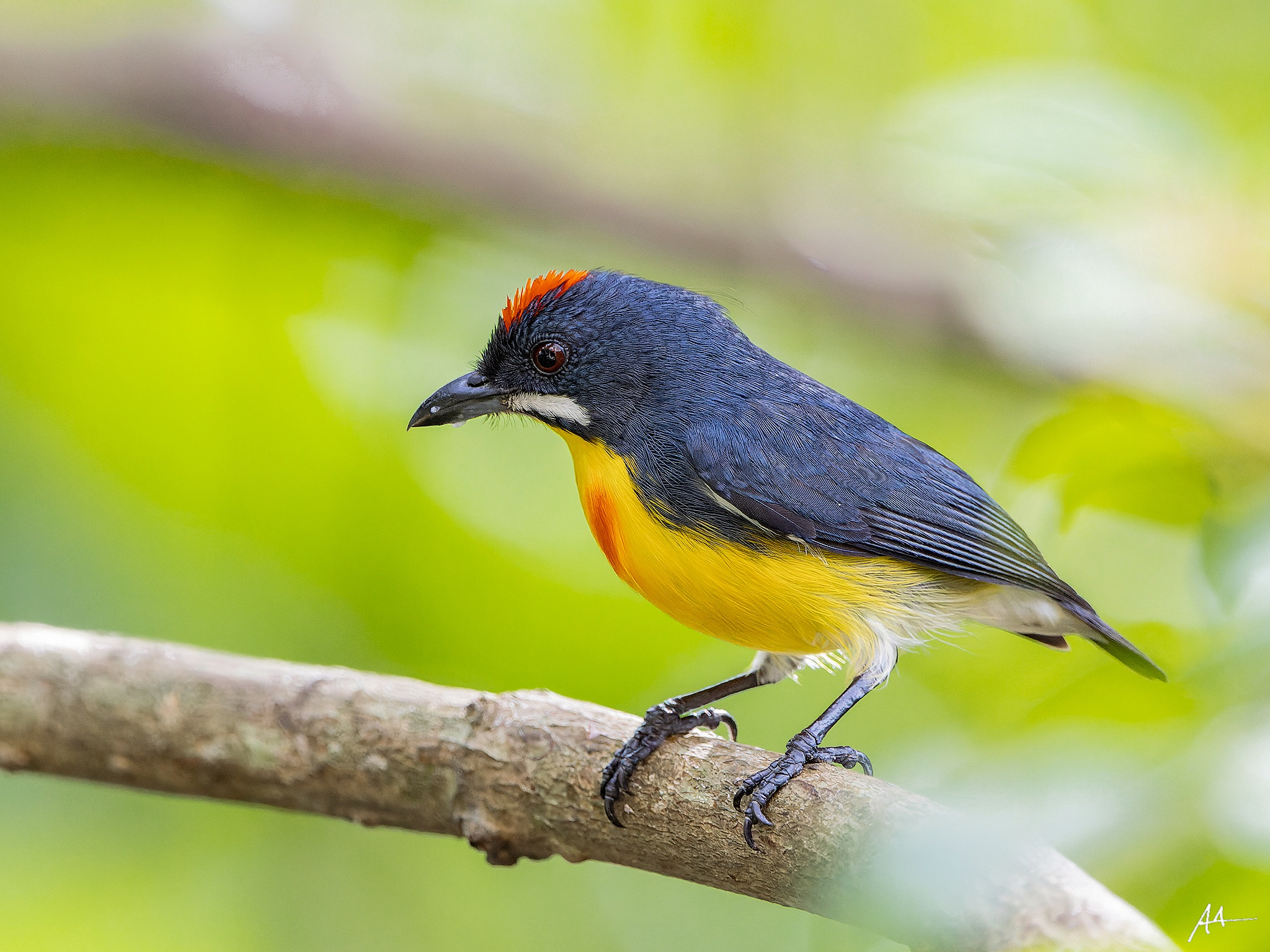
- Male
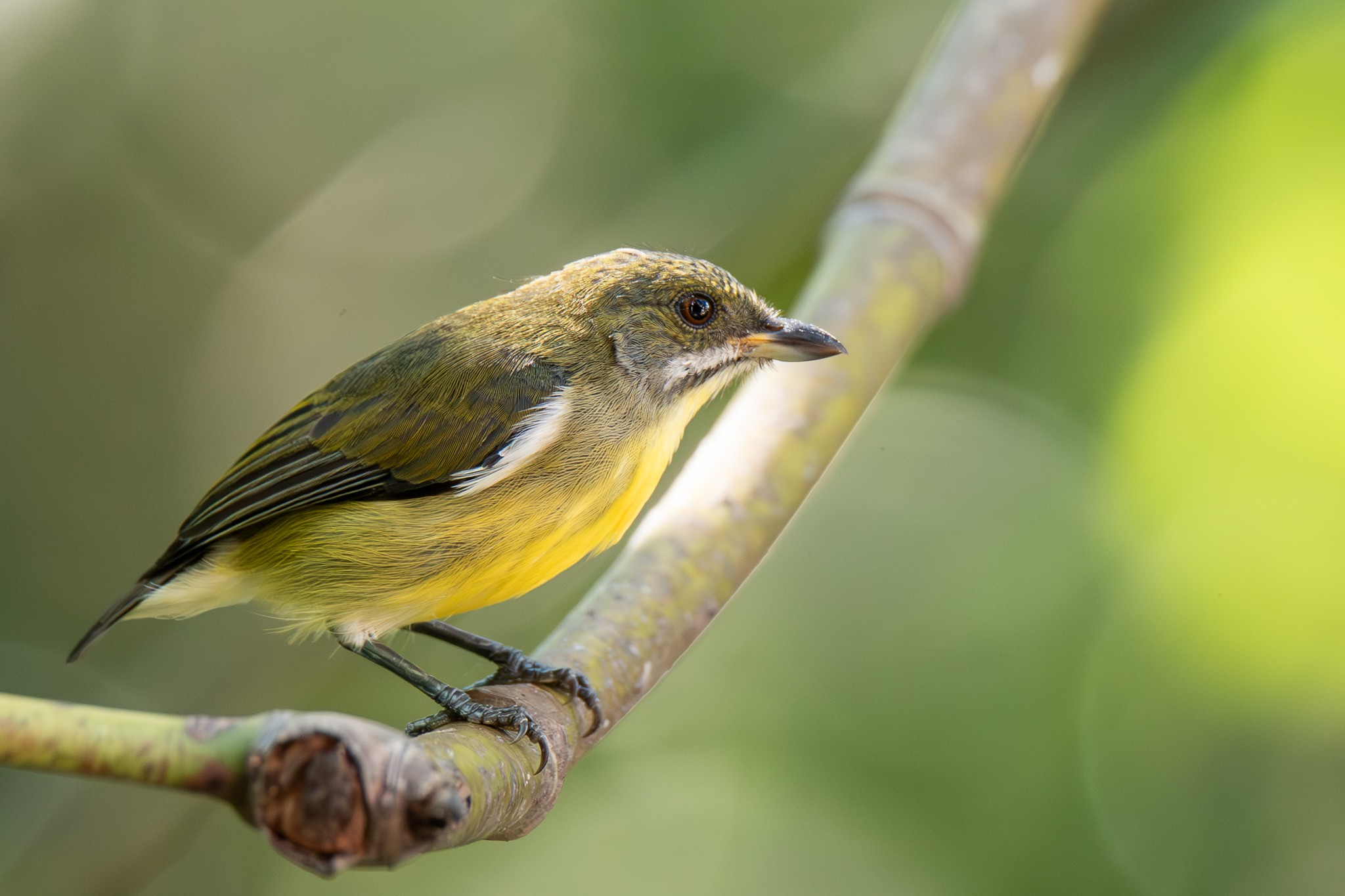
- Female

Conservation status
- Least Concern (IUCN 3.1)

Scientific classification
- Kingdom: Animalia
- Phylum: Chordata
- Class: Aves
- Order: Passeriformes
- Family: Dicaeidae
- Genus: Prionochilus
- Species: P. plateni

Binomial name
- Prionochilus plateni Blasius, 1888

= Palawan flowerpecker =

Species of bird

The Palawan flowerpecker (Prionochilus plateni) is a species of bird in the family Dicaeidae. It is endemic to the Philippines found only in the Palawan island group. Its natural habitat is tropical moist lowland forest.

== Description and taxonomy ==
The scientific name commemorates the German zoologist Carl Constantin Platen

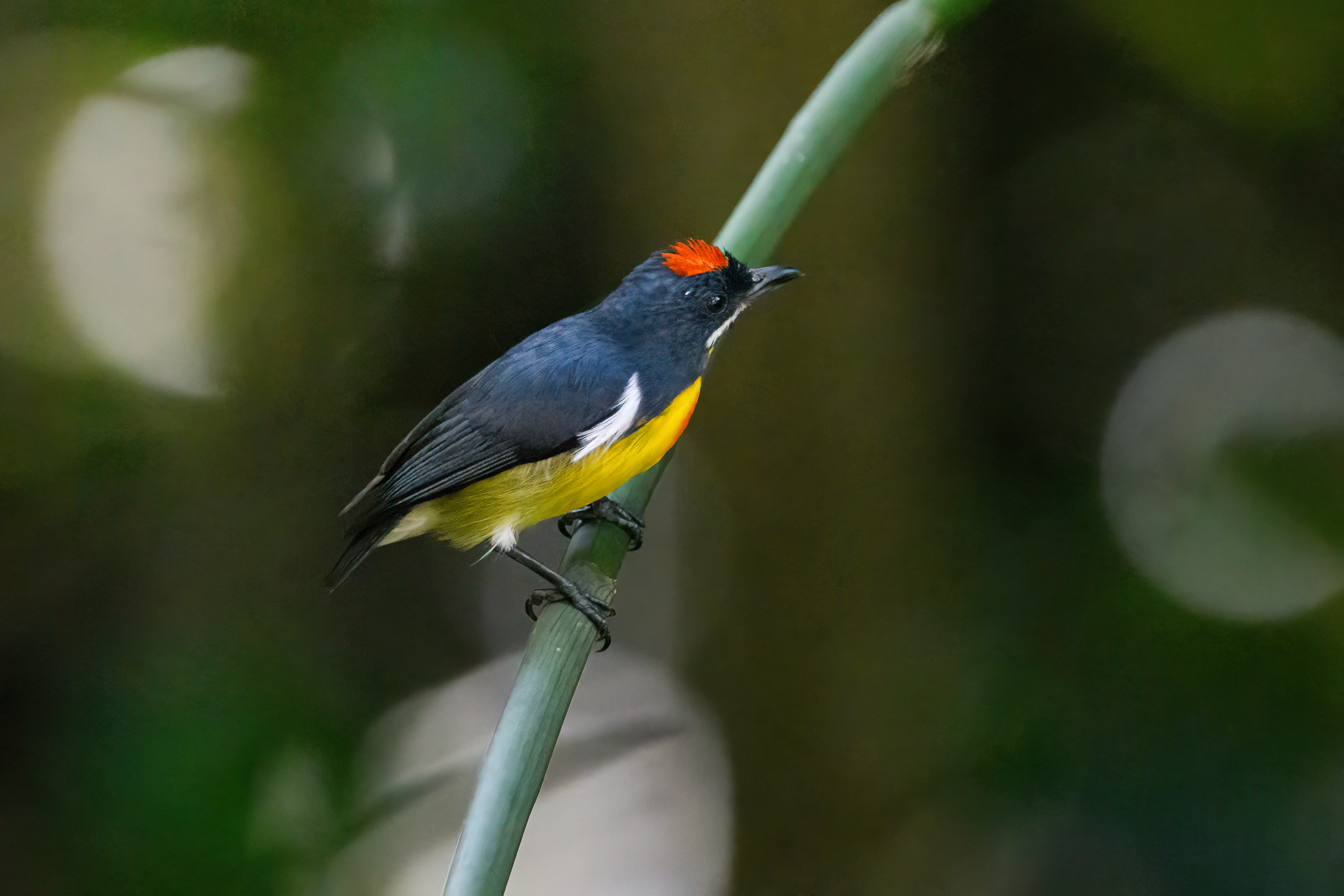
Palawan flowerpecker with its red crown patch

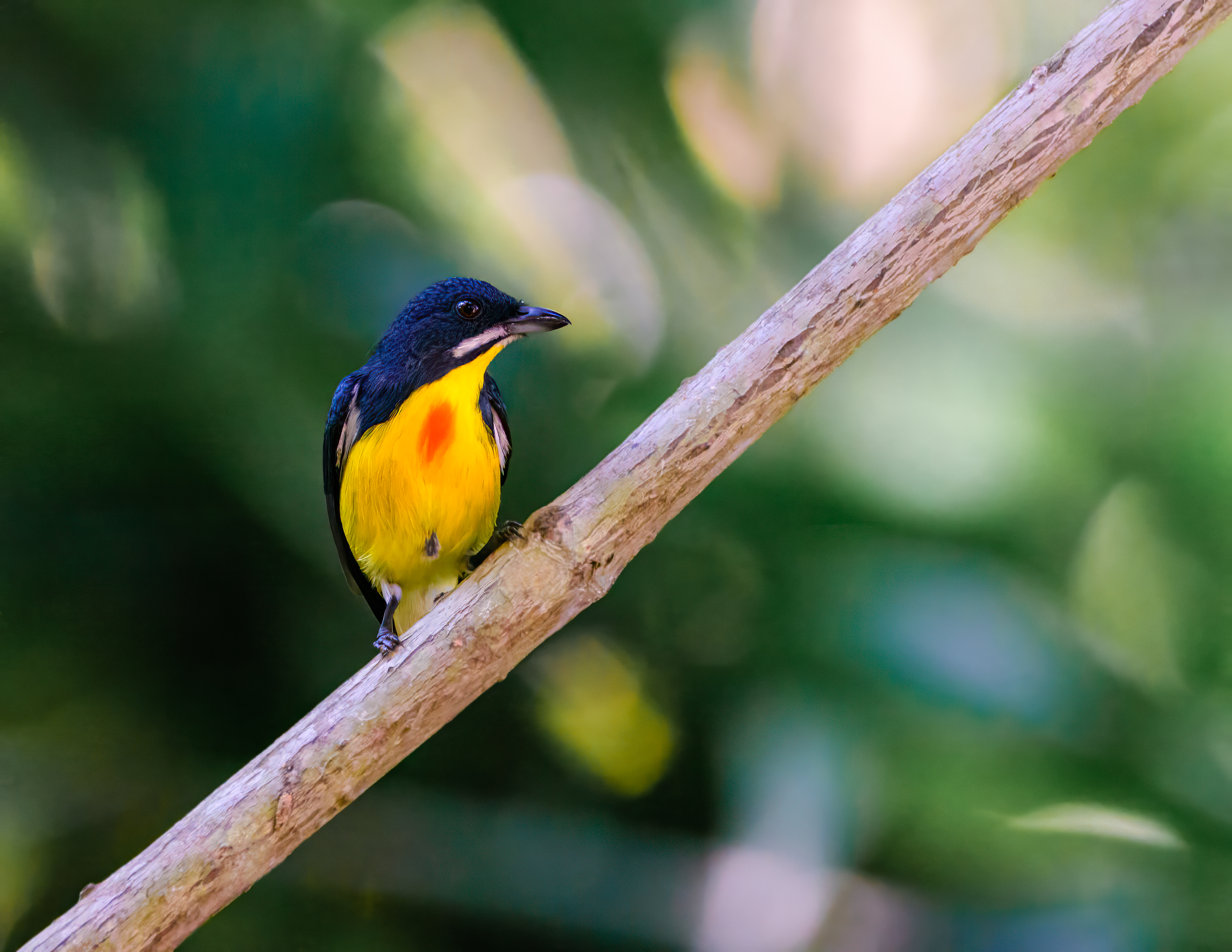
Palawan flowerpecker with its chest with a red smudge

=== Subspecies ===
Two subspecies are recognized:

- Prionochilus plateni plateni – Found on Palawan and Balabac
- Prionochilus plateni culionensis – Found on Culion Island group; male has orange-yellow rump, throat and breast to belly, female is deep yellow belly, with orange pectoral spot.

== Ecology and behavior ==
It is known to feed on fruit, nectar and pollen of mistletoes but otherwise its diet has not yet been studied. It occurs on all storeys of the forest and is typically found singly or in mixed-species flocks.

Specimens collected of birds in breeding condition have enlarged gonads from April to August. No other information is known about its mating, nesting and fledgling habits.

== Habitat and conservation status ==
The species inhabits tropical moist lowland primary forest and secondary forest.

It is assessed as least-concern under the IUCN with populations believed to be decreasing due to habitat loss and deforestation. The whole of Palawan was designated as a Biosphere Reserve; however, protection and enforcement of laws has been difficult and these threats still continue. It occurs in the protected area of Puerto Princesa Subterranean River National Park.
