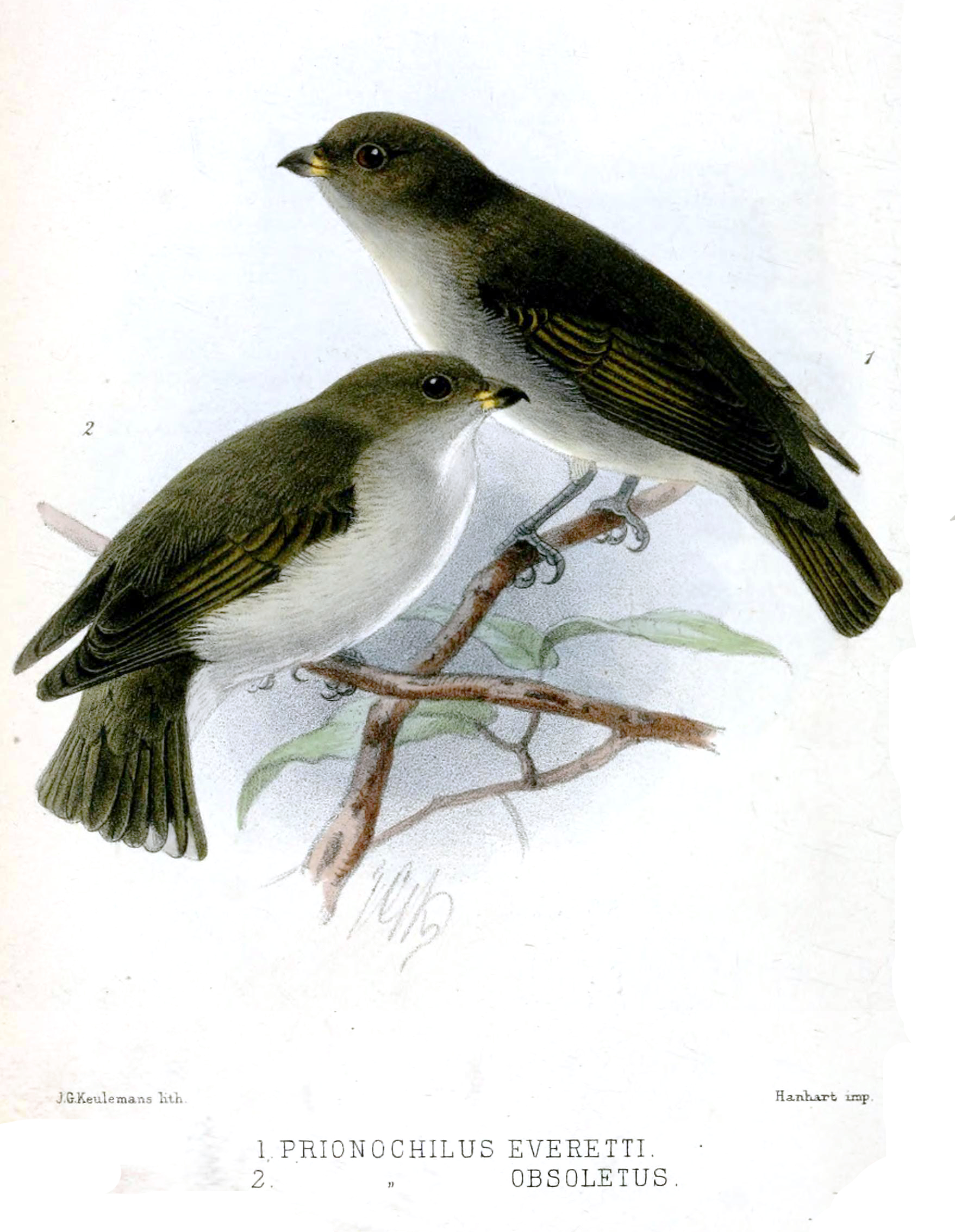
- Brown-backed flowerpecker on top

Conservation status
- Near Threatened (IUCN 3.1)

Scientific classification
- Kingdom: Animalia
- Phylum: Chordata
- Class: Aves
- Order: Passeriformes
- Family: Dicaeidae
- Genus: Pachyglossa
- Species: P. everetti

Binomial name
- Pachyglossa everetti (Sharpe, 1877)

Synonyms
- Dicaeum everetti

= Brown-backed flowerpecker =

Species of bird

The brown-backed flowerpecker (Pachyglossa everetti) is a species of passerine bird in the flowerpecker family Dicaeidae. The scientific name commemorates the British colonial administrator and zoological collector Alfred Hart Everett.

The species is monotypic: no subspecies are recognised.

== Distribution and habitat ==
It is found in Brunei, Indonesia, and Malaysia. Its natural habitats are subtropical or tropical moist lowland forest and subtropical or tropical mangrove forest. It is threatened by habitat loss.
