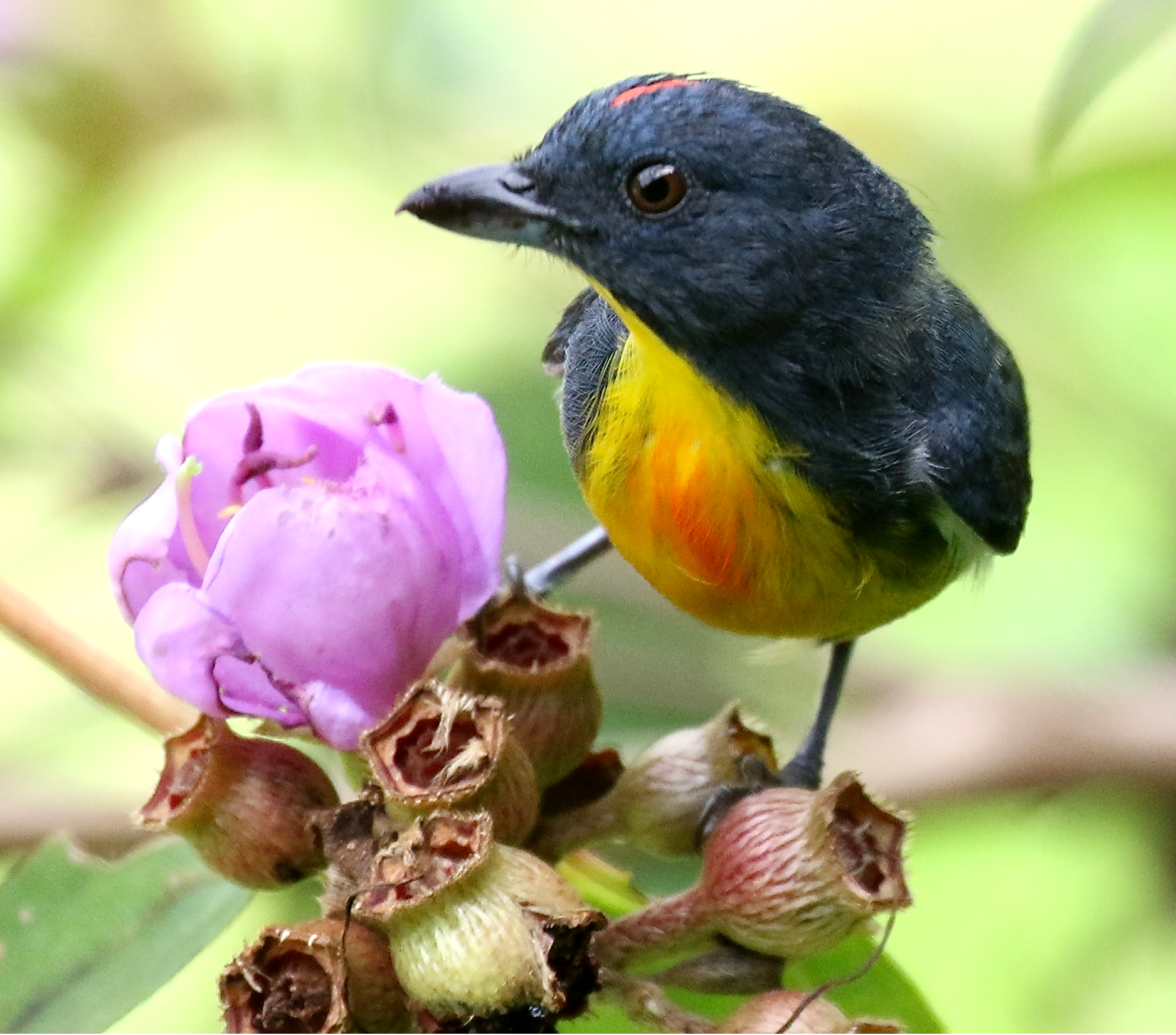

Conservation status
- Least Concern (IUCN 3.1)

Scientific classification
- Kingdom: Animalia
- Phylum: Chordata
- Class: Aves
- Order: Passeriformes
- Family: Dicaeidae
- Genus: Prionochilus
- Species: P. xanthopygius

Binomial name
- Prionochilus xanthopygius Salvadori, 1868

= Yellow-rumped flowerpecker =

Species of bird

The yellow-rumped flowerpecker (Prionochilus xanthopygius) is a species of bird in the family Dicaeidae. It is found in Brunei, Indonesia, and Malaysia on the island of Borneo, to which it is endemic. Its natural habitats are subtropical or tropical moist lowland forests and subtropical or tropical moist montane forests.

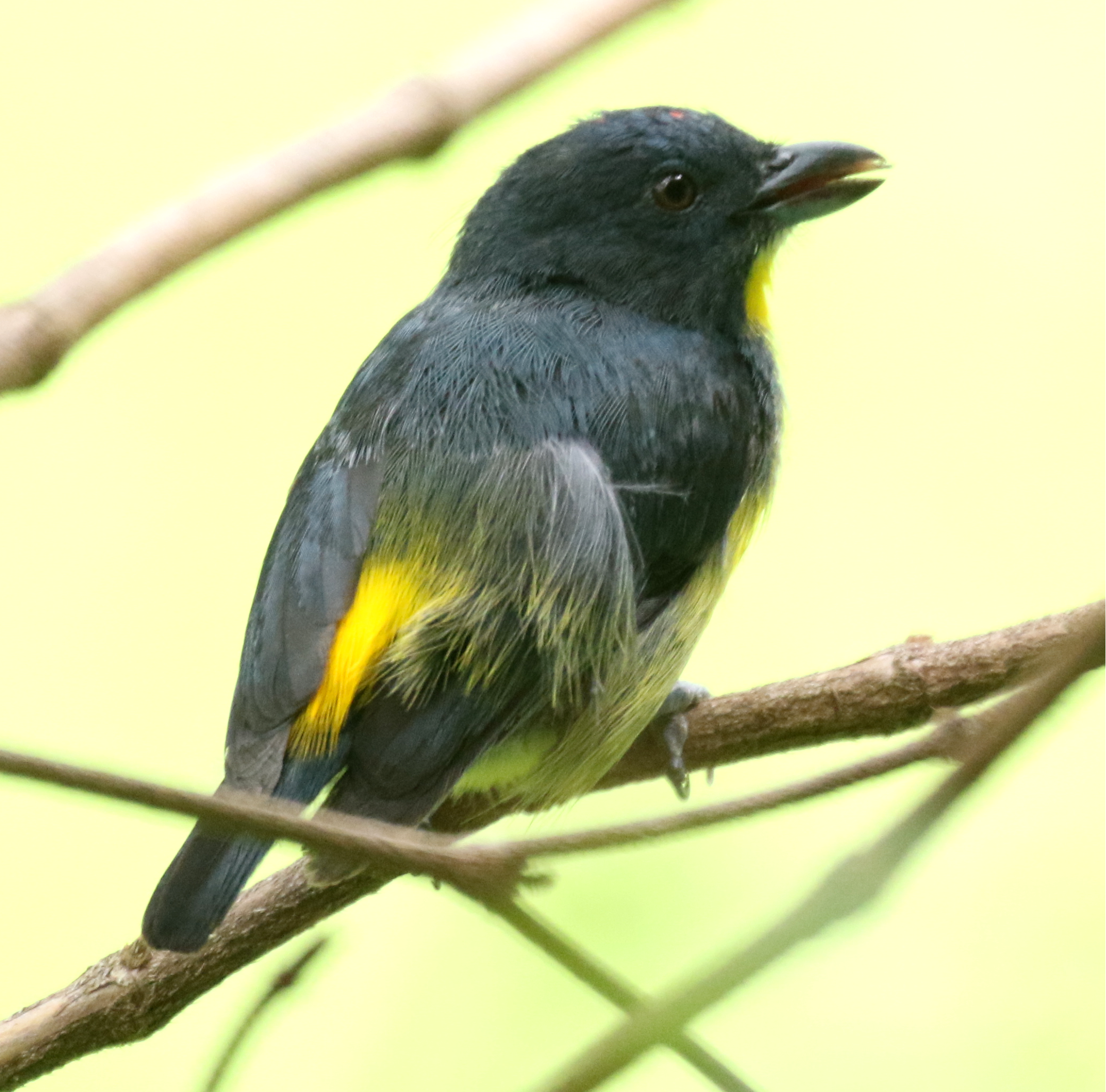
Borneo Rainforest Lodge, Danum Valley - Sabah, Borneo - Malaysia
