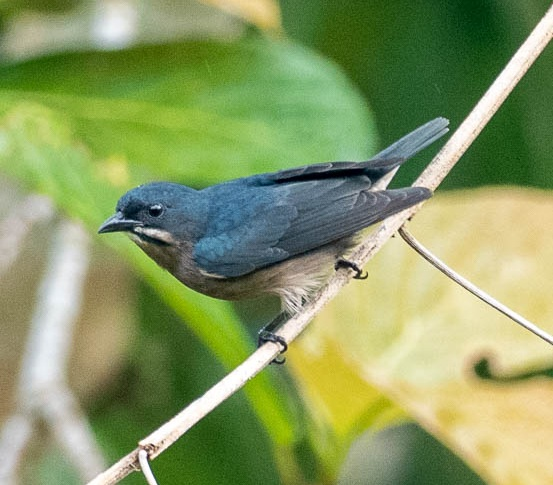

Conservation status
- Least Concern (IUCN 3.1)

Scientific classification
- Kingdom: Animalia
- Phylum: Chordata
- Class: Aves
- Order: Passeriformes
- Family: Dicaeidae
- Genus: Pachyglossa
- Species: P. propria

Binomial name
- Pachyglossa propria (Ripley & Rabor, 1966)

Synonyms
- Dicaeum proprium

= Whiskered flowerpecker =

Species of bird

The whiskered flowerpecker (Pachyglossa propria) is a species of bird in the family Dicaeidae. It is endemic to the island of Mindanao in the Philippines. Its natural habitat is tropical moist montane forest. It is becoming rare due to habitat loss. This species was formerly placed in the genus Dicaeum.

== Description and taxonomy ==
This species is monotypic and has no subspecies.

== Behaviour and ecology ==
Often seen feeding on fruiting and flowering trees where it feeds on fruit, nectar, and pollen. They are dependent on mistletoe flowers and are very site loyal

Almost nothing is known about its breeding habits except an observation of a bird carrying nesting material to the top of a 20 meter tree in late April to early May.

== Habitat and conservation status ==
It inhabits tropical moist primary and secondary sub-montane and montane forest and forest edge 1,000 masl where they are dependent on mistletoe flowers.

IUCN has assessed this bird as a least-concern species. It was formerly listed as a near-threatened species as it was rare but over time it was discovered that these birds were extremely site loyal to mistletoes.

Despite a limited range, it is said to be locally common in its range. As it occurs in rugged and inaccessible mountains, this has allowed a large portion of its habitat to remain intact. It is also able to tolerate degraded forest. However, the population is still said to be declining, it is still affected by habitat loss through deforestation, mining, land conversion and slash-and-burn - just not to the same extent as lowland forest.
