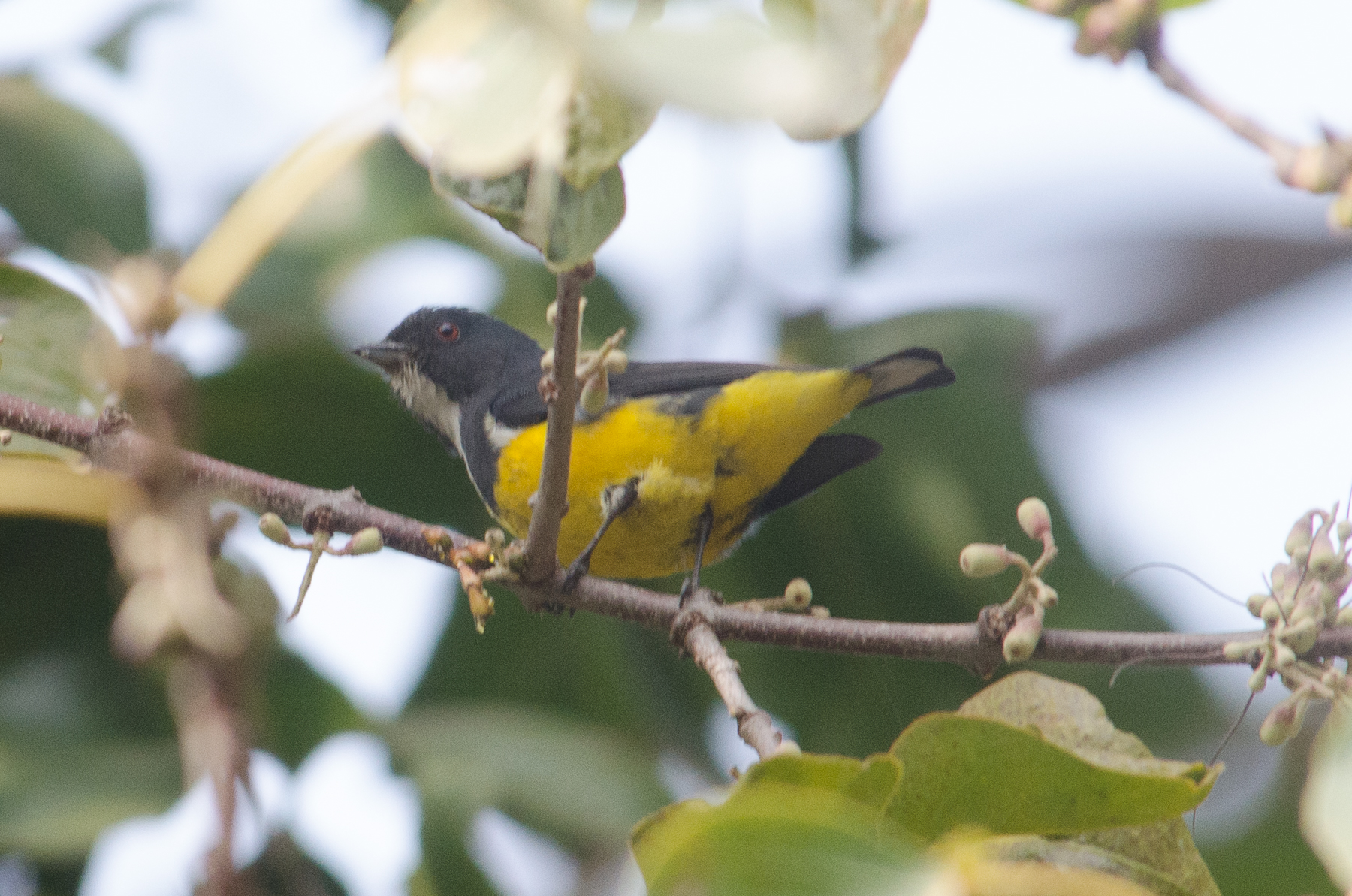

Conservation status
- Least Concern (IUCN 3.1)

Scientific classification
- Kingdom: Animalia
- Phylum: Chordata
- Class: Aves
- Order: Passeriformes
- Family: Dicaeidae
- Genus: Pachyglossa
- Species: P. melanozantha

Binomial name
- Pachyglossa melanozantha Blyth, 1843

Synonyms
- Dicaeum melanoxanthum Dicaeum melanozanthum

= Yellow-bellied flowerpecker =

Species of bird

The yellow-bellied flowerpecker (Pachyglossa melanozantha) is a species of bird in the flowerpecker family Dicaeidae. This species was formerly placed in the genus Dicaeum.

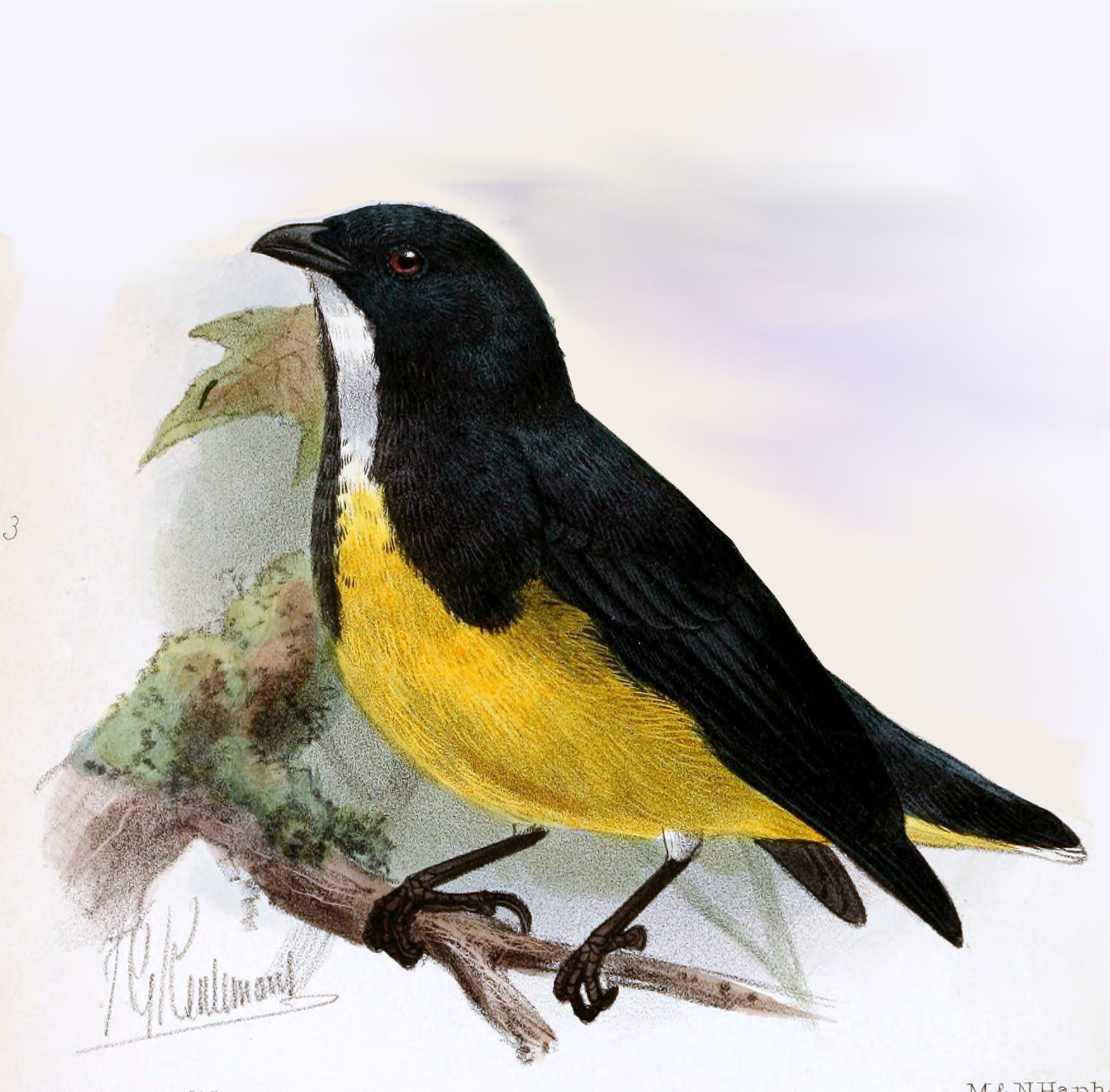

It is found in Bangladesh, Bhutan, China, India, Laos, Myanmar, Nepal, Thailand, and Vietnam. Its natural habitats are temperate forests and subtropical or tropical moist montane forests.
