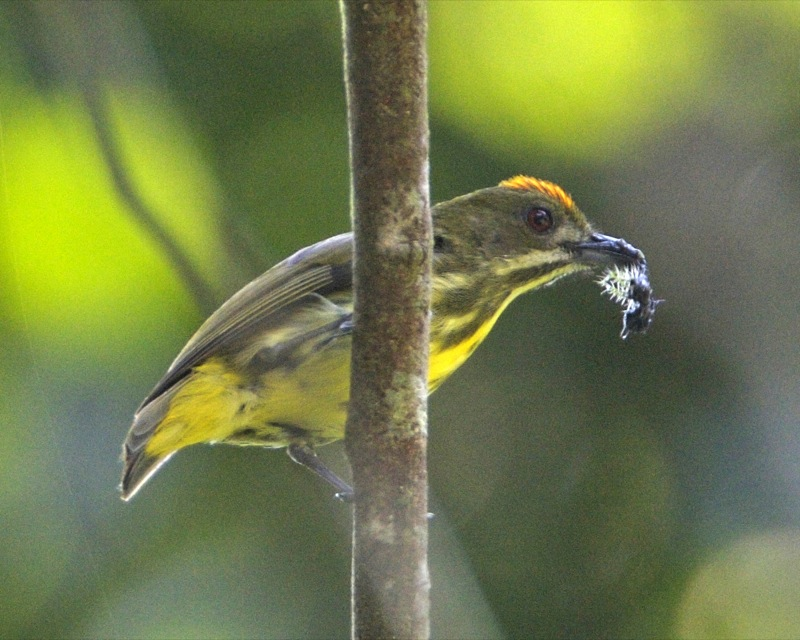
- Yellow-breasted flowerpecker (Prionochilus maculatus)

Scientific classification
- Kingdom: Animalia
- Phylum: Chordata
- Class: Aves
- Order: Passeriformes
- Family: Dicaeidae
- Genus: Prionochilus; Strickland, 1841

Type species
- Pardalotus percussus Crimson-breasted flowerpecker Temminck, 1826

= Prionochilus =

Genus of birds

Prionochilus is one of the three genera of flowerpeckers that make up the family Dicaeidae. The genus differs from the genus Dicaeum in having ten long primary feathers in the wing and in the character of its calls. A study comparing the calls of the two genera suggested that Prionochilus is basal to Dicaeum. The genus contains 5 species, in contrast to the 44 species in the genus Dicaeum. They have a more restricted distribution than Dicaeum, occurring in the Philippines, Borneo, Sumatra, Java and the Malay Peninsula.

== Taxonomy ==
The genus Prionochilus was introduced in 1841 by the English naturalist Hugh Edwin Strickland. The name is derived from the Ancient Greek prion for saw, and kheilos for lip, referring to the minute serrations along the edge of the bill. The type species was subsequently designated as Pardalotus percussus Temminck, 1826, the crimson-breasted flowerpecker.

The genus contains the following five species:

Image	Common name	Scientific name
	Yellow-breasted flowerpecker	Prionochilus maculatus
	Crimson-breasted flowerpecker	Prionochilus percussus
	Palawan flowerpecker	Prionochilus plateni
	Scarlet-breasted flowerpecker	Prionochilus thoracicus
	Yellow-rumped flowerpecker	Prionochilus xanthopygius

In common with the other flowerpeckers, the Prionochilus flowerpeckers are small birds, between 9–10 cm in length and weighing 7-23 g. The bill of all the five species is deep, broad and short. In terms of plumage the genus is fairly variable. Four of the five species exhibit sexual dimorphism with regards to plumage, with the males in these cases being more brightly coloured. In four of the five species at least one of the sexes have a white malar stripe on the throat, and all but one of the species has an orange or red patch on the crown.

Like all members of the family the fruits, nectar and pollen of mistletoe (Loranthaceae) are important to the Prionochilus flowerpeckers. In addition, other fruits are taken. Smaller fruits are consumed whole, or squeezed until skin is removed and discarded, then swallowed, whereas larger fruits are pierced with the bill and chunks removed and swallowed. In addition to plant material insects and spiders are eaten as well. Information about the diet (and many other aspects of the biology of this genus and indeed family) is patchy and more research is needed.
