= List of endemic birds of Indonesia =

Indonesia has more endemic birds than any other country. Indonesia's size, tropical climate, and archipelagic geography, support the world's second highest level of biodiversity (after Brazil).

Most endemic birds are in the Wallacea region of eastern Indonesia. Sulawesi supports twelve endemic bird genera. Of all Indonesian endemic birds, about sixty-one species are threatened: thirty-seven species are listed as vulnerable, twenty-three are endangered and eleven species are listed as critical on the IUCN Red List of Threatened Species.

== Conservation status ==
NE = not evaluated	NT = near threatened	CR = critical
DD = data deficient	VU = vulnerable	EW = extinct in the wild
LC = least concern	EN = endangered	EX = extinct

== Craciformes ==
=== Megapodiidae ===
- Aepypodius bruijnii (Bruijn's brush-turkey) - EN
- Talegalla cuvieri (red-billed brush-turkey) - LC
- Macrocephalon maleo (maleo) - EN
- Eulipoa wallacei (Moluccan scrubfowl) - VU
- Megapodius bernsteinii (Sula scrubfowl) - NT
- Megapodius tenimberensis (Tanimbar scrubfowl) - NE
- Megapodius geelvinkianus (Biak scrubfowl) - VU

== Galliformes ==
=== Phasianidae ===
- Anurophasis monorthonyx (Snow Mountain quail) - NT
- Arborophila orientalis (white-faced hill-partridge) - VU
- Arborophila javanica (chestnut-bellied partridge) - LC
- Arborophila rubrirostris (red-billed partridge) - LC
- Gallus varius (green junglefowl) - LC
- Lophura hoogerwerfi (Hoogerwerf's pheasant) - VU
- Lophura inornata (Salvadori's pheasant) - VU
- Polyplectron chalcurum (bronze-tailed peacock-pheasant) - LC

== Falconiformes ==
=== Falconidae ===
- Falco moluccensis (spotted kestrel) - LC

=== Accipitridae ===
- Spilornis rufipectus (Sulawesi serpent eagle) - LC
- Accipiter griseiceps (Sulawesi goshawk) - LC
- Accipiter trinotatus (spot-tailed goshawk) - LC
- Accipiter henicogrammus (Moluccan goshawk) - LC
- Accipiter nanus (small sparrowhawk) - NT
- Accipiter erythrauchen (rufous-necked sparrowhawk) - LC
- Accipiter rhodogaster (vinous-breasted sparrowhawk) - LC
- Nisaetus floris (Flores hawk-eagle) - EN
- Nisaetus bartelsi (Javan hawk-eagle) - EN
- Nisaetus lanceolatus (Sulawesi hawk-eagle) - LC

== Gruiformes ==
=== Rallidae ===
- Rallina leucospila (white-striped forest-rail) - NT
- Gallirallus sharpei (Sharpe's rail) - DD
- Gallirallus wallacii (invisible rail) - VU
- Aramidopsis plateni (snoring rail) - VU
- Gymnocrex rosenbergii (blue-faced rail) - VU
- Gymnocrex talaudensis (Talaud rail) - EN
- Amaurornis isabellinus (isabelline waterhen) - LC
- Amaurornis magnirostris (Talaud bush-hen) - NE

== Turniciformes ==
=== Turnicidae ===
- Turnix everetti (Sumba buttonquail) - VU

== Charadriiformes ==
=== Charadriidae ===
- Vanellus macropterus (Javanese lapwing) - CR
- Charadrius javanicus (Javan plover) - NT

=== Scolopacidae ===
- Scolopax saturata (Javan woodcock) - NT
- Scolopax celebensis (Sulawesi woodcock) - NT
- Scolopax rochussenii (Moluccan woodcock) - EN

== Columbiformes ==
=== Columbidae ===
- Turacoena manadensis (white-faced cuckoo-dove) - LC
- Geopelia maugeus (barred dove) - LC
- Gallicolumba tristigmata (Sulawesi ground dove) - LC
- Goura cristata (western crowned-pigeon) - VU
- Treron griseicauda (grey-cheeked green pigeon) - LC
- Treron floris (Flores green pigeon) - VU
- Treron teysmannii (Sumba green pigeon) - NT
- Treron oxyurus (Sumatran green pigeon) - NT
- Ptilinopus porphyreus (pink-headed fruit-dove) - LC
- Ptilinopus dohertyi (red-naped fruit-dove) - VU
- Ptilinopus fischeri (red-eared fruit-dove) - LC
- Ptilinopus subgularis (maroon-chinned fruit-dove) - NT
- Ptilinopus bernsteinii (scarlet-breasted fruit-dove) - LC
- Ptilinopus wallacii (Wallace's fruit-dove) - LC
- Ptilinopus monacha (blue-capped fruit-dove) - NT
- Ptilinopus hyogastrus (grey-headed fruit-dove) - LC
- Ptilinopus granulifrons (carunculated fruit-dove) - VU
- Ducula concinna (elegant imperial pigeon) - LC
- Ducula forsteni (white-bellied imperial pigeon) - LC
- Ducula radiata (grey-headed imperial pigeon) - LC
- Ducula perspicillata (spectacled imperial pigeon) - LC
- Ducula myristicivora (spice imperial pigeon) - LC
- Ducula basilica (cinnamon-bellied imperial pigeon) - LC
- Ducula lacernulata (dark-backed imperial pigeon) - LC
- Ducula luctuosa (silver-tipped imperial pigeon) - LC
- Cryptophaps poecilorrhoa (sombre pigeon) - LC
- Gymnophaps mada (Buru mountain pigeon) - LC

== Psittaciformes ==
=== Psittaculidae ===
- Loriculus stigmatus (Sulawesi hanging-parrot) - LC
- Loriculus amabilis (Moluccan hanging-parrot) - LC
- Loriculus sclateri (Sula hanging-parrot) - LC
- Loriculus catamene (Sangihe hanging-parrot) - EN
- Loriculus exilis (red-billed hanging-parrot) - NT
- Loriculus pusillus (yellow-throated hanging-parrot) - NT
- Loriculus flosculus (Flores hanging-parrot) - EN
- Micropsitta geelvinkiana (Geelvink pygmy-parrot) - NT
- Cacatua moluccensis (salmon-crested cockatoo) - VU
- Cacatua alba (white cockatoo) - VU
- Cacatua goffiniana (Tanimbar cockatoo) - NT
- Chalcopsitta atra (black lory) - LC
- Eos histrio (red-and-blue lory) - EN
- Eos squamata (violet-necked lory) - LC
- Eos bornea (red lory) - LC
- Eos reticulata (blue-streaked lory) - NT
- Eos cyanogenia (black-winged lory) - VU
- Eos semilarvata (blue-eared lory) - LC
- Trichoglossus ornatus (ornate lorikeet) - LC
- Saudareos meyeri (yellow-cheeked lorikeet) - LC
- Saudareos flavoviridis (Sula lorikeet) - LC
- Lorius garrulus (chattering lory) - EN
- Lorius domicella (purple-naped lory) - VU
- Charmosynopsis toxopei (blue-fronted lorikeet) - CR
- Prioniturus flavicans (yellowish-breasted racquet-tail) - NT
- Prioniturus platurus (golden-mantled racquet-tail) - LC
- Prioniturus mada (Buru racquet-tail) - LC
- Tanygnathus gramineus (black-lored parrot) - VU
- Tanygnathus megalorynchos (great-billed parrot ) - LC
- Alisterus amboinensis (Moluccan king-parrot) - LC
- Psittaculirostris salvadorii (Salvadori's fig-parrot) - VU

== Cuculiformes ==
=== Cuculidae ===
- Cuculus crassirostris (Sulawesi hawk-cuckoo) - LC
- Cacomantis aeruginosus (Moluccan cuckoo) - NT
- Chrysococcyx crassirostris (pied bronze-cuckoo) - LC
- Eudynamys melanorhynchus (black-billed koel) - LC
- Phaenicophaeus calyorhynchus (yellow-billed malkoha) - LC
- Carpococcyx viridis (Sumatran ground cuckoo) - CR
- Centropus goliath (Goliath coucal) - LC
- Centropus spilopterus (Kai coucal) - LC
- Centropus chalybeus (Biak coucal) - NT
- Centropus nigrorufus (Sunda coucal) - VU
- Centropus celebensis (bay coucal) - LC

== Strigiformes ==
=== Tytonidae ===
- Tyto inexspectata (Sulawesi golden owl) - VU
- Tyto almae (Seram masked owl) - NE
- Tyto nigrobrunnea (Taliabu masked owl) - EN
- Tyto sororcula (Moluccan masked owl) - DD
- Tyto rosenbergii (Sulawesi owl) - LC

=== Strigidae ===
- Otus umbra (Simeulue scops-owl) - NT
- Otus angelinae (Javan scops-owl) - VU
- Otus manadensis (Sulawesi scops-owl) - LC
- Otus collari (Sangihe scops-owl) - LC
- Otus alfredi (Flores scops-owl) - EN
- Otus siaoensis (Siau scops-owl) - CR
- Otus enganensis (Enggano scops-owl) - NT
- Otus beccarii (Biak scops-owl) - EN
- Otus mentawi (Mentawai scops-owl) - NT
- Otus silvicola (Wallace's scops-owl) - LC
- Glaucidium castanopterum (Javan owlet) - LC
- Ninox rudolfi (Sumba boobook) - NT
- Ninox sumbaensis (least boobook) - NT
- Ninox ios (cinnabar boobook) - VU
- Ninox ochracea (ochre-bellied boobook) - NT
- Ninox burhani (Togian boobook) - NE
- Ninox punctulata (speckled boobook) - LC

== Caprimulgiformes ==
=== Caprimulgidae ===
- Eurostopodus diabolicus (Satanic nightjar) - VU
- Caprimulgus celebensis (Sulawesi nightjar) - LC
- Caprimulgus meesi (Mees's nightjar ) - LC
- Caprimulgus pulchellus (Salvadori's nightjar) - NT

=== Aegothelidae ===
- Aegotheles crinifrons (long-whiskered owlet-nightjar) - LC
- Aegotheles affinis (Vogelkop owlet-nightjar) - DD

== Apodiformes ==
=== Apodidae ===
- Collocalia infuscata (Moluccan swiftlet) - LC
- Collocalia vulcanorum (volcano swiftlet) - NT

== Trogoniformes ==
=== Trogonidae ===
- Apalharpactes reinwardtii (Javan trogon) - EN
- Apalharpactes mackloti (Sumatran trogon) - LC

== Coraciiformes ==
=== Coraciidae ===
- Coracias temminckii (purple-winged roller) - LC
- Eurystomus azureus (purple dollarbird) - VU

=== Alcedinidae ===
- Actenoides monachus (green-backed kingfisher) - NT
- Actenoides princeps (scaly kingfisher) - LC
- Tanysiptera ellioti (Kofiau paradise-kingfisher) - DD
- Tanysiptera riedelii (Biak paradise-kingfisher) - NT
- Tanysiptera carolinae (Numfor paradise-kingfisher) - NT
- Cittura cyanotis (lilac-cheeked kingfisher) - NT
- Caridonax fulgidus (white-rumped kingfisher) - LC
- Pelargopsis melanorhyncha (black-billed kingfisher) - LC
- Halcyon cyanoventris (Javan kingfisher) - LC
- Todirhamphus diops (blue-and-white kingfisher) - LC
- Todirhamphus lazuli (lazuli kingfisher) - NT
- Todirhamphus funebris (sombre kingfisher) - VU
- Todirhamphus enigma (Talaud kingfisher) - NT
- Ceyx fallax (Sulawesi kingfisher) - NT
- Alcedo coerulescens (small blue kingfisher) - LC
- Actenoides capucinus (black-headed kingfisher) - CR

=== Meropidae ===
- Meropogon forsteni (purple-bearded bee-eater) - LC

== Bucerotiformes ==
=== Bucerotidae ===
- Penelopides exarhatus (Sulawesi hornbill) - LC
- Aceros cassidix (knobbed hornbill) - LC
- Aceros everetti (Sumba hornbill) - VU

== Piciformes ==
=== Ramphastidae ===
- Megalaima corvina (brown-throated barbet) - LC
- Megalaima javensis (black-banded barbet) - NT
- Megalaima armillaris (flame-fronted barbet) - LC

=== Picidae ===
- Dendrocopos temminckii (Sulawesi pygmy woodpecker) - LC
- Mulleripicus fulvus (ashy woodpecker) - LC

== Passeriformes ==
=== Pittidae ===
- Pitta schneideri (Schneider's pitta) - VU
- Pitta maxima (ivory-breasted pitta) - LC
- Pitta dohertyi (Sula pitta) - NT
- Pitta venusta (graceful pitta) - VU
- Pitta elegans (elegant pitta) - LC

=== Ptilonorhynchidae ===
- Amblyornis inornata (Vogelkop bowerbird) - LC
- Amblyornis flavifrons (golden-fronted bowerbird) - LC

=== Meliphagidae ===
- Oreornis chrysogenys (orange-cheeked honeyeater) - LC
- Melitograis gilolensis (white-streaked friarbird) - LC
- Philemon brassi (Brass's friarbird) - NT
- Philemon fuscicapillus (dusky friarbird) - VU
- Philemon moluccensis (black-faced friarbird) - LC
- Philemon subcorniculatus (grey-necked friarbird) - LC
- Melipotes gymnops (Arfak honeyeater) - LC
- Melidectes leucostephes (Vogelkop melidectes) - LC
- Ptiloprora erythropleura (rufous-sided honeyeater) - LC
- Myza celebensis (dark-eared myza) - LC
- Myza sarasinorum (white-eared myza) - LC
- Lichmera lombokia (scaly-crowned honeyeater) - LC
- Lichmera argentauris (olive honeyeater) - LC
- Lichmera limbata (Indonesian honeyeater) - LC
- Lichmera squamata (white-tufted honeyeater) - LC
- Lichmera deningeri (Buru honeyeater) - LC
- Lichmera monticola (Seram honeyeater) - LC
- Lichmera notabilis (black-chested honeyeater) - LC
- Myzomela blasii (drab myzomela) - LC
- Myzomela kuehni (Wetar myzomela) - NT
- Myzomela dammermani (Sumba myzomela) - LC
- Myzomela chloroptera (Sulawesi myzomela) - LC
- Myzomela wakoloensis (Wakolo myzomela) - LC
- Myzomela boiei (Banda myzomela) - LC

=== Acanthizidae ===
- Sericornis rufescens (Vogelkop scrubwren) - LC
- Gerygone hypoxantha (Biak gerygone) - EN
- Gerygone dorsalis (rufous-sided gerygone) - LC

=== Artamidae ===
- Artamus monachus (ivory-backed woodswallow) - LC

=== Campephagidae ===
- Coracina schistacea (slaty cuckooshrike) - LC
- Coracina personata (Wallacean cuckooshrike) - LC
- Coracina atriceps (Moluccan cuckooshrike) - LC
- Coracina fortis (Buru cuckooshrike) - NT
- Coracina temminckii (cerulean cuckooshrike) - LC
- Coracina bicolor (pied cuckooshrike) - NT
- Coracina leucopygia (white-rumped cuckooshrike) - LC
- Coracina parvula (Halmahera cuckooshrike) - LC
- Coracina abbotti (pygmy cuckooshrike) - LC
- Coracina dohertyi (Sumba cicadabird) - LC
- Coracina sula (Sula cicadabird) - LC
- Coracina dispar (Kai cicadabird) - NT
- Coracina morio (Sulawesi cicadabird) - LC
- Coracina ceramensis (pale cicadabird) - LC
- Lalage leucopygialis (white-rumped triller) - LC
- Lalage sueurii (white-shouldered triller) - LC
- Lalage aurea (rufous-bellied triller) - LC
- Lalage moesta (white-browed triller) - LC
- Pericrocotus lansbergei (Flores minivet) - LC
- Pericrocotus miniatus (Sunda minivet) - LC

=== Pachycephalidae ===
- Hylocitrea bonensis (olive-flanked whistler) - LC
- Coracornis raveni (maroon-backed whistler) - LC
- Coracornis sanghirensis (Sangihe shrikethrush) - CR
- Pachycephala phaionota (island whistler) - LC
- Pachycephala sulfuriventer (sulphur-bellied whistler) - LC
- Pachycephala meyeri (Vogelkop whistler) - LC
- Pachycephala nudigula (bare-throated whistler) - LC
- Pachycephala mentalis (black-chinned whistler) - NE
- Pachycephala fulvotincta (rusty-breasted whistler) - NE
- Pachycephala griseonota (drab whistler) - LC
- Pachycephala arctitorquis (Wallacean whistler) - LC

=== Oriolidae ===
- Sphecotheres hypoleucus (Wetar figbird) - NT
- Oriolus bouroensis (black-eared oriole) - LC
- Oriolus forsteni (grey-collared oriole) - LC
- Oriolus phaeochromus (dusky-brown oriole) - LC
- Pitohui cerviniventris (Raja Ampat pitohui) - LC

=== Dicruridae ===
- Dicrurus sumatranus (Sumatran drongo) - NT
- Dicrurus montanus (Sulawesi drongo) - LC
- Dicrurus densus (Wallacean drongo) - LC

=== Rhipiduridae ===
- Eutrichomyias rowleyi (cerulean flycatcher) - CR
- Rhipidura phoenicura (rufous-tailed fantail) - LC
- Rhipidura euryura (white-bellied fantail) - LC
- Rhipidura diluta (brown-capped fantail) - LC
- Rhipidura fuscorufa (cinnamon-tailed fantail) - NT
- Rhipidura teysmanni (Sulawesi fantail) - LC
- Rhipidura sulaensis (Taliabu fantail)
- Rhipidura superflua (tawny-backed fantail) - LC
- Rhipidura dedemi (streaky-breasted fantail) - LC
- Rhipidura opistherythra (long-tailed fantail) - NT

=== Monarchidae ===
- Monarcha pileatus (white-naped monarch) - LC
- Monarcha castus (Loetoe monarch) - LC
- Monarcha mundus (black-bibbed monarch) - LC
- Monarcha sacerdotum (Flores monarch) - EN
- Monarcha everetti (white-tipped monarch) - EN
- Monarcha loricatus (black-tipped monarch) - LC
- Monarcha boanensis (black-chinned monarch) - CR
- Monarcha leucurus (white-tailed monarch) - NT
- Monarcha julianae (black-backed monarch) - DD
- Monarcha brehmii (Biak monarch) - EN
- Myiagra atra (Biak flycatcher) - NT
- Myiagra galeata (dark-grey flycatcher) - LC

=== Corvidae ===
- Corvus typicus (piping crow) - LC
- Corvus unicolor (Banggai crow) - CR
- Corvus florensis (Flores crow) - EN
- Corvus validus (long-billed crow) - LC
- Corvus fuscicapillus (brown-headed crow) - NT

=== Paradisaeidae ===
- Cicinnurus regius (King Bird-of-Paradise)
- Paradisaea apoda (Greater Bird-of-Paradise)
- Paradisaea minor (Lesser Bird-of-Paradise)
- Cicinnurus magnificus (Magnificent Bird-of-Paradise)
- Lycocorax pyrrhopterus (Halmahera paradise-crow) - LC
- Lycocorax obiensis (Obi paradise-crow) - LC
- Paradigalla carunculata (long-tailed paradigalla) - NT
- Astrapia nigra (Arfak astrapia) - LC
- Parotia berlepschi (bronze parotia) - LC
- Parotia sefilata (western parotia) - LC
- Cicinnurus respublica (Wilson's bird-of-paradise) - NT
- Semioptera wallacii (Wallace's standardwing) - LC
- Paradisaea rubra (red bird-of-paradise) - NT
- Lophorina niedda (Vogelkop superb bird-of-paradise)

=== Petroicidae ===
- Peneothello cryptoleuca (smoky robin) - LC
- Microeca hemixantha (golden-bellied flyrobin) - NT
- Petroica archboldi (Snow Mountain robin) - DD

=== Aegithalidae ===
- Psaltria exilis (pygmy tit) - LC

=== Cisticolidae ===
- Prinia familiaris (bar-winged prinia) - LC

=== Pycnonotidae ===
- Pycnonotus leucogrammicus (cream-striped bulbul) - LC
- Pycnonotus tympanistrigus (spot-necked bulbul) - NT
- Pycnonotus bimaculatus (orange-spotted bulbul) - LC
- Pycnonotus snouckaerti (Aceh bulbul) - NR
- Alophoixus affinis (Seram golden bulbul) - LC
- Hypsipetes virescens (green-winged bulbul) - LC

=== Cettiidae ===
- Tesia superciliaris (Javan tesia) - LC
- Tesia everetti (russet-capped tesia) - LC
- Cettia carolinae (Tanimbar bush warbler) - NT

=== Locustellidae ===
- Locustella montis (Javan bush warbler) - LC

=== Phylloscopidae ===
- Phylloscopus sarasinorum (Sulawesi leaf warbler) - LC
- Phylloscopus grammiceps (Sunda warbler) - LC

=== Leiothrichidae ===
- Garrulax rufifrons (rufous-fronted laughingthrush) - NT
- Crocias albonotatus (spotted crocias) - NT

=== Pellorneidae ===
- Trichastoma celebense (Sulawesi babbler) - LC
- Trichastoma buettikoferi (Sumatran babbler) - NT
- Malacocincla perspicillata (black-browed babbler) - VU
- Napothera rufipectus (rusty-breasted wren-babbler) - LC
- Alcippe pyrrhoptera (Javan fulvetta) - LC

=== Timaliidae ===
- Stachyris grammiceps (white-breasted babbler) - NT
- Stachyris thoracica (white-bibbed babbler) - LC
- Stachyris melanothorax (crescent-chested babbler) - LC
- Macronous flavicollis (grey-cheeked tit-babbler) - LC
- Malia grata (malia) - LC

=== Zosteropidae ===
- Zosterops salvadorii (Enggano white-eye) - LC
- Zosterops chloris (lemon-bellied white-eye) - LC
- Zosterops grayi (pearl-bellied white-eye) - NT
- Zosterops uropygialis (golden-bellied white-eye) - NT
- Zosterops consobrinorum (pale-bellied white-eye) - LC
- Zosterops anomalus (lemon-throated white-eye) - LC
- Zosterops wallacei (yellow-spectacled white-eye) - LC
- Zosterops atrifrons (black-crowned white-eye) - LC
- Zosterops nehrkorni (Sangihe white-eye) - CR
- Zosterops stalkeri (Seram white-eye) - NE
- Zosterops atriceps (creamy-throated white-eye) - LC
- Zosterops mysorensis (Biak white-eye) - NT
- Zosterops buruensis (Buru yellow white-eye) - LC
- Zosterops kuehni (Ambon yellow white-eye) - NT
- Tephrozosterops stalkeri (bicoloured white-eye) - LC
- Madanga ruficollis (rufous-throated white-eye) - EN
- Lophozosterops javanicus (Javan grey-throated white-eye) - LC
- Lophozosterops squamiceps (streaky-headed white-eye) - LC
- Lophozosterops superciliaris (yellow-browed white-eye) - LC
- Lophozosterops pinaiae (grey-hooded white-eye) - LC
- Lophozosterops dohertyi (crested white-eye) - LC
- Heleia crassirostris (thick-billed white-eye) - LC

=== Sturnidae ===
- Aplonis crassa (Tanimbar starling) - NT
- Aplonis mysolensis (Moluccan starling) - LC
- Aplonis magna (long-tailed starling) - LC
- Basilornis celebensis (Sulawesi myna) - LC
- Basilornis galeatus (helmeted myna) - NT
- Basilornis corythaix (long-crested myna) - LC
- Streptocitta albicollis (white-necked myna) - LC
- Streptocitta albertinae (bare-eyed myna) - NT
- Enodes erythrophris (fiery-browed myna) - LC
- Scissirostrum dubium (finch-billed myna) - LC
- Leucopsar rothschildi (Bali starling) - CR
- Sturnus melanopterus (black-winged starling) - EN

=== Turdidae ===
- Myophonus melanurus (shiny whistling-thrush) - LC
- Myophonus glaucinus (Javan whistling-thrush) - LC
- Myophonus castaneus (chestnut-winged whistling-thrush) - NE
- Zoothera heinrichi (geomalia) - NT
- Zoothera schistacea (slaty-backed thrush) - NT
- Zoothera dumasi (Buru thrush) - NT
- Zoothera joiceyi (Seram thrush) - NT
- Zoothera leucolaema (Enggano thrush) - NT
- Zoothera erythronota (red-backed thrush) - NT
- Zoothera mendeni (red-and-black thrush) - NT
- Zoothera machiki (fawn-breasted thrush) - NT
- Cataponera turdoides (Sulawesi thrush) - LC
- Cochoa beccarii (Sumatran cochoa) - VU
- Cochoa azurea (Javan cochoa) - VU
- Heinrichia calligyna (great shortwing) - LC

=== Muscicapidae ===
- Cinclidium diana (Sunda robin) - LC
- Enicurus velatus (Sunda forktail) - LC
- Eumyias additus (Buru jungle flycatcher) - NT
- Muscicapa segregata (Sumba brown flycatcher) - NT
- Ficedula rufigula (rufous-throated flycatcher) - NT
- Ficedula buruensis (cinnamon-chested flycatcher) - LC
- Ficedula henrici (Damar flycatcher) - VU
- Ficedula harterti (Sumba flycatcher) - LC
- Ficedula bonthaina (Lompobattang flycatcher) - EN
- Cyornis sanfordi (Matinan flycatcher) - EN
- Cyornis hoevelli (blue-fronted flycatcher) - LC
- Cyornis ruckii (Rueck's blue-flycatcher) - CR
- Cyornis omissus (Sulawesi blue-flycatcher) - LC
- Cyornis oscillans (Flores jungle flycatcher) - LC
- Cyornis stresemanni (Sumba jungle flycatcher) - LC
- Cyornis colonus (Sula jungle flycatcher) - NT
- Cyornis pelingensis (Banggai jungle flycatcher)

=== Chloropseidae ===
- Chloropsis media (Sumatran leafbird) - LC
- Chloropsis venusta (blue-masked leafbird) - NT

=== Dicaeidae ===
- Dicaeum annae (golden-rumped flowerpecker) - LC
- Dicaeum aureolimbatum (yellow-sided flowerpecker) - LC
- Dicaeum nehrkorni (crimson-crowned flowerpecker) - LC
- Dicaeum erythrothorax (flame-breasted flowerpecker) - LC
- Dicaeum vulneratum (ashy flowerpecker) - LC
- Dicaeum igniferum (black-fronted flowerpecker) - LC
- Dicaeum celebicum (grey-sided flowerpecker) - LC
- Dicaeum sanguinolentum (blood-breasted flowerpecker) - LC
- Dicaeum trochileum (scarlet-headed flowerpecker) - LC

=== Nectariniidae ===
- Nectarinia buettikoferi (apricot-breasted sunbird) - LC
- Aethopyga duyvenbodei (elegant sunbird) - EN
- Aethopyga eximia (white-flanked sunbird) - LC
- Aethopyga mystacalis (Javan sunbird) - LC

=== Estrildidae ===
- Lonchura molucca (black-faced munia) - LC
- Lonchura ferruginosa (white-capped munia) - LC
- Lonchura quinticolor (five-colored munia) - LC
- Lonchura pallida (pale-headed munia) - LC
- Lonchura vana (grey-banded munia) - VU
- Lonchura montana (Snow Mountain munia) - LC
- Lonchura teerinki (black-breasted munia) - LC
- Padda oryzivora (Java sparrow) - VU

== See also ==
- Fauna of Indonesia
- Fauna of New Guinea
- Lists of birds by region
- List of birds of Indonesia
