= Lesser Sundas deciduous forests =

Ecoregion in Lesser Sundas, Indonesia

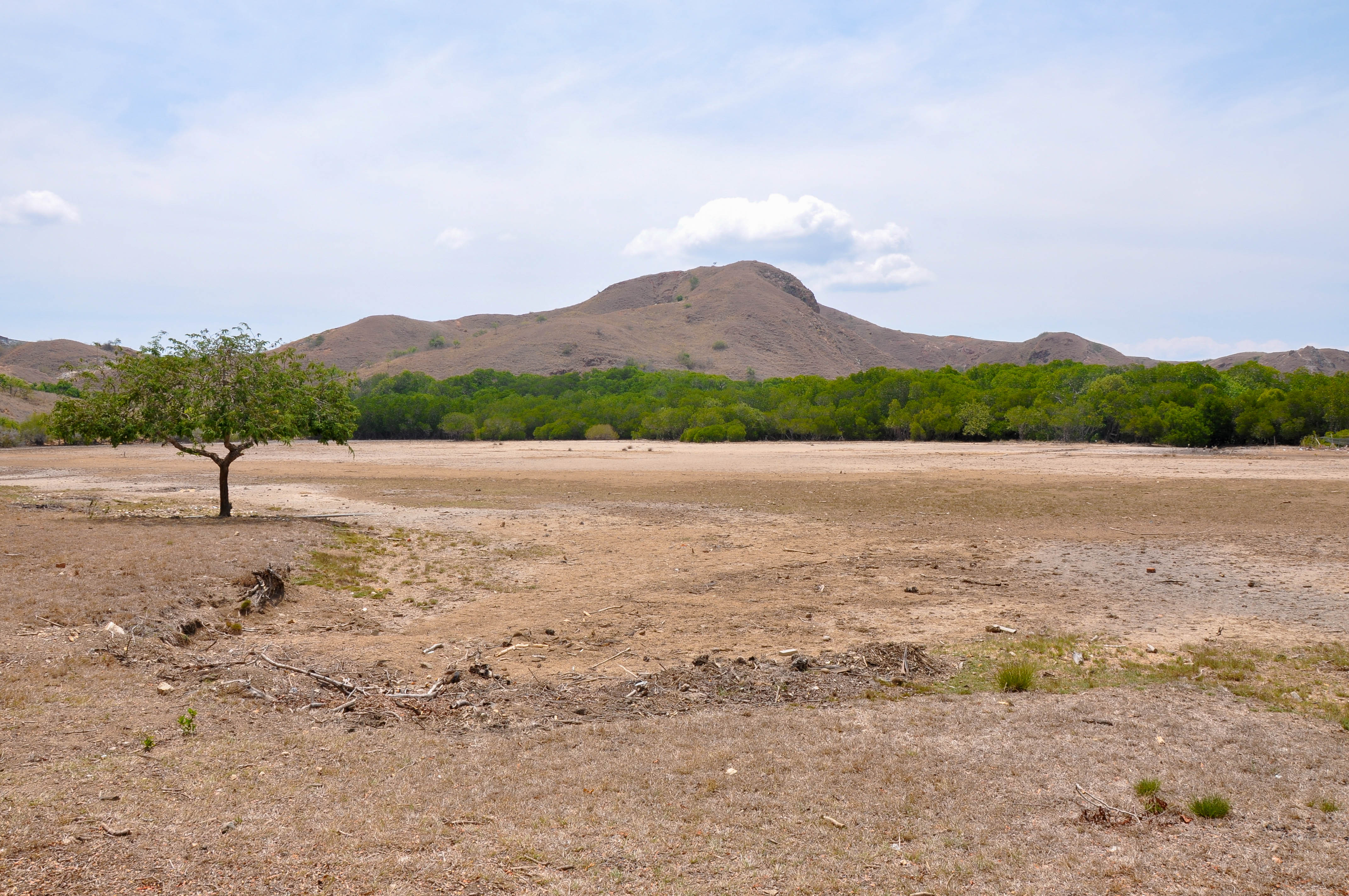
- Landscape of Rinca Island

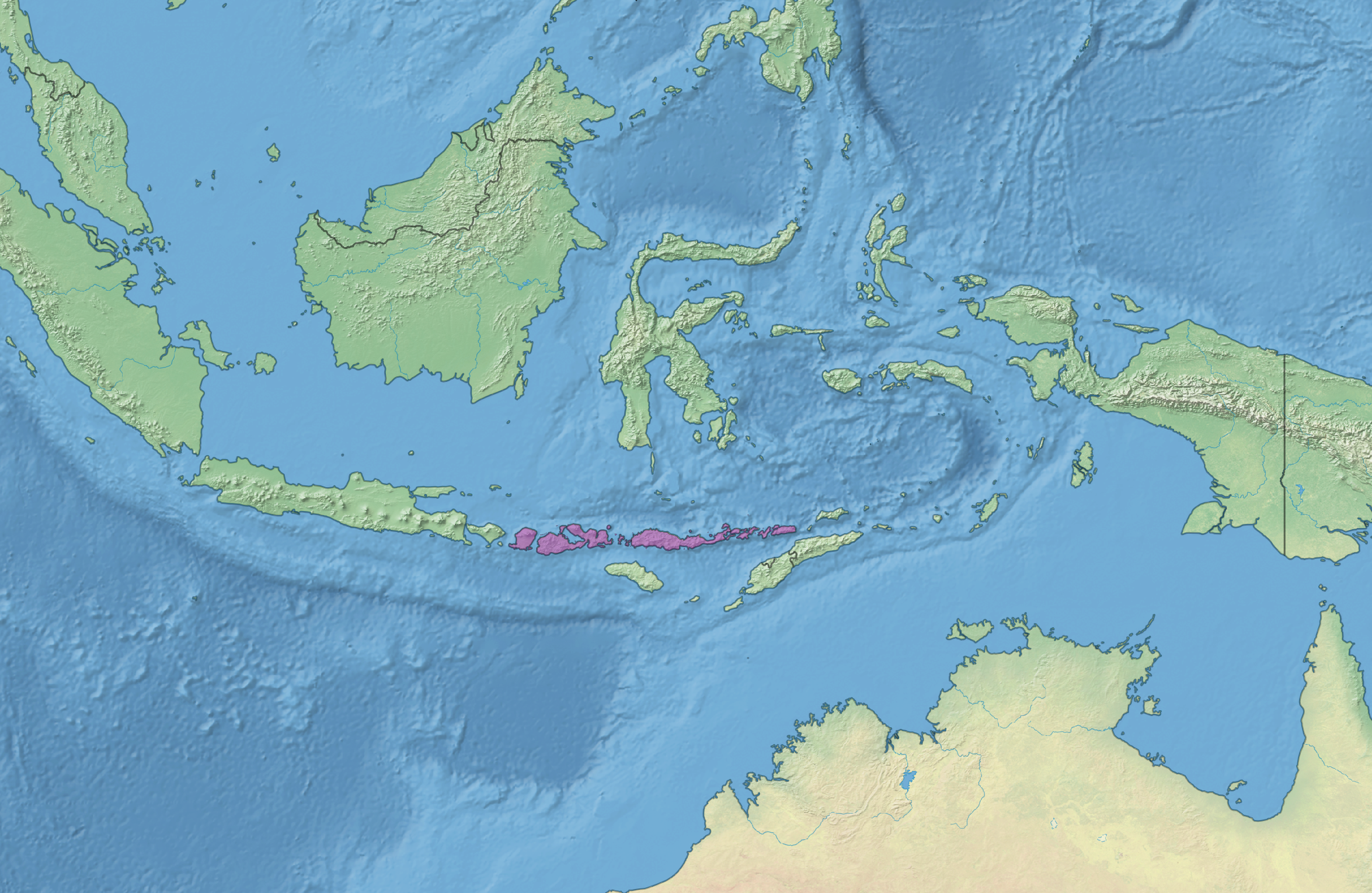
- Map of the Lesser Sundas deciduous forests (purple)

Ecology
- Realm: Australasian realm
- Biome: tropical and subtropical dry broadleaf forests

Geography
- Area: 38,842 km^{2} (14,997 mi^{2})
- Countries: Indonesia
- Provinces: East Nusa Tenggara; West Nusa Tenggara
- Coordinates: 8.6°S 120.62°E

Conservation
- Conservation status: Critical/endangered
- Protected: 3,228 km^{2} (8%)

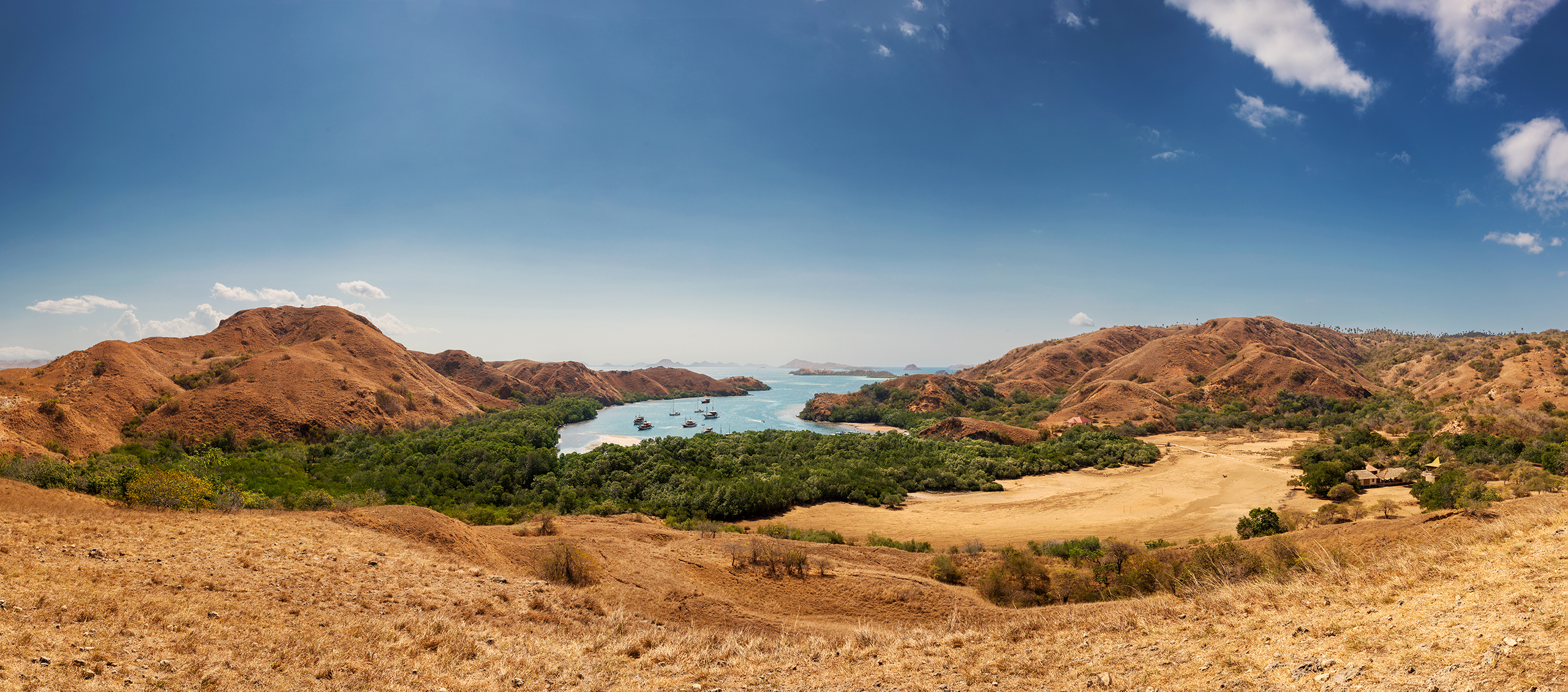
Panorama of Rinca Island, Lesser Sunda Islands.

The Lesser Sundas deciduous forests is a tropical dry forest ecoregion in Indonesia. The ecoregion includes the islands of Lombok, Sumbawa, Komodo, Flores, and Alor, along with the many adjacent smaller islands.

== Geography ==
The ecoregion includes a chain of volcanic islands in the Lesser Sunda Islands. The Lombok Strait lies at the western end of the ecoregion, separating Lombok from Bali. The Lombok Strait is part of the Wallace Line, a major biogeographic boundary separating the Indomalayan and Australasian biogeographic realms. The ecoregion is part of Wallacea, a group of islands that are part of the Australasian realm, but were never joined to either the Australian or Asian continents. The islands of Wallacea are home to a mix of plants and animals from both terrestrial realms, and have many unique species that evolved in isolation.

The Ombai Strait lies at the eastern end of the ecoregion, separating Alor from the large island of Timor to the southeast. Although both Timor and Sumba, which lies to the south, are also considered part of the Lesser Sunda Islands, they constitute separate ecoregions.

Flores is the largest of the islands at 13,540 km^{2}. The islands are mostly mountainous, and Mount Rinjani on Lombok is the highest point at 3,726 meters elevation.

== Climate ==
The ecoregion has a tropical wet and dry climate. The islands are the driest in Indonesia, with rainfall averaging 800 to 1,350 mm annually. Rainfall is strongly seasonal, falling mostly during the December-to-March rainy season. The driest months are June through September.

== Flora ==
The main plant communities are monsoon forests and savannas.

There are several distinct types of monsoon forest which vary with on rainfall and elevation. They include moist deciduous forest, dry deciduous forest, dry thorn forest, and dry evergreen forest. Evergreen montane forests grow above 1200 meters elevation.

== Fauna ==
The Komodo dragon (Varanus komodoensis), the world's largest lizard, is endemic to the ecoregion, and found on the islands of Komodo, Padar, Rinca, Gili Motang, and Flores.

The ecoregion has 50 species of mammals, including six endemic species: the Flores shrew (Suncus mertensi), Lombok flying fox (Pteropus lombocensis), Sunda long-eared bat (Nyctophilus heran), Flores long-nosed rat (Paulamys naso), Flores giant rat (Papagomys armandvillei), and Komodo rat (Komodomys rintjanus). Humans long ago introduced the Javan rusa (Rusa timorensis), a deer originating in Java and Bali, to Flores and several other islands. The banded pig (Sus scrofa vittatus) was also brought to Sumbawa, Komodo, Flores, and other islands from Sundaland. It is a source of food for both humans and Komodo dragons.

The ecoregion is home to 273 bird species. It corresponds to the Northern Nusa Tenggara endemic bird area. Of these species, 17 are endemic:

- Flores green pigeon (Treron floris)
- Wallace's hanging parrot (Loriculus flosculus)
- Glittering kingfisher (Caridonax fulgidus)
- Scaly-crowned honeyeater (Lichmera lombokia)
- Bare-throated whistler (Pachycephala nudigula)
- Brown-capped fantail (Rhipidura diluta)
- Flores monarch (Symposiachrus sacerdotum)
- Flores crow (Corvus florensis)
- Flores scops owl (Otus alfredi)
- Wallace's scops owl (Otus silvicola)
- Golden-rumped flowerpecker (Dicaeum annae)
- Black-fronted flowerpecker (Dicaeum igniferum)
- Flores minivet (Pericrocotus lansbergei)
- Cream-browed white-eye (Lophozosterops superciliaris)
- Crested white-eye (Lophozosterops dohertyi)
- Flores white-eye (Heleia crassirostris)
- Russet-capped tesia (Tesia everetti)

There are another 12 near-endemic species – Timor cuckoo-dove (Macropygia magna), pink-headed imperial pigeon (Ducula rosacea), dark-backed imperial pigeon (Ducula lacernulata), olive-headed lorikeet (Trichoglossus euteles), cinnamon-banded kingfisher (Todirhamphus australasia), pale-shouldered cicadabird (Edolisoma dohertyi), chestnut-backed thrush (Zoothera dohertyi), Flores jungle-flycatcher (Rhinomyias oscillans), yellow-spectacled white-eye (Zosterops wallacei), Timor leaf warbler (Phylloscopus presbytes), red-chested flowerpecker (Dicaeum maugei), and flame-breasted sunbird (Nectarinia solaris).

The Timor python (Malayopython timoriensis) is found on Flores.

== Protected areas ==
A 2017 assessment found that 3,228 km^{2}, or 8%, of the ecoregion is in protected areas. About half the unprotected area is still forested. Protected areas include Komodo National Park on Komodo, Padar and Rinca islands, which is a UNESCO World Heritage Site. Other protected areas include Gunung Rinjani National Park on Lombok, Kelimutu National Park and Ruteng Nature Reserve on Flores, Mount Tambora National Park and Pulau Moyo Hunting Reserve on Sumbawa, and Tuti Adagae Recreational Forest on Alor.
