= 1897 in birding and ornithology =

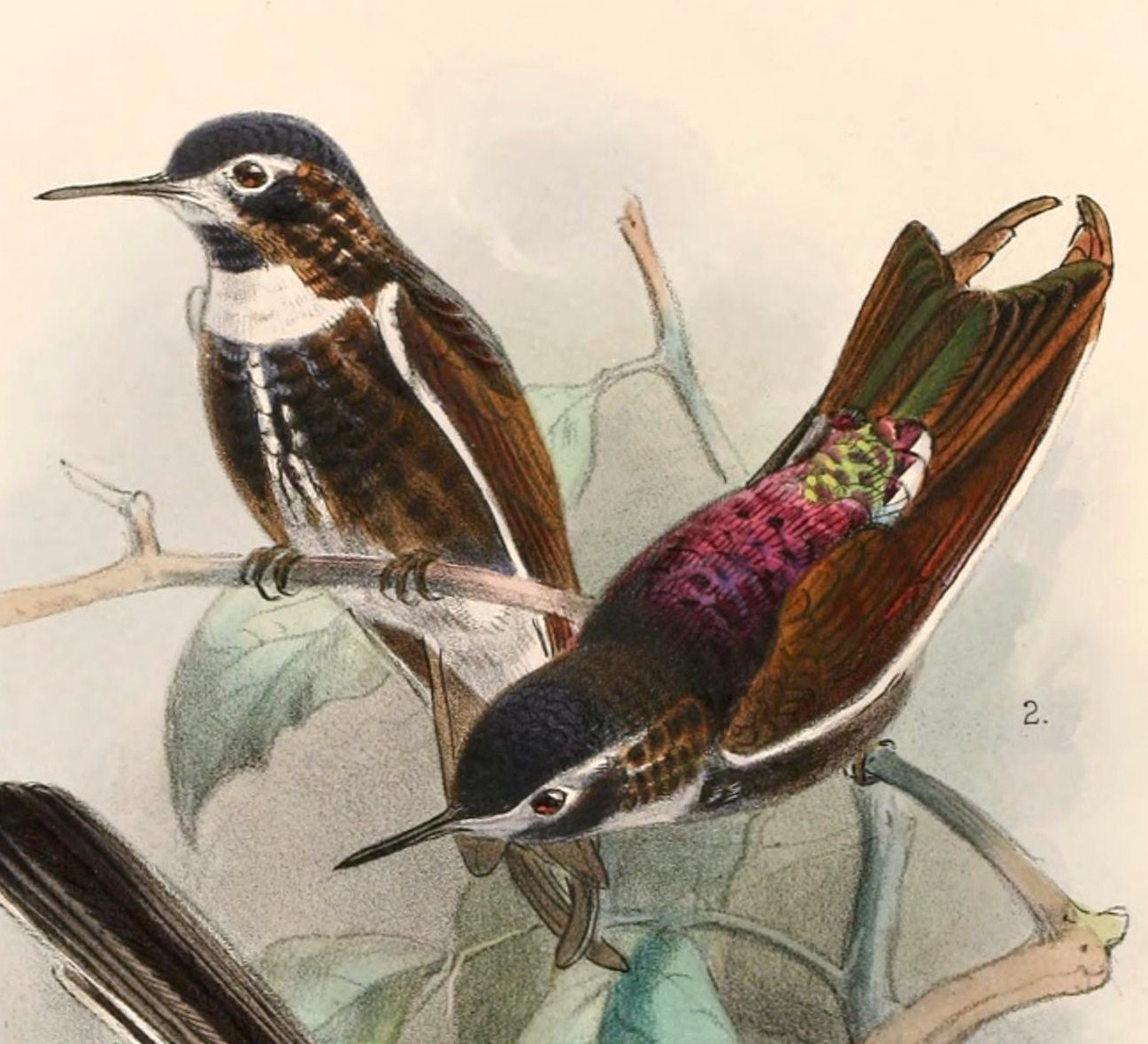
Purple-backed sunbeam Ibis 1897

- Birds described in 1897 include African crimson-winged finch, bare-throated whistler, black sittella, black solitaire, bronze parotia, cream-browed white-eye, dwarf sparrowhawk, MacGregor's honeyeater, Shelley's greenbul, sulphur-breasted warbler, thick-billed heleia,

== Events ==
- Death of Charles Bendire, Edward Newton, James William Abert

== Publications ==
- Frank Chapman Bird-Life: A Guide to the Study of Our Common Birds.
- Neltje Blanchan Bird Neighbours
- Stolzmann Oiseaux de la Ferghana d'apres les recherches faites par M. Thomas Barey (1892–1895). Par Jean Stolzmann. Bull. Soc. Imp. de Natural. Moscou, 1897, no. 1, p. 54.]

Ongoing events

- Osbert Salvin and Frederick DuCane Godman 1879–1904. Biologia Centrali-Americana . Aves
- Richard Bowdler Sharpe Catalogue of the Birds in the British Museum London,1874-98.
- Eugene W. Oates and William Thomas Blanford 1889–1898. The Fauna of British India, Including Ceylon and Burma. Vols. I-IV. Birds.
- Anton Reichenow, Jean Cabanis, Hans von Berlepsch, Otto Kleinschmidt and other members of the German Ornithologists' Society in Journal für Ornithologie online BHL
- The Ibis
- Novitates Zoologicae
- Ornithologische Monatsberichte Verlag von R. Friedländer & Sohn, Berlin.1893–1938 online Zobodat
- The Auk online BHL
- Ornis; internationale Zeitschrift für die gesammte Ornithologie.Vienna 1885-1905 online BHL
