= William Doherty =

American entomologist

William Doherty (May 15, 1857 in Cincinnati – May 25, 1901 in Nairobi) was an American entomologist who specialised in Lepidoptera and later also collected birds for the Natural History Museum at Tring. He died of dysentery while in Nairobi.

== Travels ==
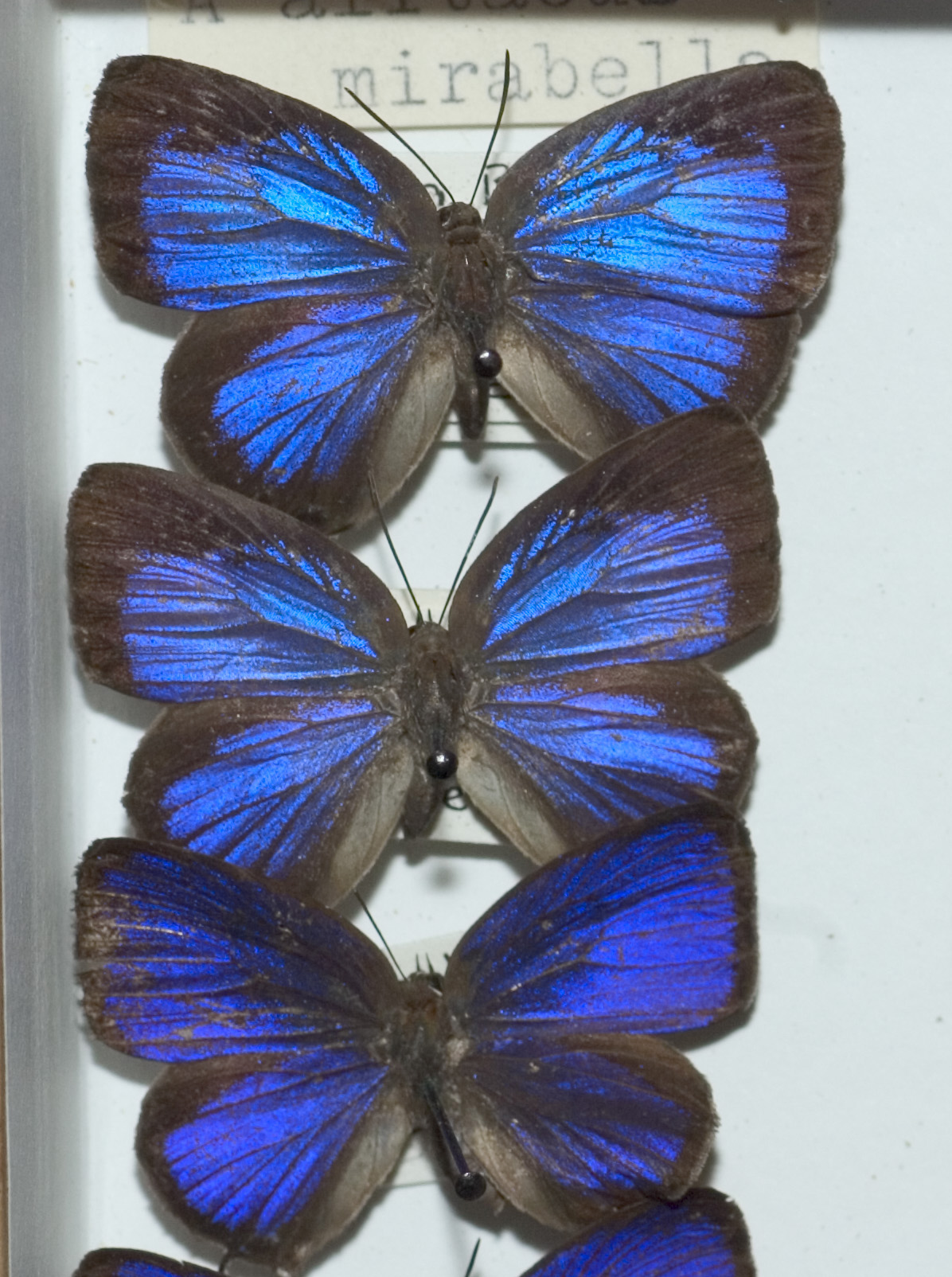
Arhopala alitaeus mirabella Doherty, 1889 J. asiat. Soc. Bengal

From 1877 to 1881, before he became a collector, he traveled widely in Europe, the Middle East and thence to Persia. His entomological collecting activities commenced in earnest in 1882 while in South Asia. He collected butterflies in India, Burma, the Andaman Islands, Nicobar, Siam, Indonesia, Malaysia, New Guinea and British East Africa and described many new species. After a visit to Hartert at Tring in 1895, he was recruited by Walter Rothschild, 2nd Baron Rothschild, who came to regarded him as his best bird collector. While collecting in Uganda, he fell ill and was carried to a hospital by his Lepcha collectors.

== Collections ==
His collections are shared between the American Museum of Natural History, the Carnegie Museum in Pittsburgh, the Brooklyn Museum, the Museum of Comparative Zoology in Cambridge, and the National Museum of Natural History in Washington.

== Eponyms ==
Many of the birds he collected for Lord Rothschild were named after him, including Doherty's bushshrike Malaconotus dohertyi, red-naped fruit dove Ptilinopus dohertyi, Sumba cicadabird Coracina dohertyi and crested white-eye Lophozosterops dohertyi.
