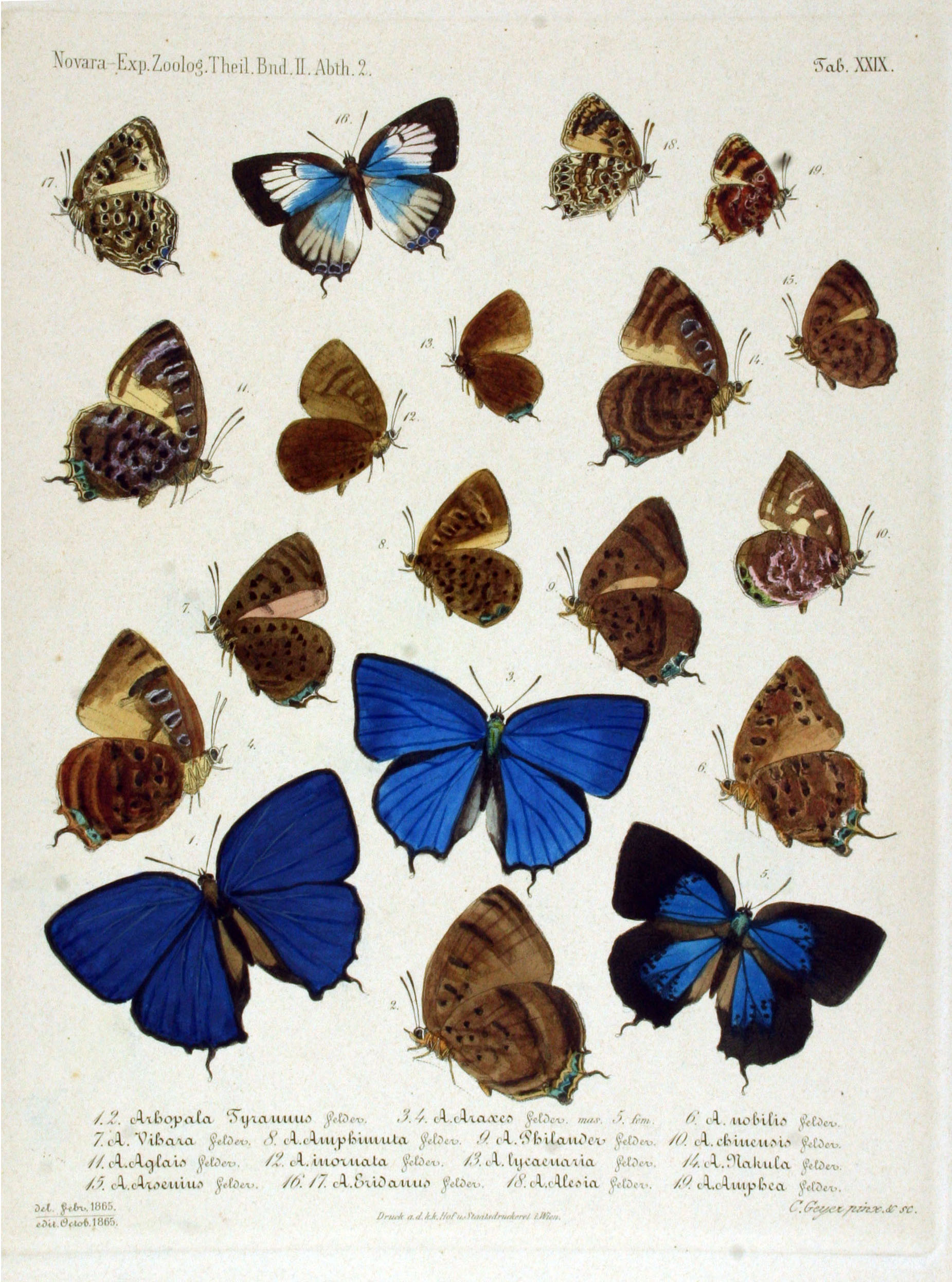
- Arhopala arsenius in Felder and Felder Reise der Osterreichischen Fregatte Novara

Scientific classification
- Kingdom: Animalia
- Phylum: Arthropoda
- Clade: Pancrustacea
- Class: Insecta
- Order: Lepidoptera
- Family: Lycaenidae
- Genus: Arhopala
- Species: A. arsenius

Binomial name
- Arhopala arsenius Cajetan Felder and Rudolf Felder, 1865.

= Arhopala arsenius =

Species of butterfly

Arhopala arsenius is a butterfly in the family Lycaenidae. It was described by Cajetan Felder and Rudolf Felder in 1865. It is found in the Indomalayan realm where it is endemic to the Philippines (Luzon and Mindoro).

== Description ==
It is smaller than labuana, with a very broad black margin above, particularly in the female. Beneath the margins of the transverse bands in the forewing are not undulate, but the bands are quite uniform, whereas in the hindwing the discal arcuate bands are several times interrupted.40 to 41 mm.
