= Sunda whistler =

Sunda whistler may refer to:

- Bare-throated whistler, a species of bird endemic to Indonesia.
- Fawn-breasted whistler, a species of bird found in Indonesia and East Timor
