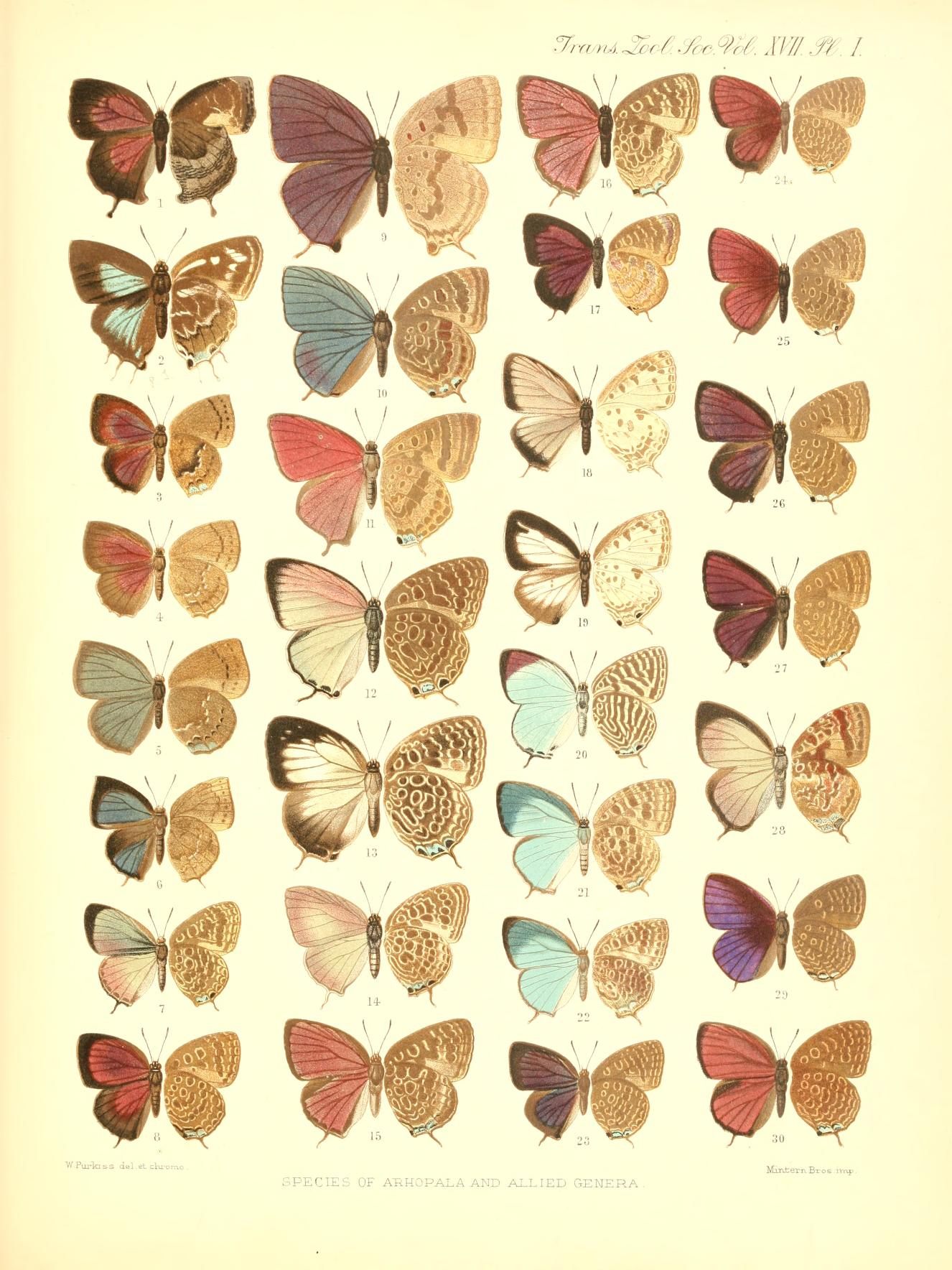
- Arhopala dohertyi in Bethune-Baker A revision of the Amblypodia Group Transactions of the Zoological Society of London (1903)

Scientific classification
- Kingdom: Animalia
- Phylum: Arthropoda
- Clade: Pancrustacea
- Class: Insecta
- Order: Lepidoptera
- Family: Lycaenidae
- Genus: Arhopala
- Species: A. dohertyi

Binomial name
- Arhopala dohertyi Bethune-Baker, 1903

= Arhopala dohertyi =

Species of butterfly

Arhopala dohertyi is a butterfly in the family Lycaenidae. It was described by George Thomas Bethune-Baker in 1903. It is found in the Indomalayan realm where it is endemic to Celebes. The specific name honours William Doherty.

It is very similar to Arhopala aida on the under surface; but above deep violettish blue, the black marginal band is very broad, in the forewing as much as 4 mm, in the hindwing extending almost to the centre of the wing.
