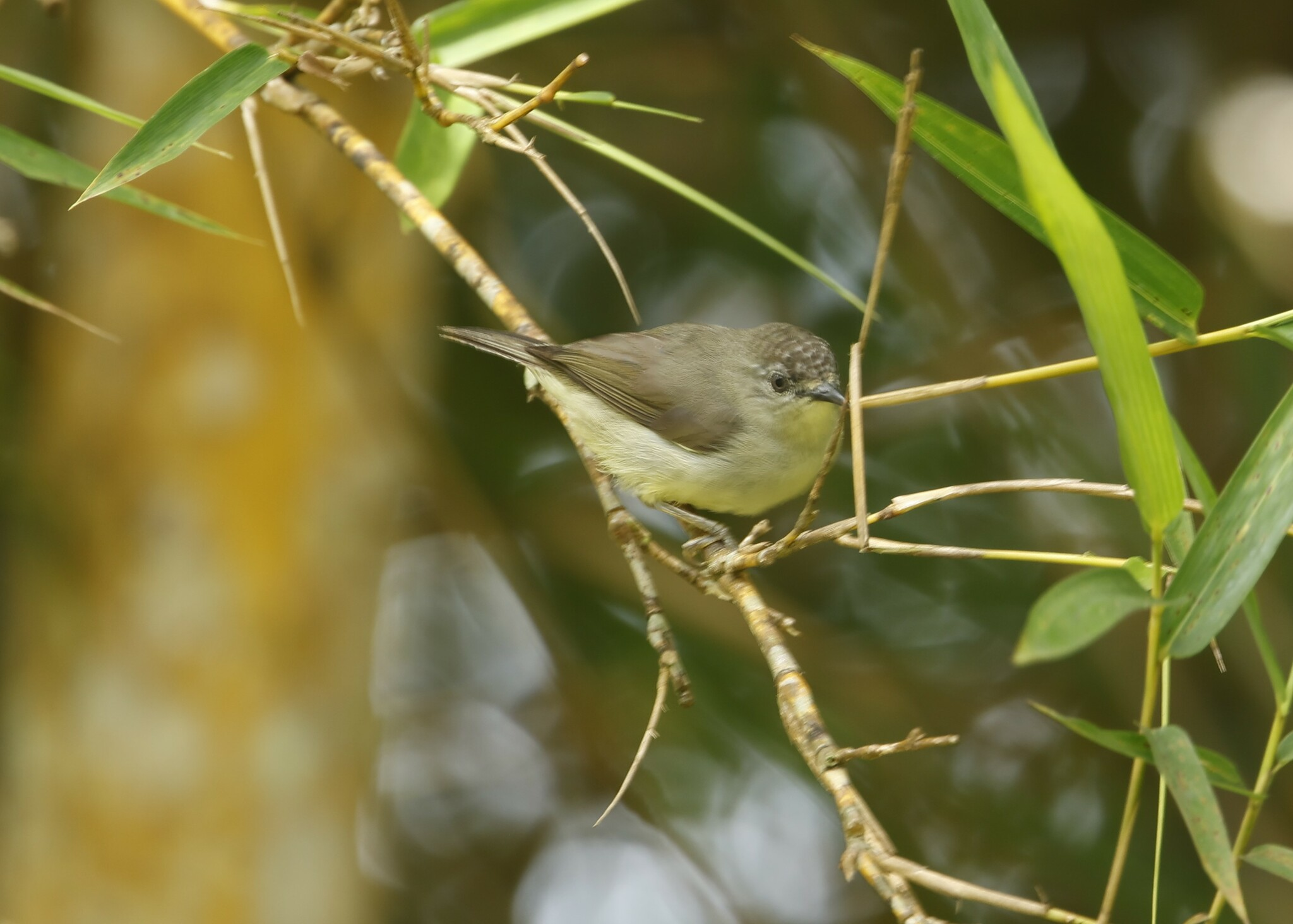

Conservation status
- Least Concern (IUCN 3.1)

Scientific classification
- Kingdom: Animalia
- Phylum: Chordata
- Class: Aves
- Order: Passeriformes
- Family: Zosteropidae
- Genus: Heleia
- Species: H. squamifrons

Binomial name
- Heleia squamifrons (Sharpe, 1892)

= Pygmy heleia =

Species of bird

The pygmy heleia (Heleia squamifrons), also known as the Bornean ibon, pygmy ibon, and pygmy white-eye, is a species of bird in the white-eye family Zosteropidae.

== Description ==
The pygmy heleia possesses a gray-brown and yellow coloring, along with a white-speckled forehead that has been described as 'scaly'.

== Distribution and habitat ==
It is endemic to the hill forest and lower montane forest of northern Borneo.

== Behaviour ==
It feeds on small berries, fruits, seeds and insects, foraging in small flocks of 4 to 8 birds. It will associate with other birds when feeding, including other white-eyes, cuckoo-doves, yuhinas and erpornises. The species is common but inconspicuous. Its calls are high-pitched.
