= August Spennemann =

August Spennemann (c. 1878 – 1945) was a German amateur ornithologist who lived in Java for 25 years (1915–1940). During his Indonesian years he resided mostly at Pegadenbaru, Subang regency, and Bandung, in the province of West Java. After 1930 he reportedly lived at Parakansalam near Purwakarta, also in West Java, until he was interned by the Dutch in May 1940. He died in an allied prison camp in then British India. While he was living in West Java he compiled an account of his observations in the late 1920s of the Javan lapwing, near Pamanukan in West Java province. The typescript of his notes was lost until 2000 when it turned up at the Zoological Museum in Amsterdam. His notebook was located as well, indicating that he lastly observed the lapwings in 1931. Spennemann's notes include descriptions of the hitherto unrecorded behaviour and calls of the poorly known bird, which was last seen in 1940 and is now probably extinct.
