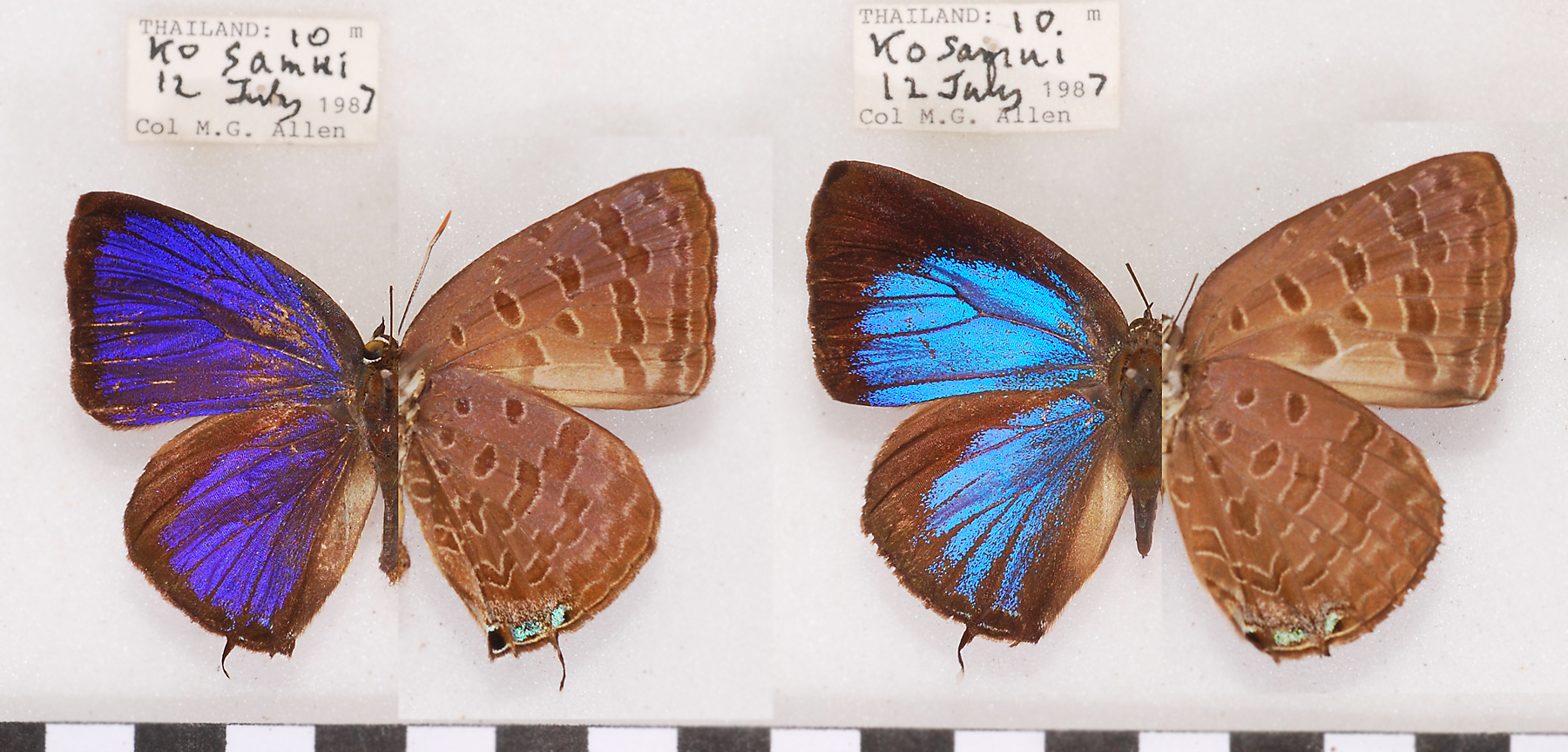
- Male and female
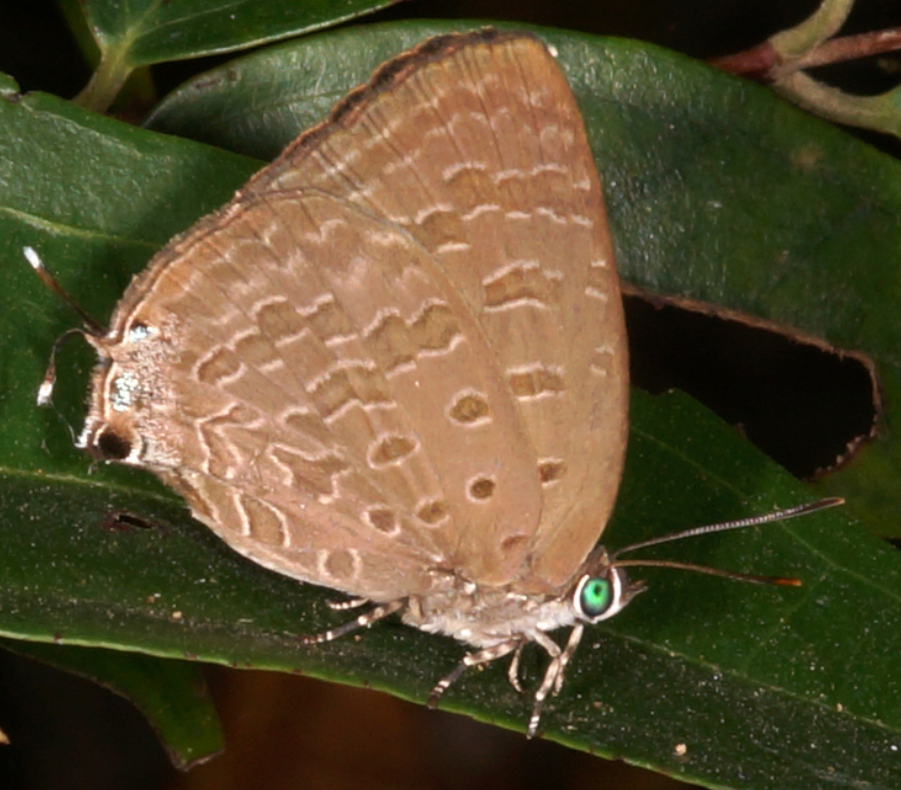

Scientific classification
- Kingdom: Animalia
- Phylum: Arthropoda
- Clade: Pancrustacea
- Class: Insecta
- Order: Lepidoptera
- Family: Lycaenidae
- Genus: Arhopala
- Species: A. aida

Binomial name
- Arhopala aida de Nicéville, 1889

Synonyms
- Narathura aida ophir Evans, 1957

= Arhopala aida =

White-stained oakblue

Species of butterfly

Arhopala aida or white-stained oakblue, is a species of butterfly belonging to the lycaenid family described by Lionel de Nicéville in 1889. It is found in Southeast Asia (Burma, Mergui, Thailand, Langkawi, Pulau Tenggol, Indochina, Hainan, and Peninsular Malaya). The upper surface of the male is lilac the black marginal band on both wings above equally broad. The under surface is brown with a distinct violet gloss;forewing with a light hindmarginal area. The female is above bluer, lighter than the male, and has a much broader black margin. aida differs from Ahropalus myrtale in its darker and more violet-blue and its broad outer margins; the undersides are, however, very much alike.

== Subspecies ==
- Arhopala aida aida
- Arhopala aida ophir (Evans, 1957) (Peninsular Malaya: Mount Ophir)
