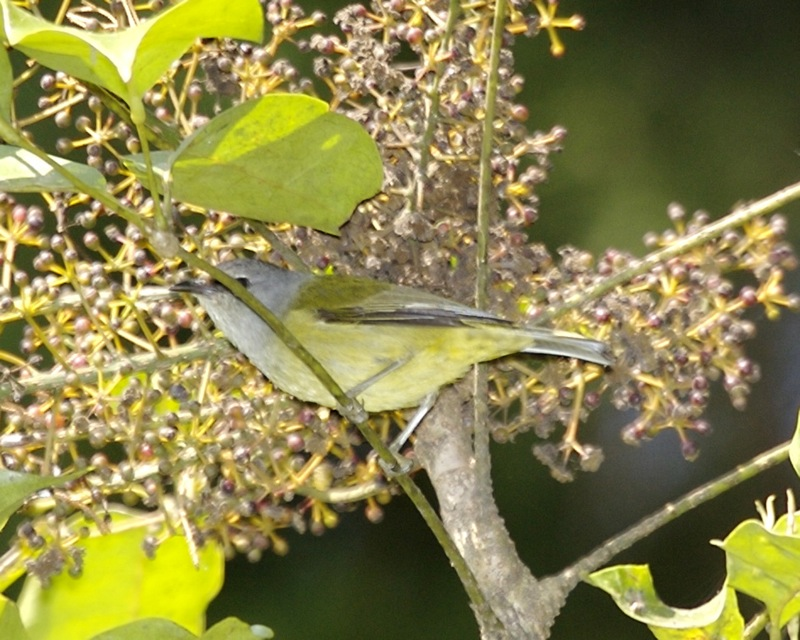
- Mees's white-eye, Heleia javanica

Scientific classification
- Kingdom: Animalia
- Phylum: Chordata
- Class: Aves
- Order: Passeriformes
- Family: Zosteropidae
- Genus: Heleia; Hartlaub, 1865

Type species
- Heleia muelleri (Timor heleia) Hartlaub, 1865

= Heleia =

Genus of birds

Heleia is a genus of birds in the white-eye family Zosteropidae. One species, the Timor heleia is restricted to the island of Timor. The pygmy heleia is endemic to the island of Borneo. The thick-billed heleia, occurs on Flores and Sumbawa.

== Taxonomy ==
The genus Heleia was introduced in 1865 by the German ornithologist Gustav Hartlaub to accommodate the Timor heleia. The name is from Ancient Greek eleia, an unidentified small bird mentioned by the Greek scholar Callimachus.

The genus contains the following ten species:

Image	Common name	Scientific name	Distribution
	Javan heleia	Heleia javanica	montane Java and Bali
	Grey-hooded heleia	Heleia pinaiae	montane central Seram (central east Moluccas)
	Pygmy heleia	Heleia squamifrons	Borneo
	Mindanao heleia	Heleia goodfellowi	montane Mindanao (south Philippines)
	Sulawesi heleia	Heleia squamiceps	montane Sulawesi
	Eyebrowed heleia	Heleia superciliaris	montane Sumbawa and Flores (west, central Lesser Sunda Islands)
	Crested heleia	Heleia dohertyi	Sumbawa to Flores (west, central Lesser Sunda Islands)
	Timor heleia	Heleia muelleri	Timor (east Lesser Sunda Islands)
	Thick-billed heleia	Heleia crassirostris	Sumbawa and Flores (west, central Lesser Sunda Islands)
	Yellow-spectacled heleia	Heleia wallacei	Sumbawa to Sumba and Lembata (west, central Lesser Sunda Islands)
