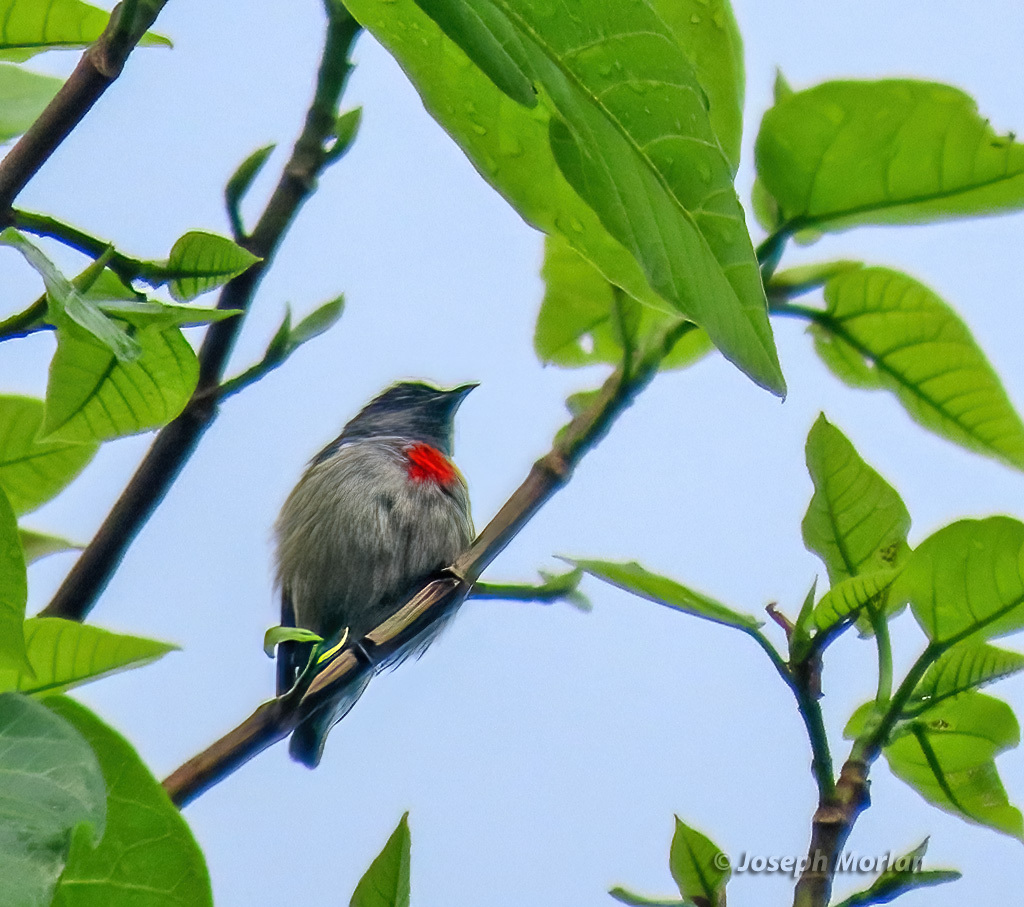

Conservation status
- Least Concern (IUCN 3.1)

Scientific classification
- Kingdom: Animalia
- Phylum: Chordata
- Class: Aves
- Order: Passeriformes
- Family: Dicaeidae
- Genus: Dicaeum
- Species: D. schistaceiceps

Binomial name
- Dicaeum schistaceiceps GR Gray, 1861

= Halmahera flowerpecker =

Species of bird

The Halmahera flowerpecker (Dicaeum schistaceiceps) is a species of bird in the family Dicaeidae. It is native to North Maluku, Indonesia. Its natural habitats are subtropical or tropical moist lowland forest and subtropical or tropical moist montane forest. It was recently considered conspecific with the Buru flowerpecker.
