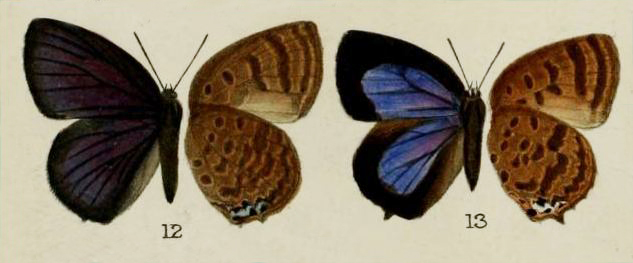
- Arhopala labuana, male, female, from original description

Scientific classification
- Kingdom: Animalia
- Phylum: Arthropoda
- Clade: Pancrustacea
- Class: Insecta
- Order: Lepidoptera
- Family: Lycaenidae
- Genus: Arhopala
- Species: A. labuana

Binomial name
- Arhopala labuana Bethune-Baker, 1896

= Arhopala labuana =

Species of butterfly

Arhopala labuana , is a butterfly in the family Lycaenidae. It was described by George Thomas Bethune-Baker in 1896. It is found in the Indomalayan realm (Burma, Peninsular Malaya, Sumatra, Pagi, and Borneo).

== Description ==
The upper surface in the male is lighter, the blue colour is more of an ultramarine than violet tint [than in related species]. Beneath similar to dohertyi, the transverse bands in the forewing straighter and more regular, in the hindwing, however, more interrupted than in dohertyi. The female is above of a very bright blue with a broad (4.5 mm.) black, more distinctly defined distal band.
