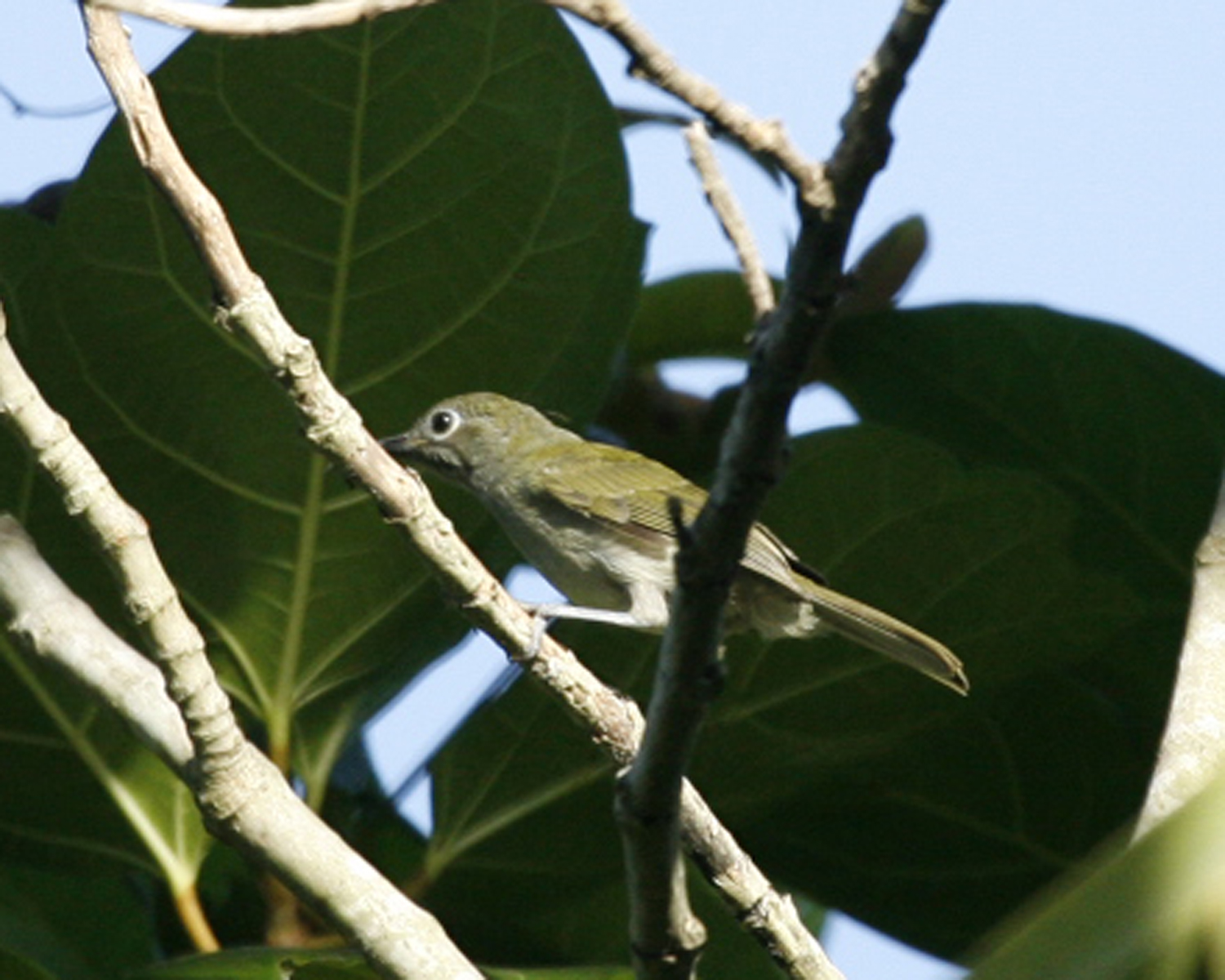

Conservation status
- Least Concern (IUCN 3.1)

Scientific classification
- Kingdom: Animalia
- Phylum: Chordata
- Class: Aves
- Order: Passeriformes
- Family: Zosteropidae
- Genus: Heleia
- Species: H. pinaiae

Binomial name
- Heleia pinaiae (Stresemann, 1912)

= Grey-hooded heleia =

Species of bird

The grey-hooded heleia (Heleia pinaiae), also known as the grey-hooded white-eye and grey-hooded ibon, is a species of bird in the family Zosteropidae. It is endemic to Seram Island. Its natural habitat is subtropical or tropical moist montane forest.
