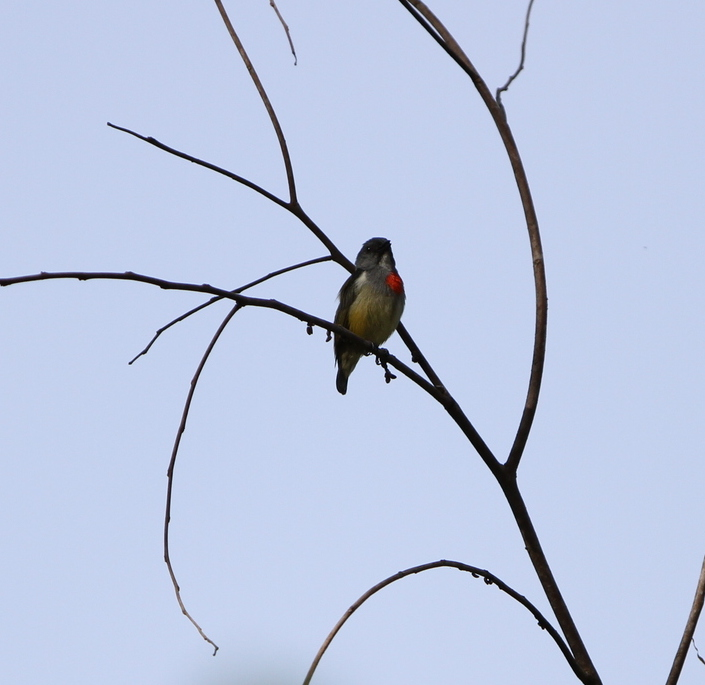

Conservation status
- Least Concern (IUCN 3.1)

Scientific classification
- Kingdom: Animalia
- Phylum: Chordata
- Class: Aves
- Order: Passeriformes
- Family: Dicaeidae
- Genus: Dicaeum
- Species: D. erythrothorax

Binomial name
- Dicaeum erythrothorax Lesson & Garnot, 1828

= Buru flowerpecker =

Species of bird

The Buru flowerpecker (Dicaeum erythrothorax) is a species of bird in the family Dicaeidae. It is endemic to the Maluku Islands in Indonesia. Its natural habitats are subtropical or tropical moist lowland forest and subtropical or tropical moist montane forest. It is restricted to Buru.

The Halmahera flowerpecker was until recently considered a subspecies.
