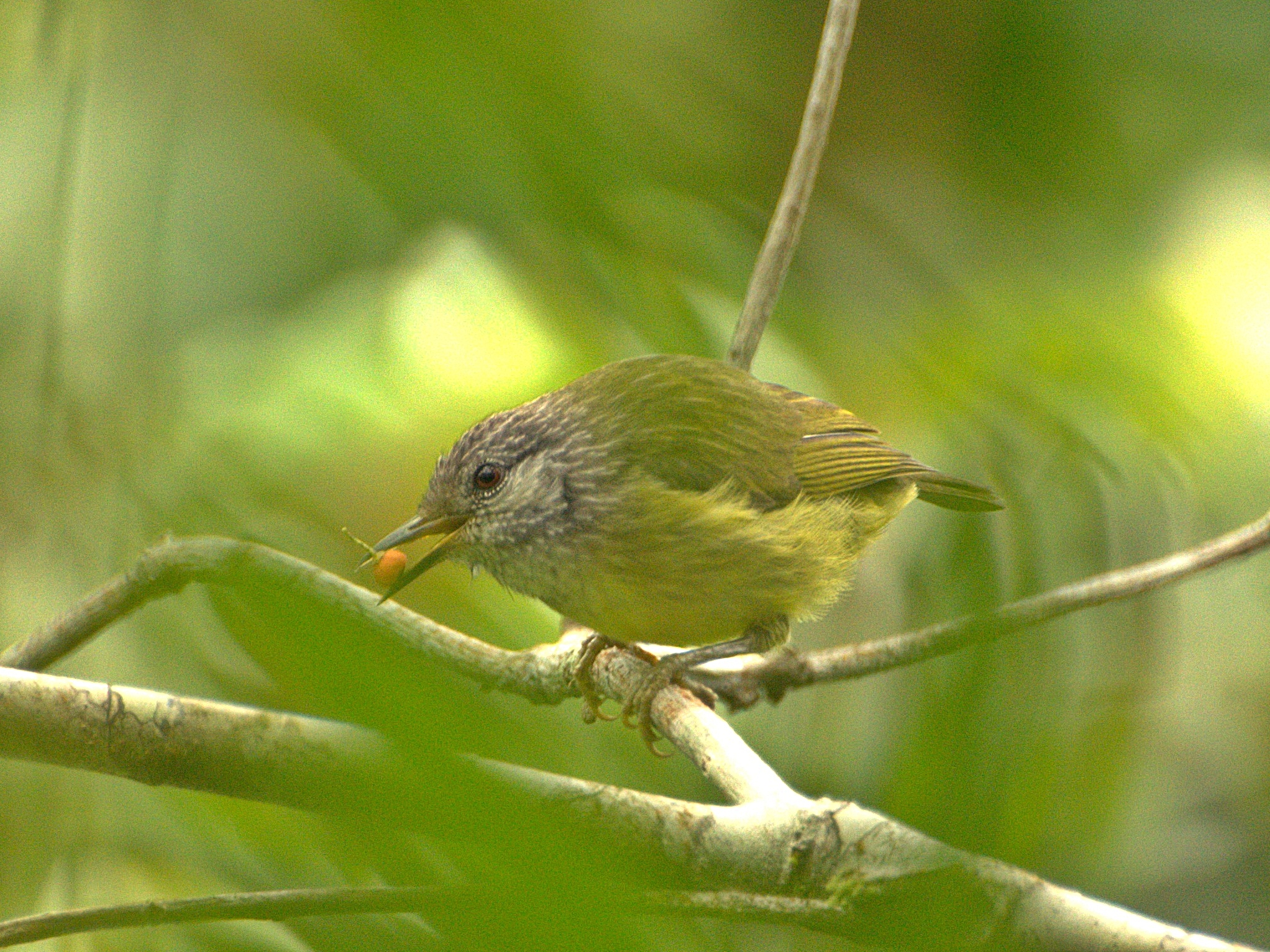

Conservation status
- Least Concern (IUCN 3.1)

Scientific classification
- Kingdom: Animalia
- Phylum: Chordata
- Class: Aves
- Order: Passeriformes
- Family: Zosteropidae
- Genus: Heleia
- Species: H. squamiceps

Binomial name
- Heleia squamiceps (Hartert, 1896)

= Sulawesi heleia =

Species of bird

The Sulawesi heleia (Heleia squamiceps), also known as the streaky-headed white-eye and streak-headed ibon, is a species of bird in the family Zosteropidae. It is endemic to Sulawesi, Indonesia. Its natural habitat is subtropical or tropical moist montane forest.
