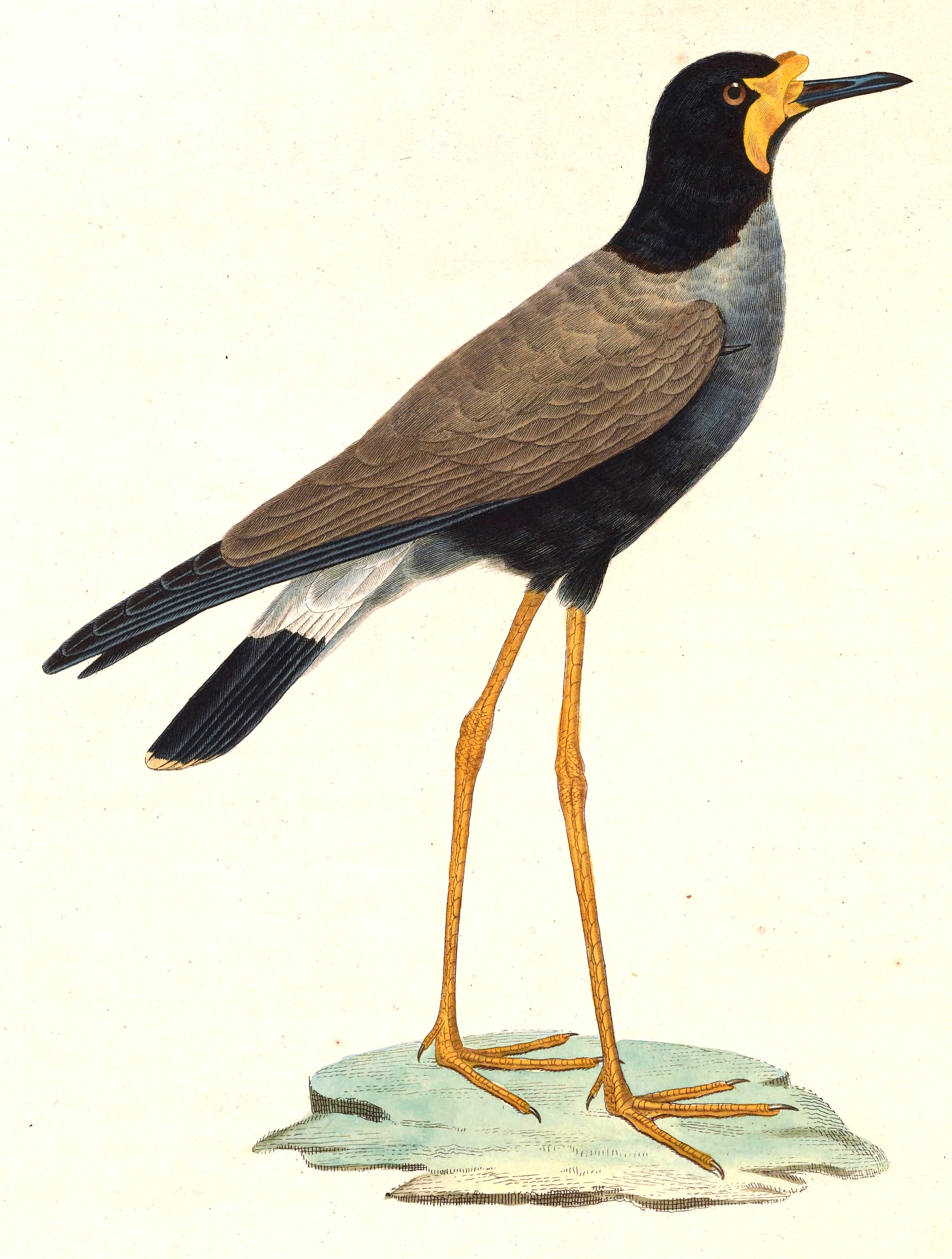

Conservation status
- Critically endangered, possibly extinct (IUCN 3.1)

Scientific classification
- Kingdom: Animalia
- Phylum: Chordata
- Class: Aves
- Order: Charadriiformes
- Family: Charadriidae
- Genus: Vanellus
- Species: V. macropterus

Binomial name
- Vanellus macropterus (Wagler, 1827)

Synonyms
- Charadrius macropterus Wagler, 1827; Rogibyx macropterus (Wagler, 1827)

= Javan lapwing =

Species of bird

The Javan lapwing (Vanellus macropterus) also known as Javanese lapwing and Javanese wattled lapwing is a wader in the lapwing family.

Turnaround video of a specimen at Naturalis Biodiversity Center

== Distribution and habitat ==
This large, long-legged wader inhabited wide steppe-like marshes in river deltas and behind coastal sand dunes in Java. The species is known historically from two areas on the island of Java, one in the west along the north coast and one in the east along the south coast.

== Extinction ==
The species was last seen in 1940. Habitat degradation and loss may have been to blame for the species decline. The IUCN classified it as extinct in their 1994 and 1996 assessments, but uplisted it in 2000 and listed the species as Critically Endangered (CR).

In an assessment dated October 1, 2016, the IUCN justified the classification:

"This conspicuous species has not been recorded since 1940, and it is likely to have declined severely owing to extensive habitat degradation and destruction, probably compounded by significant hunting pressure. However, not all potential habitat has been surveyed, and local reports need to be followed up with dedicated surveys. Any remaining population is likely to be tiny, and for these reasons it is treated as Critically Endangered."

The IUCN clarifies by citing "unconfirmed reports" by locals from 2013. While acknowledging that finding live individuals is "unlikely", insight gained from observations in the 1920s may point to additional habitats not previously considered. Specifically grasslands on Belitung Island may be one such location to be surveyed. However, a 2018 study, citing previous patterns of bird population decline and the lack of any confirmed sightings, recommended uplisting the species to Critically Endangered (Possibly Extinct). The IUCN Red List agreed with this assessment on the 9th of August 2019.

== See also ==
- August Spennemann
