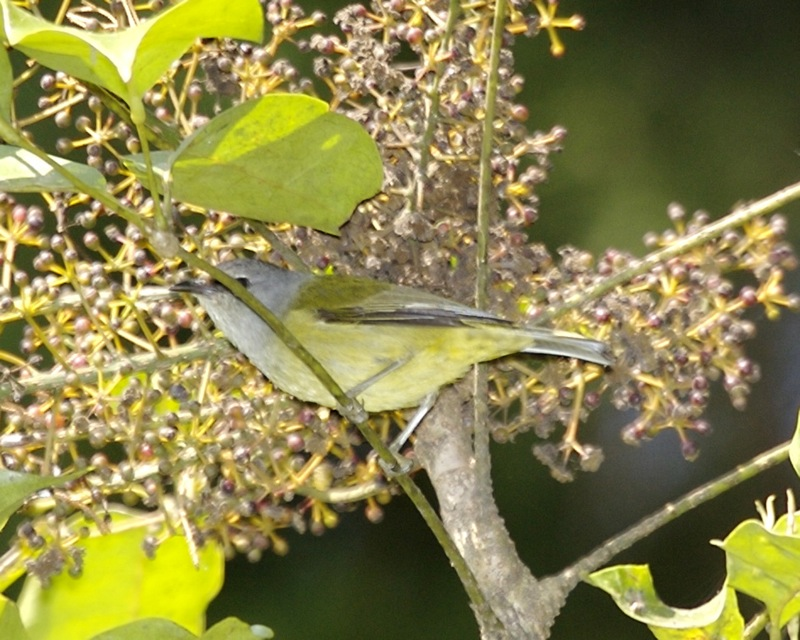

Conservation status
- Least Concern (IUCN 3.1)

Scientific classification
- Kingdom: Animalia
- Phylum: Chordata
- Class: Aves
- Order: Passeriformes
- Family: Zosteropidae
- Genus: Heleia
- Species: H. javanica

Binomial name
- Heleia javanica (Horsfield, 1821)

= Javan heleia =

Species of bird

The Javan heleia (Heleia javanica), also known as the Javan grey-throated white-eye, grey-throated ibon, Javan heleia or Mees's white-eye, is a species of bird in the family Zosteropidae. It is endemic to Java and Bali.
