= Green-winged bulbul =

Green-winged bulbul may refer to:

- Cinereous bulbul (connectens), a subspecies of bird found on northern Borneo
- Mountain bulbul, a species of bird found in Southeast Asia
- Sunda bulbul, a species of bird found on Sumatra and Java
