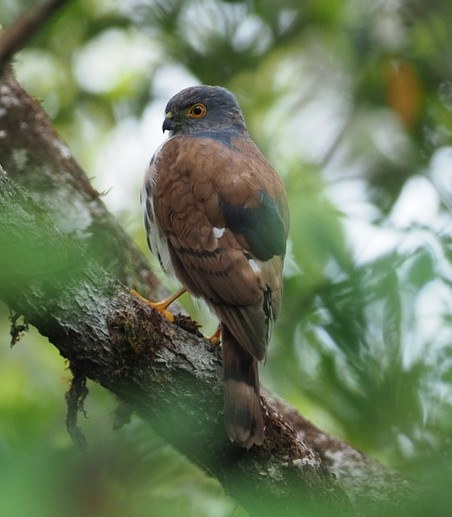

Conservation status
- Least Concern (IUCN 3.1)

Scientific classification
- Kingdom: Animalia
- Phylum: Chordata
- Class: Aves
- Order: Accipitriformes
- Family: Accipitridae
- Genus: Tachyspiza
- Species: T. nanus

Binomial name
- Tachyspiza nanus (Blasius, 1897)

= Dwarf sparrowhawk =

Species of bird

The dwarf sparrowhawk (Tachyspiza nanus), also known as the small sparrowhawk, is a species of bird of prey in the family Accipitridae. It was formerly placed in the genus Accipiter.

It is endemic to Indonesian islands of Sulawesi and Buton. Its natural habitats are subtropical or tropical moist montane forests and to a lesser degree lowland forests. It closely resembles the fellow Wallacean vinous-breasted sparrowhawk, but is still thought to be most closely related to besra. All this makes it rather difficult to identify and thus possibly under-recorded. It is one of the smallest members of its family (length approximately 25 cm/10in). Hunts insects and small birds.

It is threatened by habitat loss. There are not many verified recordings of this species, but it is known to occur at least in Lore Lindu National Park.

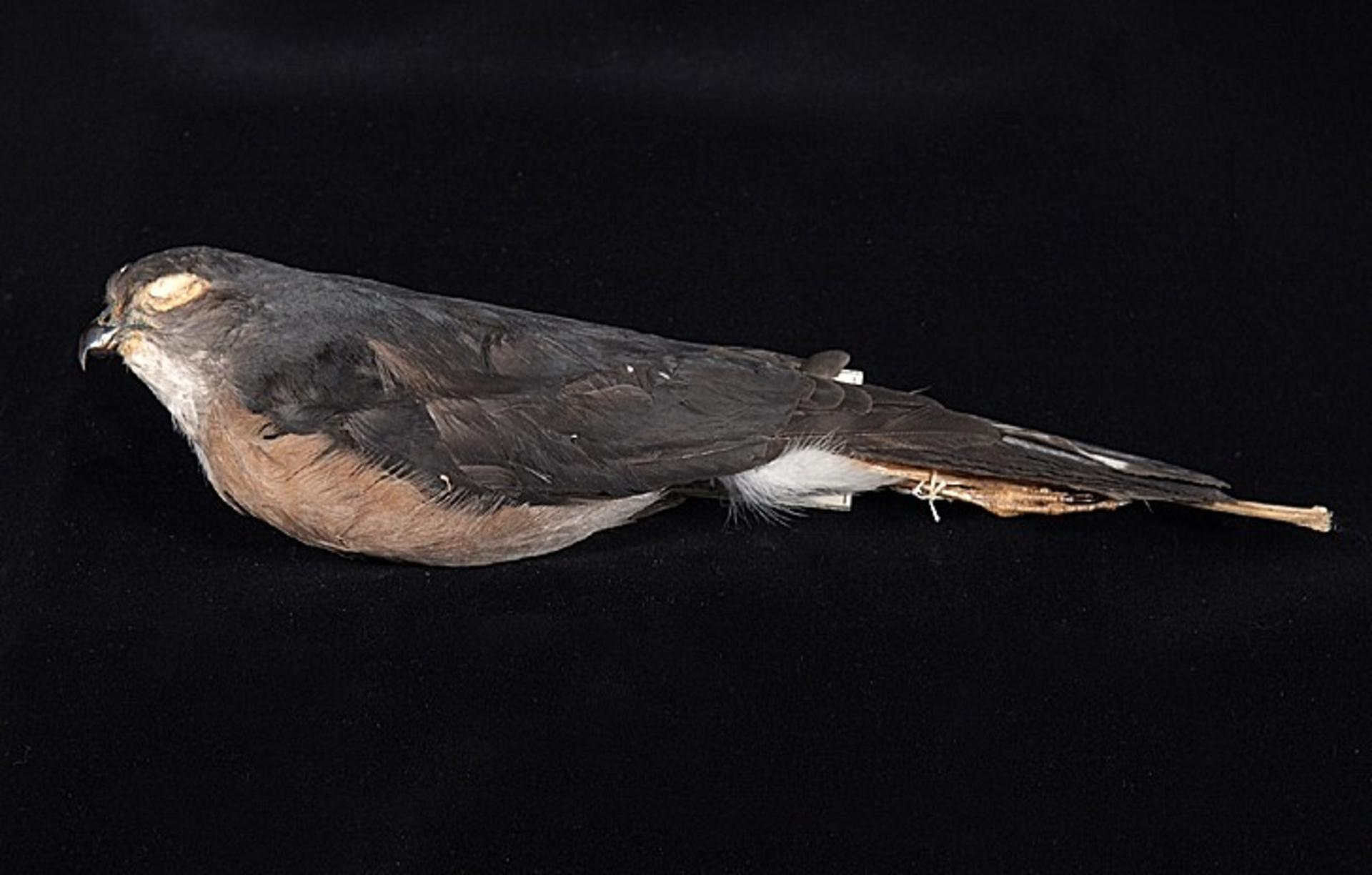
Study skin of Tachyspiza nanus, collected in 1897.
