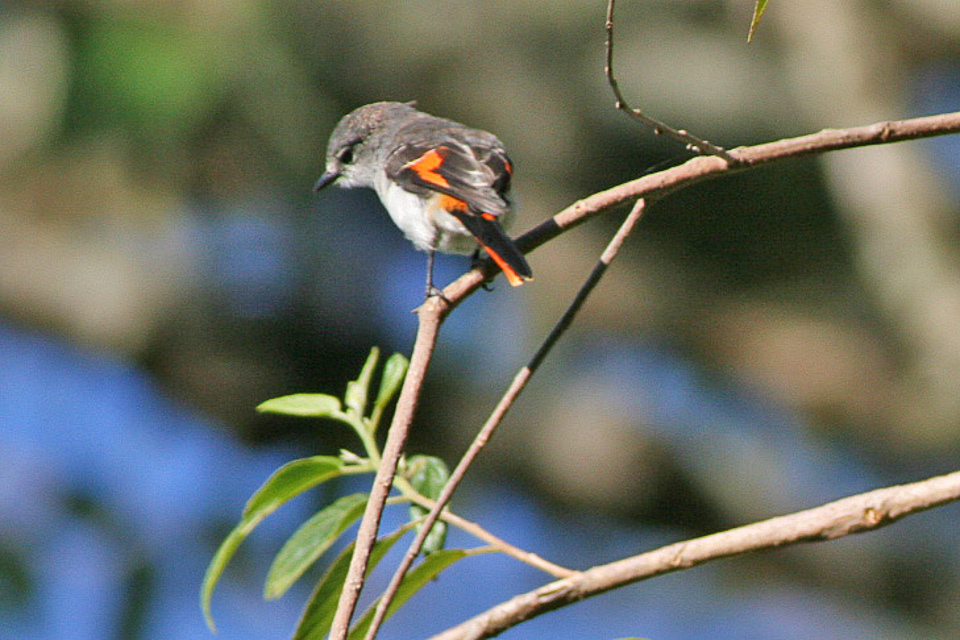

Conservation status
- Least Concern (IUCN 3.1)

Scientific classification
- Kingdom: Animalia
- Phylum: Chordata
- Class: Aves
- Order: Passeriformes
- Family: Campephagidae
- Genus: Pericrocotus
- Species: P. lansbergei

Binomial name
- Pericrocotus lansbergei Büttikofer, 1886

= Little minivet =

Species of bird

The little minivet (Pericrocotus lansbergei), also known as the Flores minivet, is a species of bird in the family Campephagidae. It is endemic to Indonesia. Its natural habitat is subtropical or tropical moist lowland forest.
