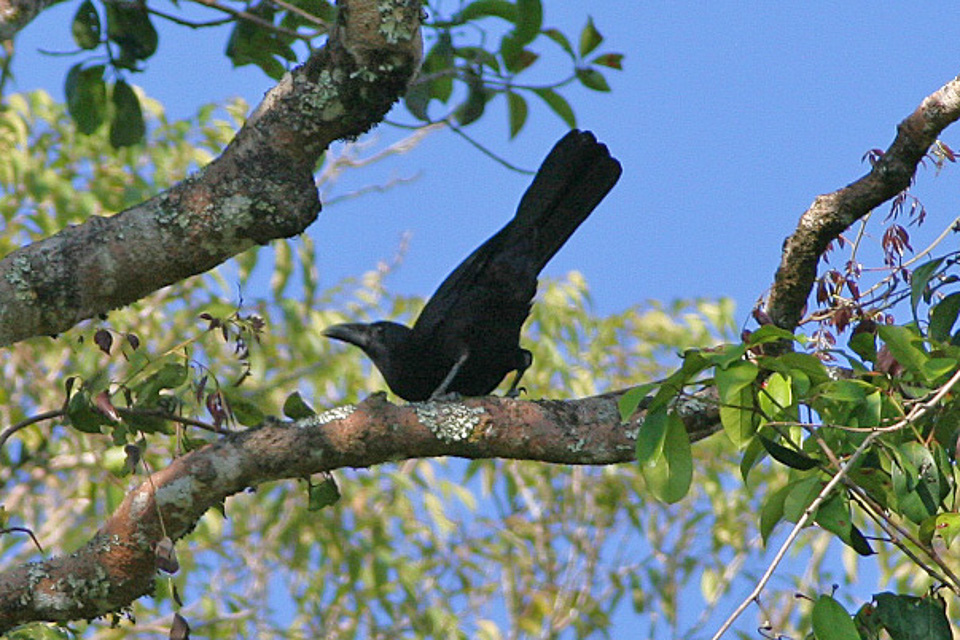

Conservation status
- Endangered (IUCN 3.1)

Scientific classification
- Kingdom: Animalia
- Phylum: Chordata
- Class: Aves
- Order: Passeriformes
- Family: Corvidae
- Genus: Corvus
- Species: C. florensis

Binomial name
- Corvus florensis Büttikofer, 1894

= Flores crow =

Species of bird

The Flores crow (Corvus florensis) is a species of bird in the family Corvidae. It is endemic to Indonesia.

Its natural habitats are subtropical or tropical dry forest and subtropical or tropical moist lowland forest. It is threatened by habitat loss.

It is omnivorous.
