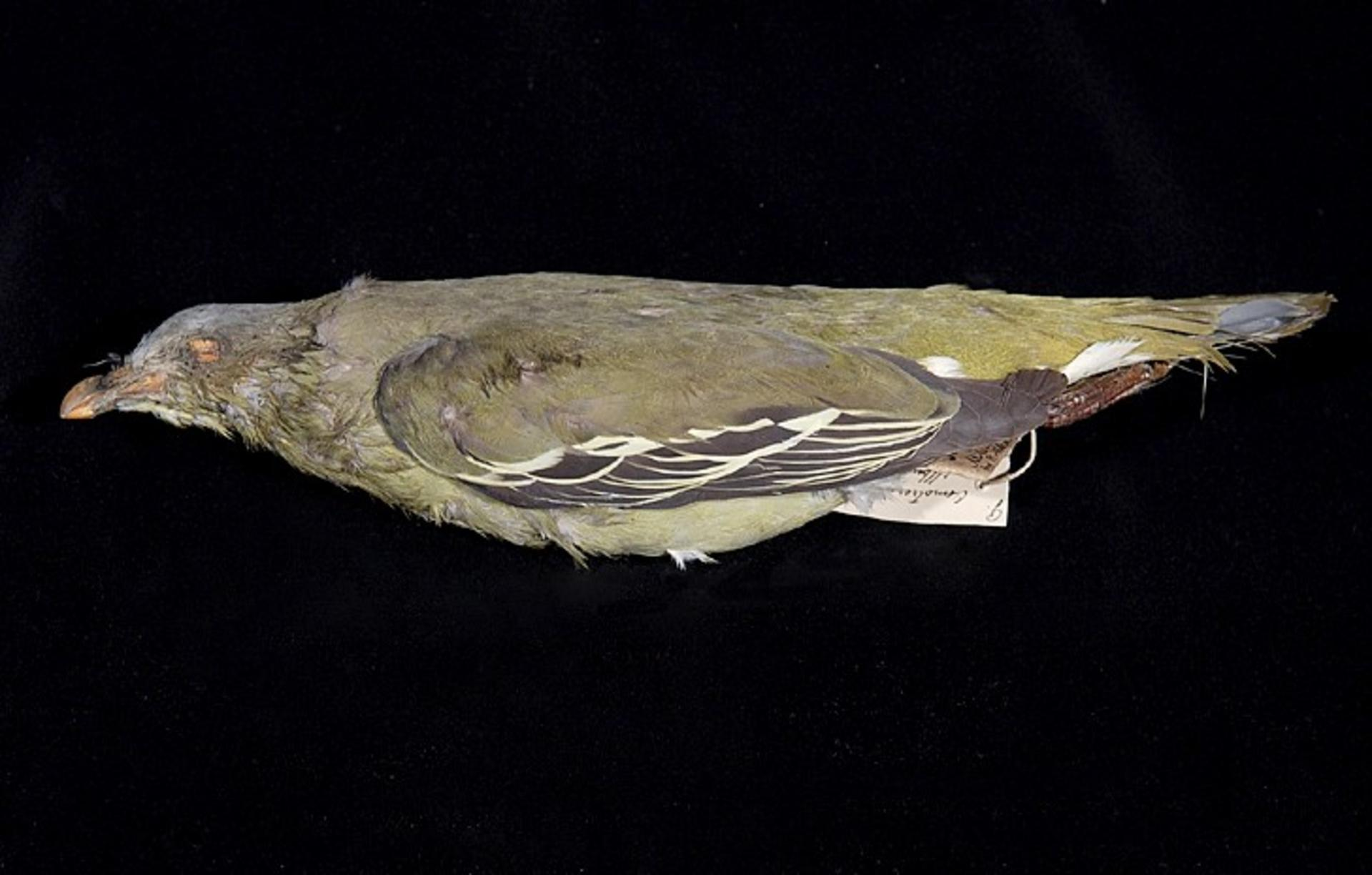

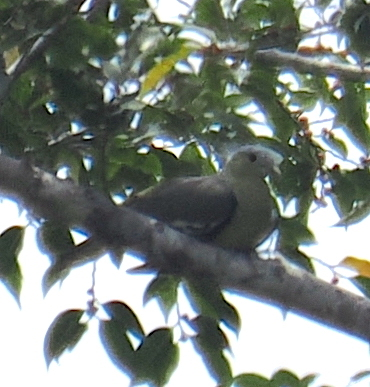

Conservation status
- Vulnerable (IUCN 3.1)

Scientific classification
- Kingdom: Animalia
- Phylum: Chordata
- Class: Aves
- Order: Columbiformes
- Family: Columbidae
- Genus: Treron
- Species: T. floris

Binomial name
- Treron floris Wallace, 1864

= Flores green pigeon =

Species of bird

The Flores green pigeon (Treron floris) is a species of bird in the family Columbidae. It is endemic to the Lesser Sunda Islands of Indonesia and occur on the islands Lombok, Sumbawa, Flores, Solor, Lembata, Pantar and Alor.

Its natural habitats are subtropical or tropical dry forests, subtropical or tropical moist lowland forests, and dry savanna. It is threatened by habitat loss.

The Flores green pigeon feeds primarily on fruit and therefore a forest habitat is essential for its survival. Its relatively small population qualifies this species to be categorized as a "Vulnerable" one. While hunting poses somewhat of a threat to the Flores green pigeon, its primary threat remains as the loss of habitat due to the burning of vegetation during the dry season.
