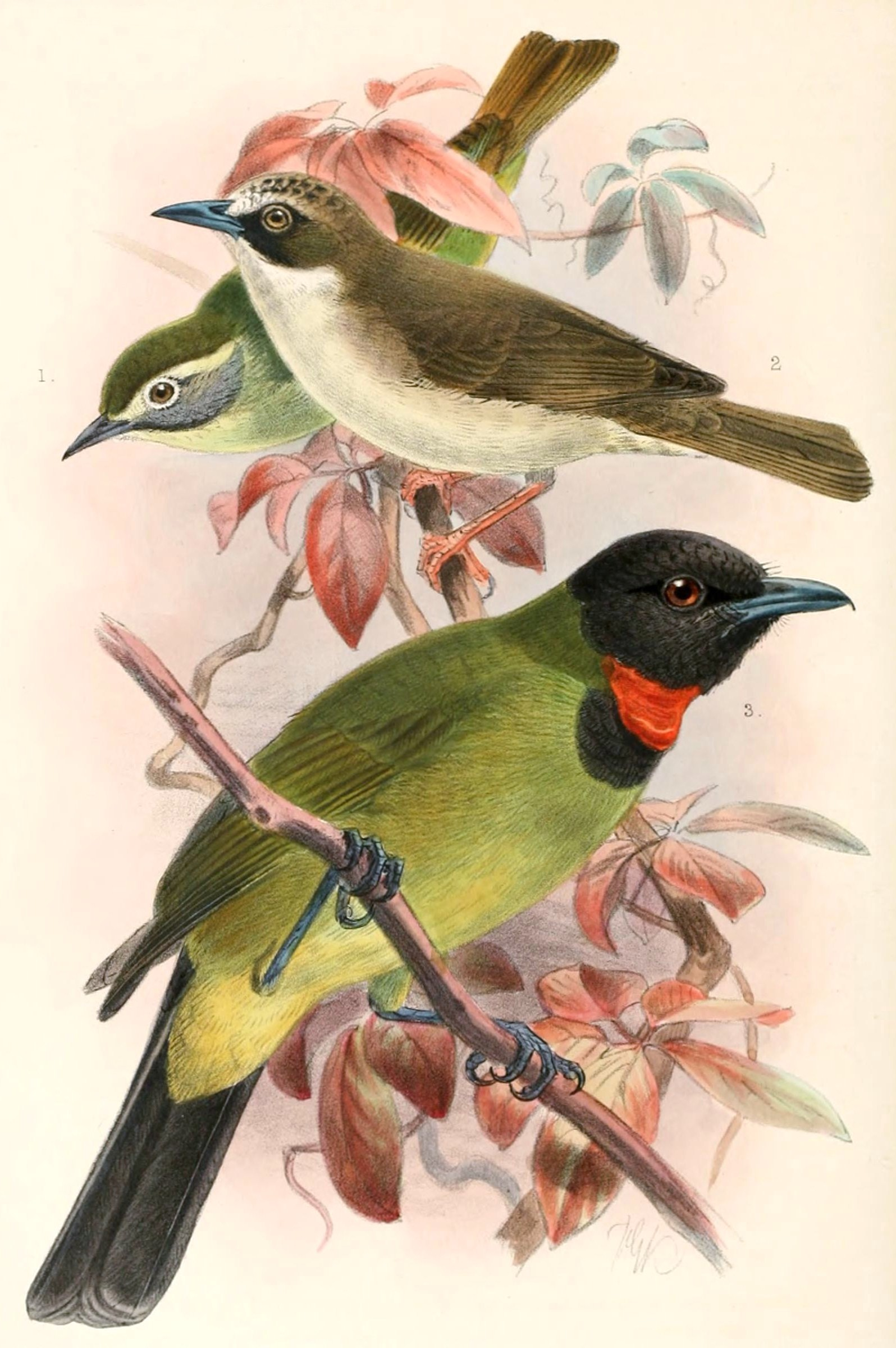
- 1. Lophozosterops superciliaris; 2. Heleia crassirostris; 3. Pachycephala nudigula
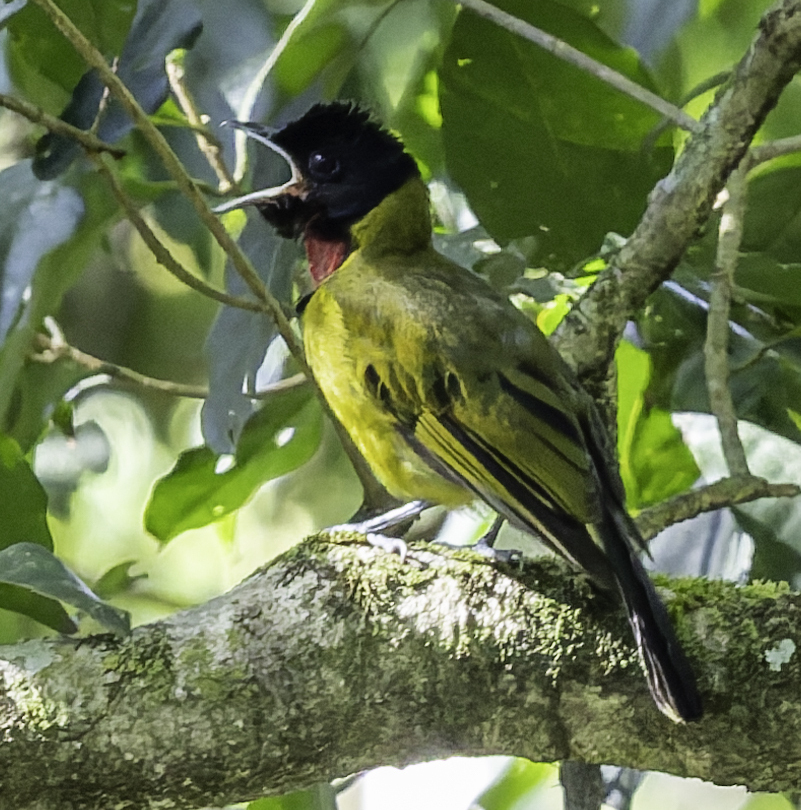

Conservation status
- Least Concern (IUCN 3.1)

Scientific classification
- Kingdom: Animalia
- Phylum: Chordata
- Class: Aves
- Order: Passeriformes
- Family: Pachycephalidae
- Genus: Pachycephala
- Species: P. nudigula

Binomial name
- Pachycephala nudigula Hartert, 1897

Subspecies
- See text

= Bare-throated whistler =

Species of bird

The bare-throated whistler (Pachycephala nudigula) is a species of bird in the family Pachycephalidae. It is endemic to the Lesser Sundas.

== Taxonomy and systematics ==
Alternate names for the bare-throated whistler include the Lesser Sunda whistler and Sunda whistler. The latter name is shared with the fawn-breasted whistler.

=== Subspecies ===
Two subspecies are recognized:

- P. n. ilsa – Rensch, 1928: Sumbawa
- P. n. nudigula – Hartert, 1897: Flores

== Habitat ==
Its natural habitats are subtropical or tropical dry forests, subtropical or tropical moist lowland forests, and subtropical or tropical moist montane forests.
