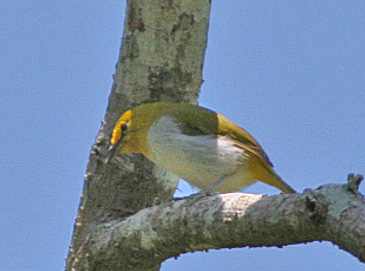

Conservation status
- Least Concern (IUCN 3.1)

Scientific classification
- Kingdom: Animalia
- Phylum: Chordata
- Class: Aves
- Order: Passeriformes
- Family: Zosteropidae
- Genus: Heleia
- Species: H. wallacei

Binomial name
- Heleia wallacei (Finsch, 1901)

Synonyms
- Zosterops wallacei

= Yellow-spectacled heleia =

Species of bird

The yellow-spectacled heleia (Heleia wallacei), also known as the yellow-ringed white-eye is a species of bird in the white-eye family of Zosteropidae. It is found in the Lesser Sunda Islands.

Its natural habitat is subtropical or tropical moist lowland forest.
