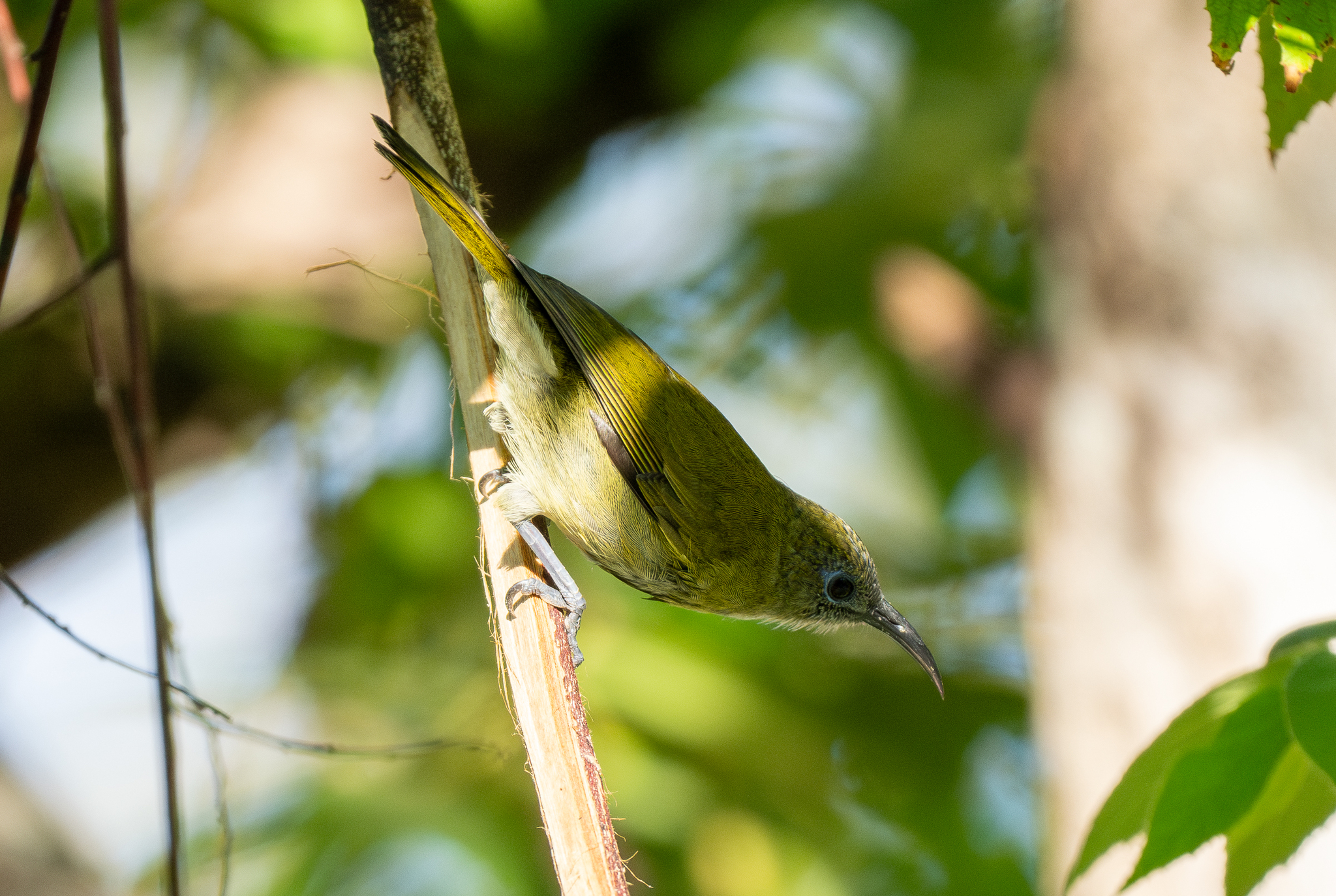

Conservation status
- Least Concern (IUCN 3.1)

Scientific classification
- Kingdom: Animalia
- Phylum: Chordata
- Class: Aves
- Order: Passeriformes
- Family: Meliphagidae
- Genus: Lichmera
- Species: L. lombokia

Binomial name
- Lichmera lombokia (Mathews, 1926)

Synonyms
- Ptilotis virescens; Lichmera lombokia

= Scaly-crowned honeyeater =

Species of bird

The scaly-crowned honeyeater (Lichmera lombokia) is a species of bird in the family Meliphagidae. It is endemic to Indonesia, where it occurs in the Lesser Sunda Islands. Its natural habitats are subtropical or tropical moist lowland forests and subtropical or tropical moist montane forests.
