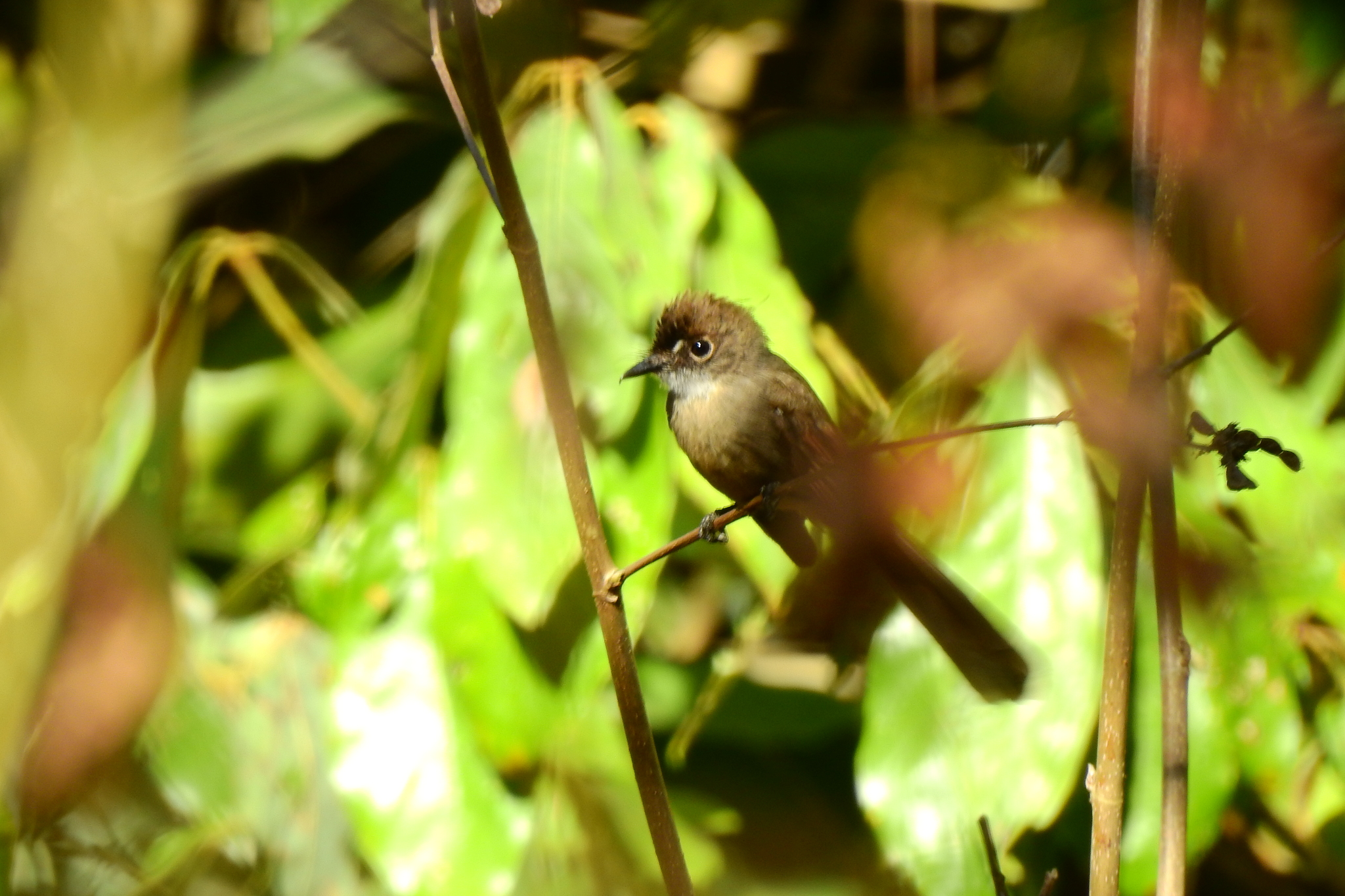

Conservation status
- Least Concern (IUCN 3.1)

Scientific classification
- Kingdom: Animalia
- Phylum: Chordata
- Class: Aves
- Order: Passeriformes
- Family: Rhipiduridae
- Genus: Rhipidura
- Species: R. diluta

Binomial name
- Rhipidura diluta Wallace, 1864

= Brown-capped fantail =

Species of bird

The brown-capped fantail (Rhipidura diluta) is a species of bird in the family Rhipiduridae. It is found in the Lesser Sunda Islands (Sumbawa and Flores).

Its natural habitats are subtropical or tropical moist lowland forests and subtropical or tropical moist montane forests.
