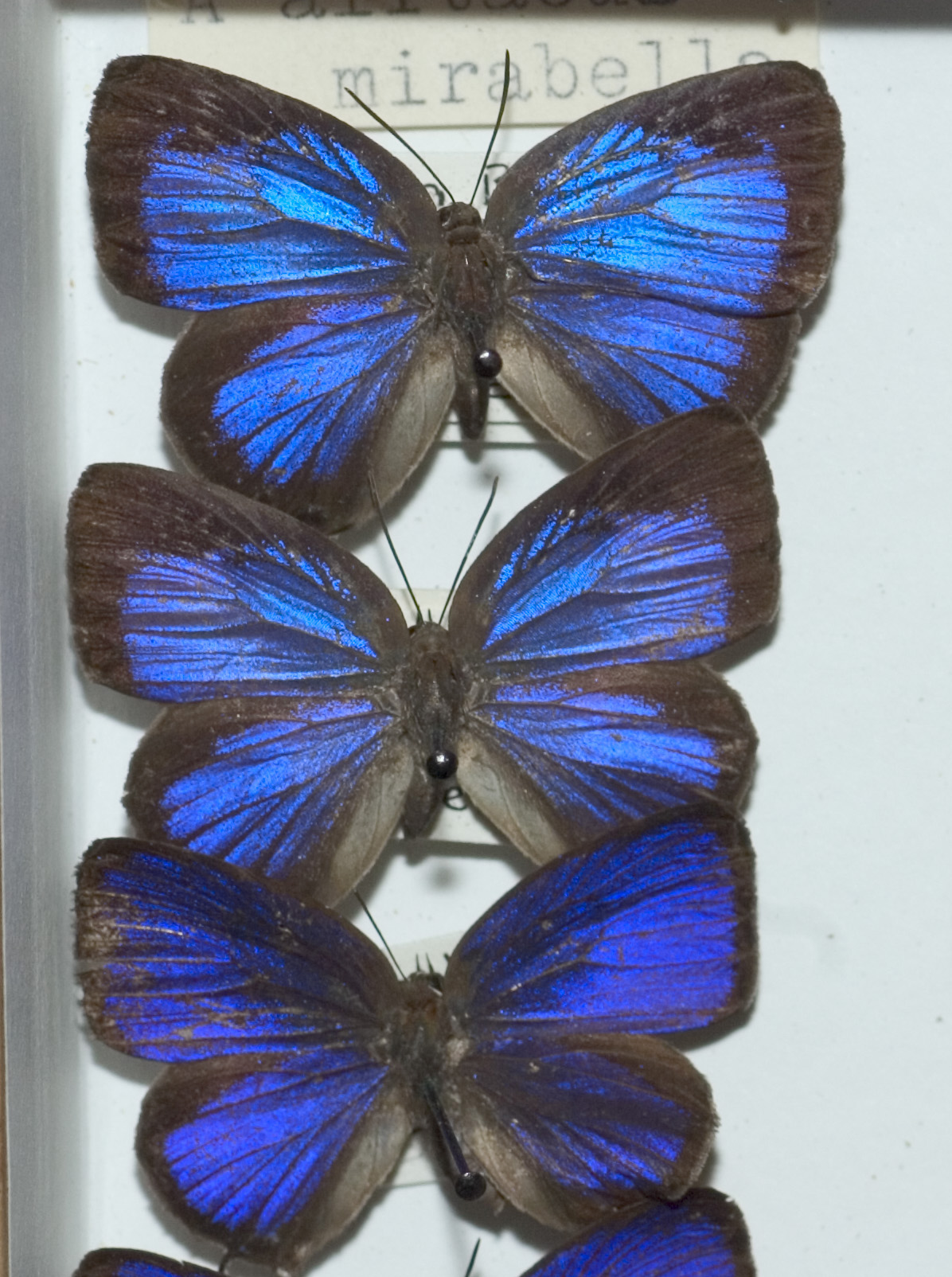
- Arhopala alitaeus mirabella

Scientific classification
- Kingdom: Animalia
- Phylum: Arthropoda
- Clade: Pancrustacea
- Class: Insecta
- Order: Lepidoptera
- Family: Lycaenidae
- Genus: Arhopala
- Species: A. alitaeus

Binomial name
- Arhopala alitaeus (Hewitson, 1862)

Synonyms
- Amblypodia alitaeus Hewitson, 1862; Narathura alitaeus Hewitson, 1862; Arhopala mirabella Doherty, 1889; Arhopala valika Corbet, 1941; Arhopala pardenas Corbet, 1941; Amblypodia myrtale Staudinger, 1889; Narathura mindanensis Bethune-Baker, 1903; Arhopala panta (Evans, 1957); Arhopala nishiyamai (Hayashi, 1981)

= Arhopala alitaeus =

Purple broken-band oakblue

Species of butterfly

Arhopala alitaeus or purple broken-band oakblue, is a butterfly of the family Lycaenidae. It is found in Asia (see subspecies section).

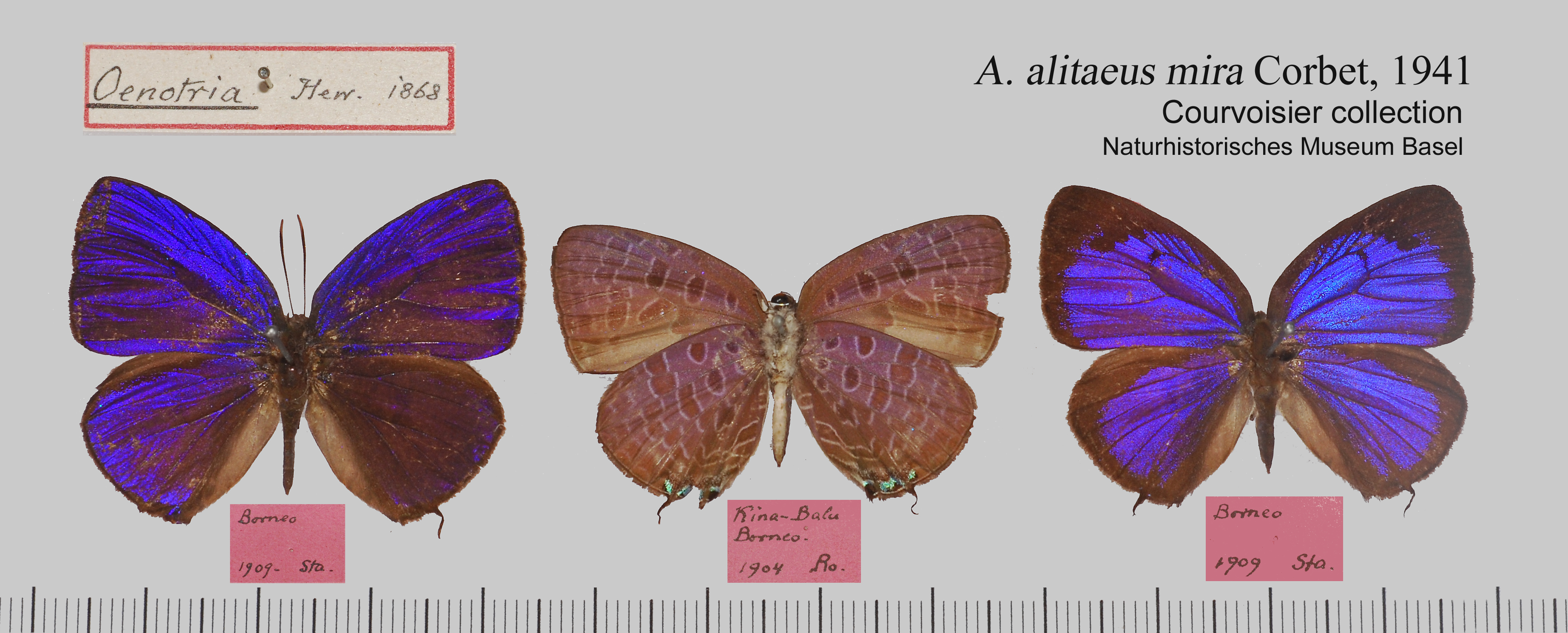
Arhopala alitaeus mira

Arhopala alitaeusis a relatively small species, the upper surface is not lilac but more dark blue and it has not such an intense metallic gloss. The underside shows beneath dark brown spots and bands on the greyish-brown ground; all the markings are distinctly defined by white.

== Subspecies ==
- A. a. alitaeus (Sulawesi, Banggai)
- A. a. mirabella (Burma, Mergui, Thailand, Langkawi)
- A. a. pardenas (Peninsular Malaya, Singapore)
- A. a. myrtale (Palawan)
- A. a. mindanensis Philippines (Mindanao)
- A. a. zilensis (Basilan)
- A. a. shigeae (Philippines)
