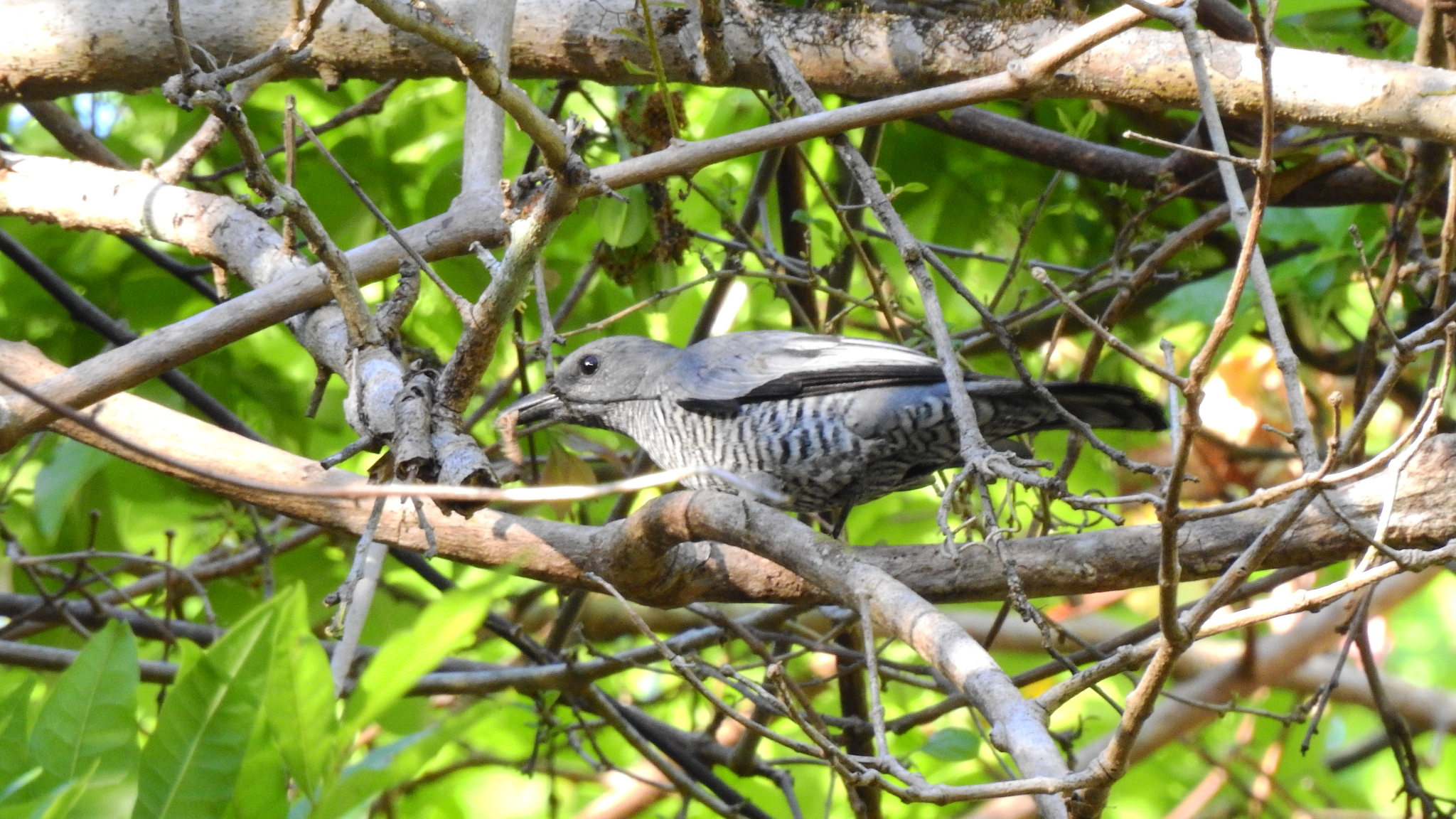

Conservation status
- Least Concern (IUCN 3.1)

Scientific classification
- Kingdom: Animalia
- Phylum: Chordata
- Class: Aves
- Order: Passeriformes
- Family: Campephagidae
- Genus: Edolisoma
- Species: E. dohertyi

Binomial name
- Edolisoma dohertyi Hartert, 1896

Synonyms
- Coracina dohertyi

= Pale-shouldered cicadabird =

Species of bird

The pale-shouldered cicadabird or Sumba cicadabird (Edolisoma dohertyi) is a species of bird in the family Campephagidae. It is endemic to the Lesser Sunda Islands of Indonesia. Its natural habitats are subtropical or tropical moist lowland forest and subtropical or tropical moist montane forest.
