= Crested heleia =

Crested white-eye

Conservation status
- Least Concern (IUCN 3.1)

Scientific classification
- Kingdom: Animalia
- Phylum: Chordata
- Class: Aves
- Order: Passeriformes
- Family: Zosteropidae
- Genus: Heleia
- Species: H. dohertyi

Binomial name
- Heleia dohertyi (Hartert, 1896)

Synonyms
- Lophozosterops dohertyi

Species of bird

The crested heleia (Heleia dohertyi), also known as the crested ibon or crested white-eye, is a species of bird in the white-eye family Zosteropidae. It is endemic to the Lesser Sunda Islands (Sumbawa and Flores).

Its natural habitats are subtropical or tropical moist lowland forest and subtropical or tropical moist montane forest.
