= Thick-billed heleia =

Conservation status
- Least Concern (IUCN 3.1)

Scientific classification
- Kingdom: Animalia
- Phylum: Chordata
- Class: Aves
- Order: Passeriformes
- Family: Zosteropidae
- Genus: Heleia
- Species: H. crassirostris

Binomial name
- Heleia crassirostris (Hartert, 1897)

Species of bird

The thick-billed heleia (Heleia crassirostris), also known as the Flores white-eye, is a species of bird in the family Zosteropidae. It is found in the Indonesian islands of Sumbawa and Flores. Its natural habitats are subtropical or tropical dry forest, subtropical or tropical moist lowland forest, and subtropical or tropical moist montane forest.
