= Eyebrowed heleia =

Conservation status
- Least Concern (IUCN 3.1)

Scientific classification
- Kingdom: Animalia
- Phylum: Chordata
- Class: Aves
- Order: Passeriformes
- Family: Zosteropidae
- Genus: Heleia
- Species: H. superciliaris

Binomial name
- Heleia superciliaris (Hartert, 1897)

Synonyms
- Zosterops superciliaris

Species of bird

The eyebrowed heleia (Heleia superciliaris), also known as the cream-browed white-eye, cream-browed ibon or yellow-browed white-eye, is a species of bird in the white-eye family Zosteropidae. It is endemic to the Lesser Sunda Islands. Its natural habitat is subtropical or tropical moist montane forest.
