= Bornean mountain whistler =

Bornean mountain whistler may refer to:

- Bornean whistler, a species of bird endemic to the island of Borneo
- Rusty whistler, a species of bird endemic to New Guinea
