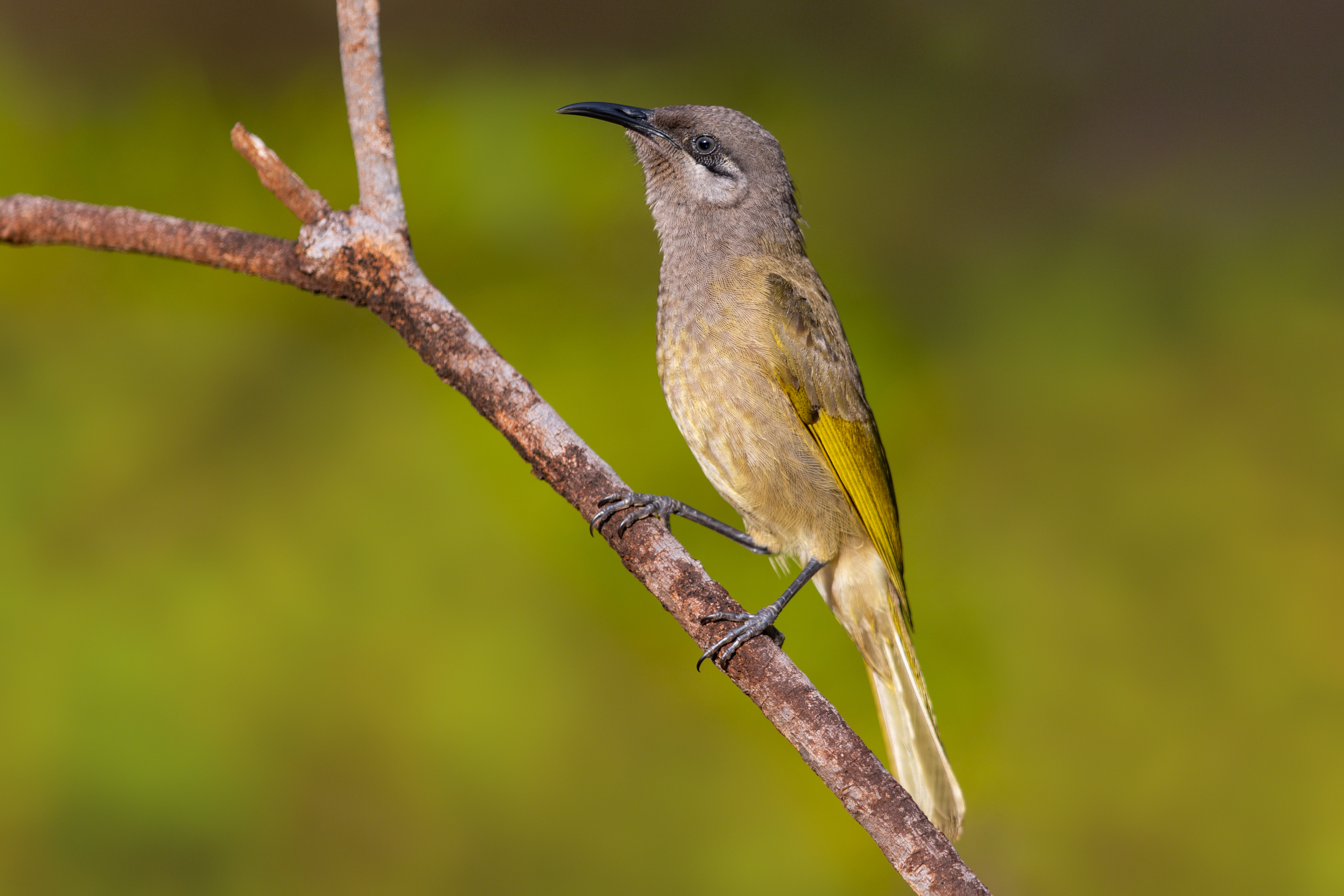

Conservation status
- Least Concern (IUCN 3.1)

Scientific classification
- Kingdom: Animalia
- Phylum: Chordata
- Class: Aves
- Order: Passeriformes
- Family: Meliphagidae
- Genus: Lichmera
- Species: L. incana

Binomial name
- Lichmera incana (Latham, 1790)

= Grey-eared honeyeater =

Species of bird

The grey-eared honeyeater (Lichmera incana), also known as the dark-brown honeyeater, is a passerine bird of the honeyeater family which is found in Vanuatu and New Caledonia in the south-west Pacific. It is sometimes known as the silver-eared honeyeater, but this name is also used for the silver-eared honeyeater (Lichmera alboauricularis) of New Guinea.

== Description ==
The grey-eared honeyeater is 13 to 17 cm long with the males being larger than the females. The plumage is mainly dull green-brown above and grey with an olive tint below. The cheeks are silvery-grey, and the crown is dark grey. The black bill is long and slightly downcurved; the legs and feet are blue-grey. Juveniles are paler than the adults without the silvery cheeks.

They are noisy birds which begin calling before dawn. They have a harsh tchoo-tchoo-tchoo call and a warbling song.

== Distribution and habitat ==
It is a common bird across most of its range and occurs in the lowlands and low hills in a variety of habitats, including forest, scrub, mangroves, and gardens. There are five subspecies; the nominate subspecies L. i. incana is found on Grande Terre, the main island of New Caledonia. L. i. poliotis and L. i. mareensis are found on the Loyalty Islands to the north-east of New Caledonia. L. i. flavotincta and L. i. griseoviridis occur in Vanuatu.

== Behaviour ==
=== Feeding ===
Grey-eared honeyeaters feed from the shrub layer up to the canopy, moving from branch to branch in search of flowers from which they take nectar and pollen. They also feed on insects and spiders, searching among leaves or making short flights into the air to catch them. They will sometimes hover in front of flowers or spider webs looking for food.

=== Reproduction ===
The breeding season usually lasts from October to February. The nest is made mainly of grass and plant fibres, held together by spider webs. It is built in the fork of a branch in a tree or bush. Two eggs are laid; these are white with a few reddish spots and are incubated for 14 days. The young birds are fed on insects and spiders and leave the nest after 12 days.
