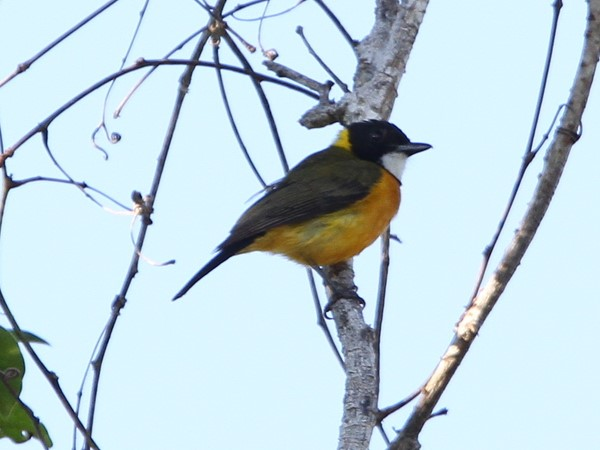

Conservation status
- Least Concern (IUCN 3.1)

Scientific classification
- Kingdom: Animalia
- Phylum: Chordata
- Class: Aves
- Order: Passeriformes
- Family: Pachycephalidae
- Genus: Pachycephala
- Species: P. calliope

Binomial name
- Pachycephala calliope Bonaparte, 1850

Synonyms
- Pachycephala pectoralis fulvotincta

= Tenggara whistler =

Species of bird

The Tenggara whistler (Pachycephala calliope, previously Pachycephala fulvotincta), also known as the fulvous-tinted whistler and the rusty-breasted whistler, is a species of bird in the family Pachycephalidae. It is endemic to Indonesia, where it ranges from Java east to Alor and north to the Selayar Islands.

== Taxonomy and systematics ==
The Tenggara whistler is variably considered as either a subspecies of the widespread Australian golden whistler or treated as a separate species, but strong published evidence in favour of either treatment is limited, and further study is warranted to resolve the complex taxonomic situation. The name 'rusty-breasted whistler' was also used as an alternate name for the rusty whistler. With the transfer of the subspecies calliope from the yellow-throated whistler to the Tenggara whistler, on the basis of priority the scientific name changed from Pachycephala fulvotincta Wallace, 1864 to Pachycephala calliope Bonaparte, 1850.

Five subspecies are recognised:

- P. c. everetti Hartert, EJO, 1896 – Tanahjampea, Kalaotoa and Madu (southeast of southwest Sulawesi)
- P. c. javana Hartert, EJO, 1928 – east Java and Bali
- P. c. fulvotincta Wallace, 1864 – Sumbawa to Alor Island (west, central Lesser Sunda Islands)
- P. c. fulviventris Hartert, EJO, 1896 – Sumba (central south Lesser Sunda Islands)
- P. c. calliope Bonaparte, 1850 – Timor, Semau and Wetar (east Lesser Sunda Islands)

The Selayar whistler (Pachycephala teysmanni) was formerly considered as a subspecies.

== Description ==
Compared to other members of the golden whistler group, the Tenggara whistler is relatively small, and males have a white throat and a rust-tinged chest, except in the subspecies teysmanni from Selayar Islands where the plumage of the male is female-like.

== Distribution and habitat ==
It is the westernmost member of the golden whistler group, being bordered to the east by the black-chinned and yellow-throated whistlers, and to the south by the Australian golden whistler.
