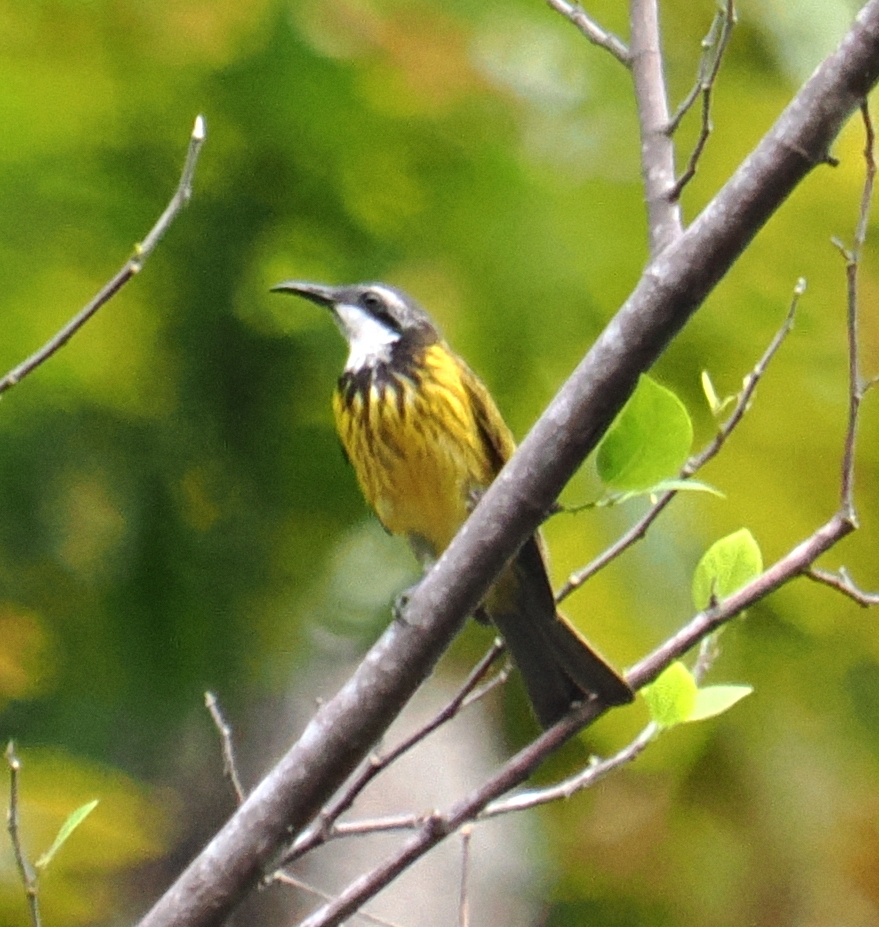

Conservation status
- Least Concern (IUCN 3.1)

Scientific classification
- Kingdom: Animalia
- Phylum: Chordata
- Class: Aves
- Order: Passeriformes
- Family: Meliphagidae
- Genus: Lichmera
- Species: L. notabilis

Binomial name
- Lichmera notabilis (Finsch, 1898)

= Black-necklaced honeyeater =

Species of bird

The black-necklaced honeyeater or black-chested honeyeater (Lichmera notabilis) is a species of bird in the family Meliphagidae. It is endemic to Wetar.

Its natural habitats are subtropical or tropical moist lowland forests, subtropical or tropical moist shrubland, and rural gardens. It is threatened by habitat loss.

== Taxonomy ==
The black-necklaced honeyeater was first described by in 1898 by naturalist Otto Finsch with the name Stigmatops notabilis. Today, it placed in the genus Lichmera, from Ancient Greek meaning "licking with the tongue", as Lichmera notabilis. It has no subspecies.
