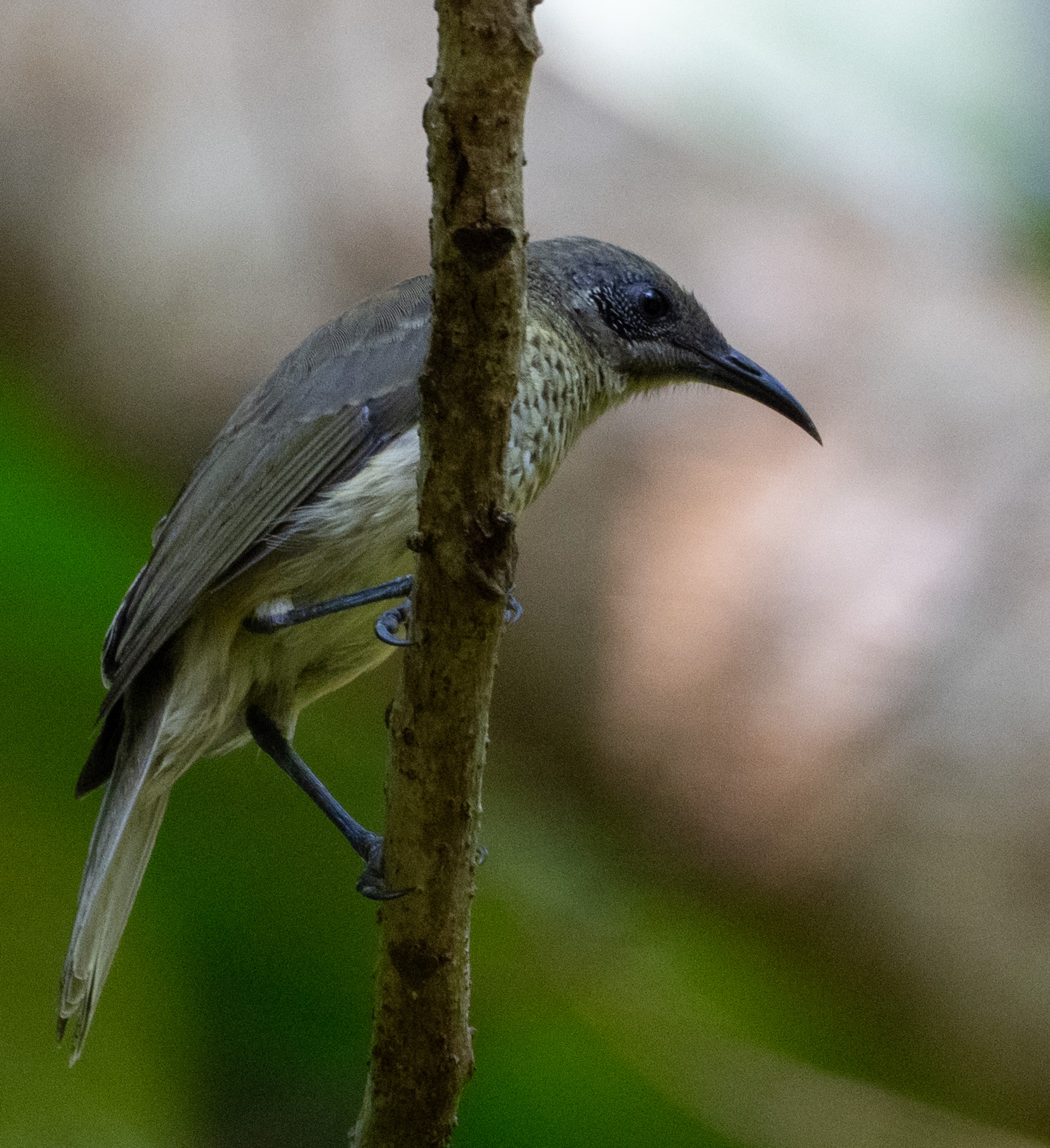

Conservation status
- Least Concern (IUCN 3.1)

Scientific classification
- Kingdom: Animalia
- Phylum: Chordata
- Class: Aves
- Order: Passeriformes
- Family: Meliphagidae
- Genus: Lichmera
- Species: L. squamata

Binomial name
- Lichmera squamata (Salvadori, 1878)

= Scaly-breasted honeyeater =

Species of bird

The scaly-breasted honeyeater (Lichmera squamata), also known as the white-tufted honeyeater, is a species of bird in the family Meliphagidae. It is endemic to Indonesia, where it occurs in the southern Moluccas. Its natural habitats are subtropical or tropical dry forests, subtropical or tropical moist lowland forests, and subtropical or tropical mangrove forests.
