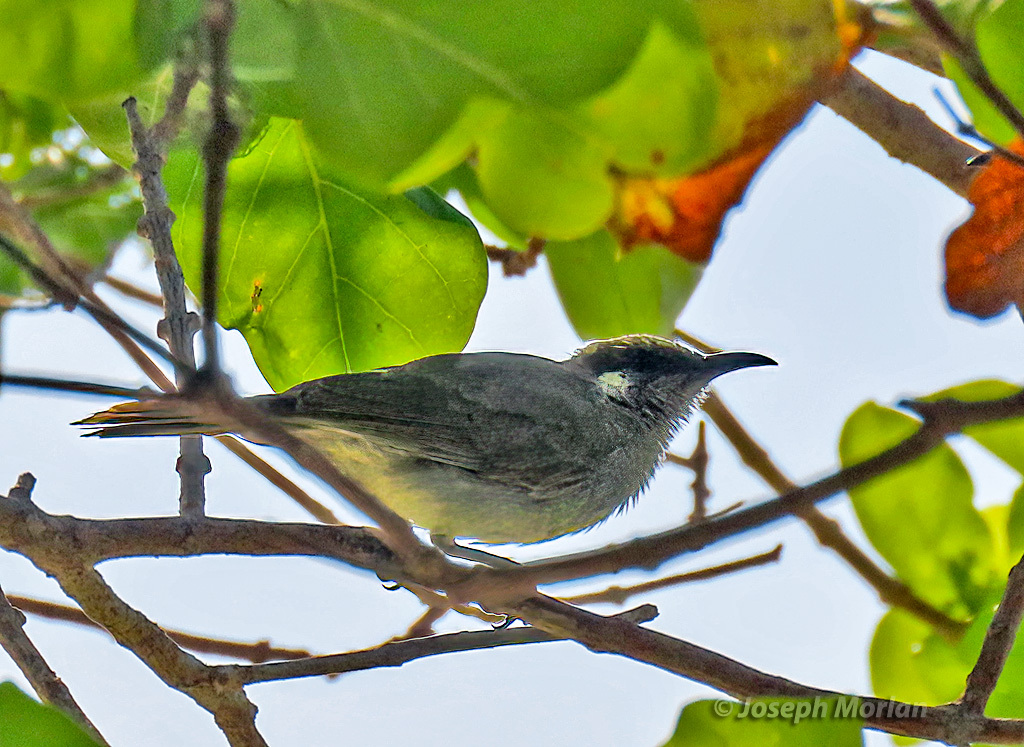

Conservation status
- Least Concern (IUCN 3.1)

Scientific classification
- Kingdom: Animalia
- Phylum: Chordata
- Class: Aves
- Order: Passeriformes
- Family: Meliphagidae
- Genus: Lichmera
- Species: L. argentauris

Binomial name
- Lichmera argentauris (Finsch, 1871)

= Olive honeyeater =

Species of bird

The olive honeyeater (Lichmera argentauris) is a species of bird in the family Meliphagidae. It is endemic to Indonesia, where it inhabits the Maluku Islands and coastal Western New Guinea.
