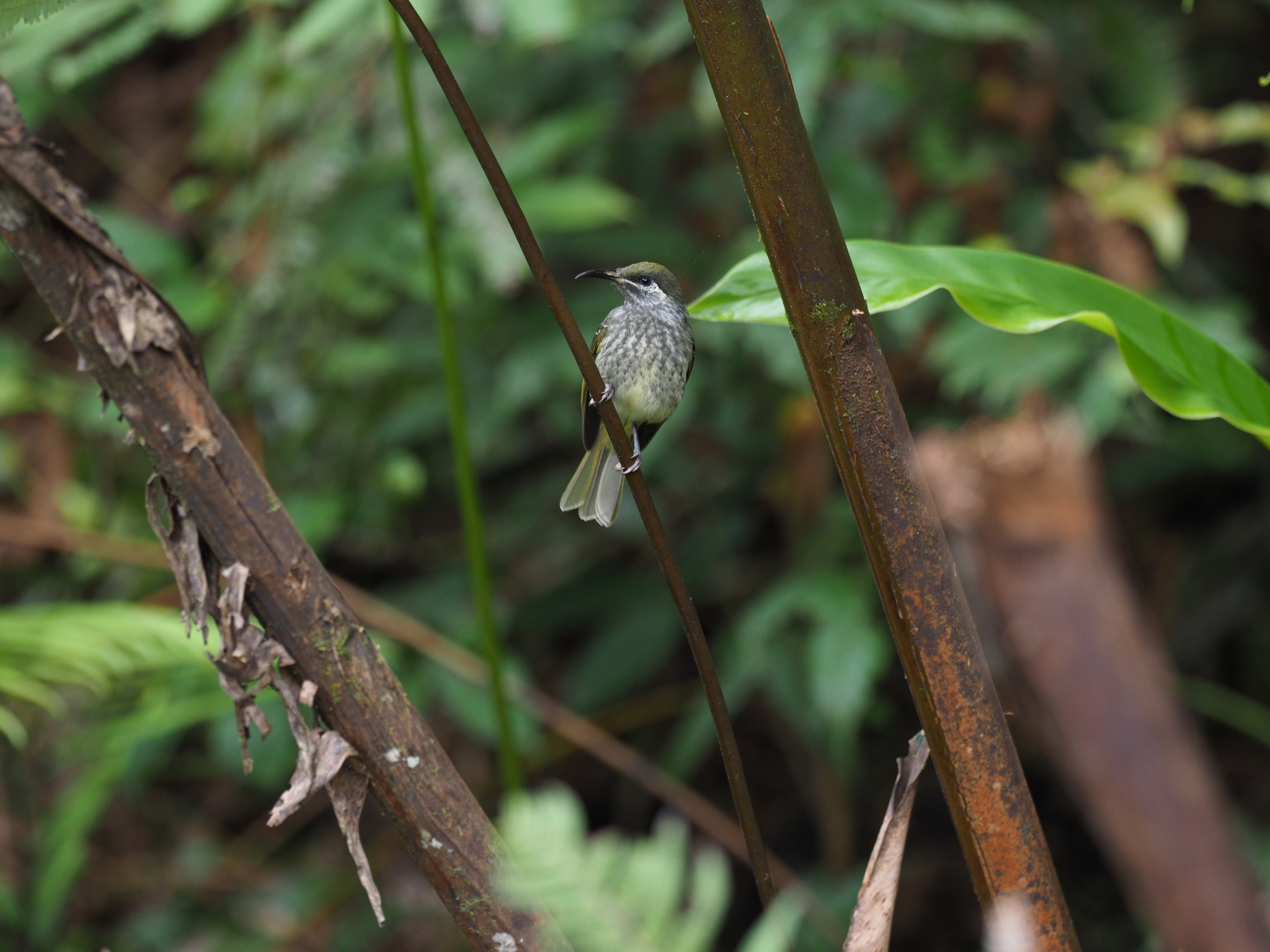

Conservation status
- Least Concern (IUCN 3.1)

Scientific classification
- Kingdom: Animalia
- Phylum: Chordata
- Class: Aves
- Order: Passeriformes
- Family: Meliphagidae
- Genus: Lichmera
- Species: L. monticola

Binomial name
- Lichmera monticola (Stresemann, 1912)

= Seram honeyeater =

Species of bird

The Seram honeyeater (Lichmera monticola) is a species of bird in the family Meliphagidae. It is endemic to Indonesia, where it occurs on Seram in the southern Maluku Islands. Its natural habitat is subtropical or tropical moist montane forests.
