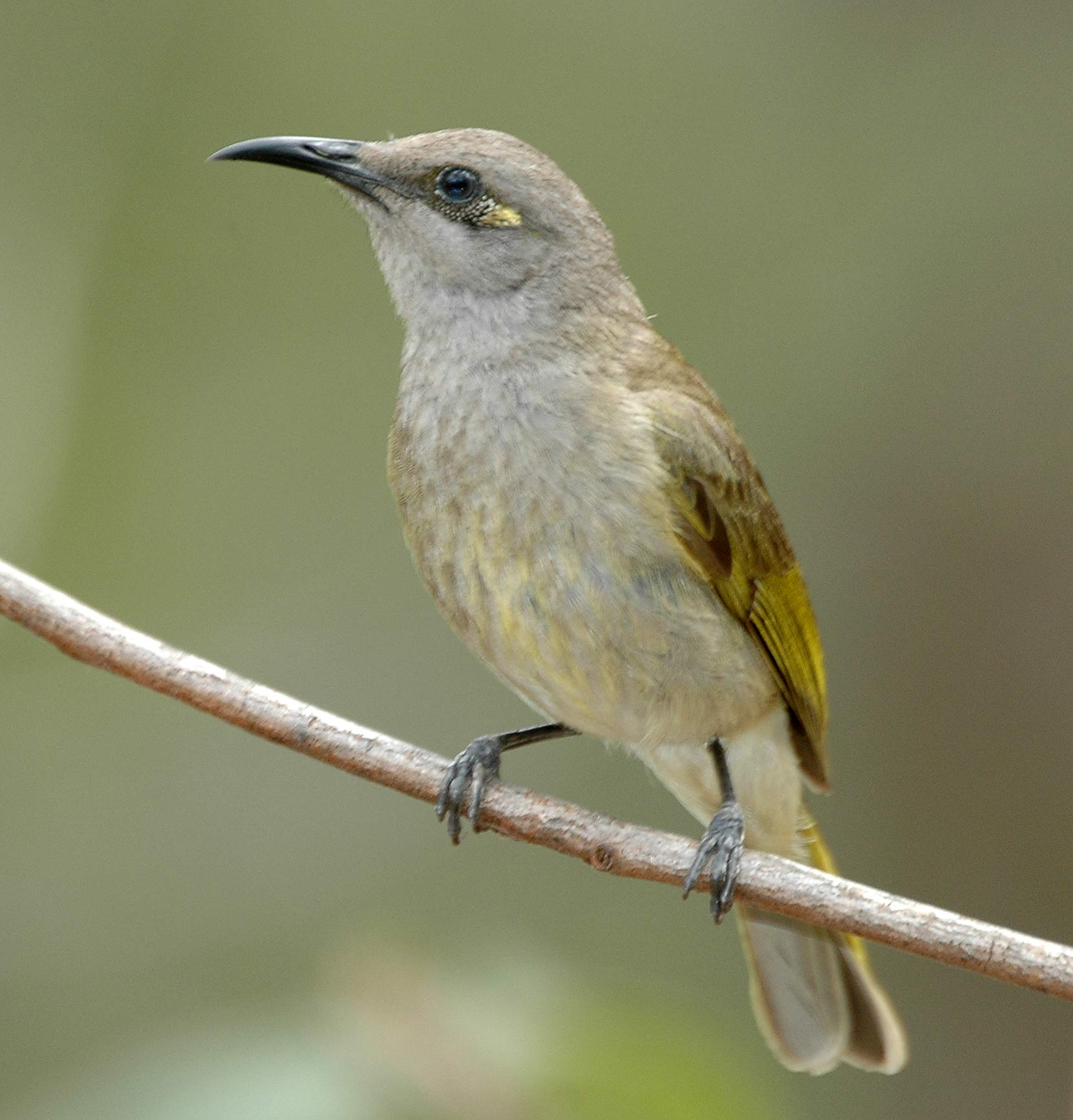
- Brown honeyeater (Lichmera indistincta)

Scientific classification
- Kingdom: Animalia
- Phylum: Chordata
- Class: Aves
- Order: Passeriformes
- Family: Meliphagidae
- Genus: Lichmera; Cabanis, 1851

Type species
- Glyciphila ocularis Gould, 1838

Species
- See text

= Lichmera =

Genus of birds

Lichmera is a genus of birds in the honeyeater family Meliphagidae that are found in Southeast Asia.

== Taxonomy ==
The genus Lichmera was introduced in 1851 by the German ornithologist Jean Cabanis. He listed two species in the new genus but did not specify a type species. In 1854 the French naturalist Charles Lucien Bonaparte designate the type as Glyciphila ocularis Gould, which is now treated as a subspecies of the brown honeyeater (Lichmera indistincta ocularis). The genus name Lichmera is from Ancient Greek λιχμηρης/likhmērēs meaning "licking with the tongue".

The genus contains nine species:

Image	Name	Common name	Distribution
	Lichmera lombokia	Scaly-crowned honeyeater	western Lesser Sunda Islands (Lombok, Sumbawa, and Flores)
	Lichmera argentauris	Olive honeyeater	Lusaolate (north of central Seram), Kekek (east of Obi Islands), Damar Island (south of Halmahera; north, central Moluccas) and islets of Raja Ampat Islands (northwest of New Guinea)
	Lichmera indistincta	Brown honeyeater	Bali, Lesser Sunda Islands, Aru Islands, central south New Guinea and west, north, central, east Australia
	Lichmera incana	Grey-eared honeyeater	central, south Vanuatu and New Caledonia including Loyalty Islands
	Lichmera alboauricularis	Silver-eared honeyeater	central north and southeast New Guinea
	Lichmera squamata	Scaly-breasted honeyeater	Wetar and Leti to Babar Islands (east Lesser Sunda Islands) and Tayandu, Kai, and Tanimbar Islands (south Moluccas)
	Lichmera deningeri	Buru honeyeater	montane Buru (central west Moluccas)
	Lichmera monticola	Seram honeyeater	montane west, central Seram (central east Moluccas)
	Lichmera flavicans	Flame-eared honeyeater	Timor (east Lesser Sunda Islands)
	Lichmera notabilis	Black-necklaced honeyeater	Wetar (east Lesser Sunda Islands)
