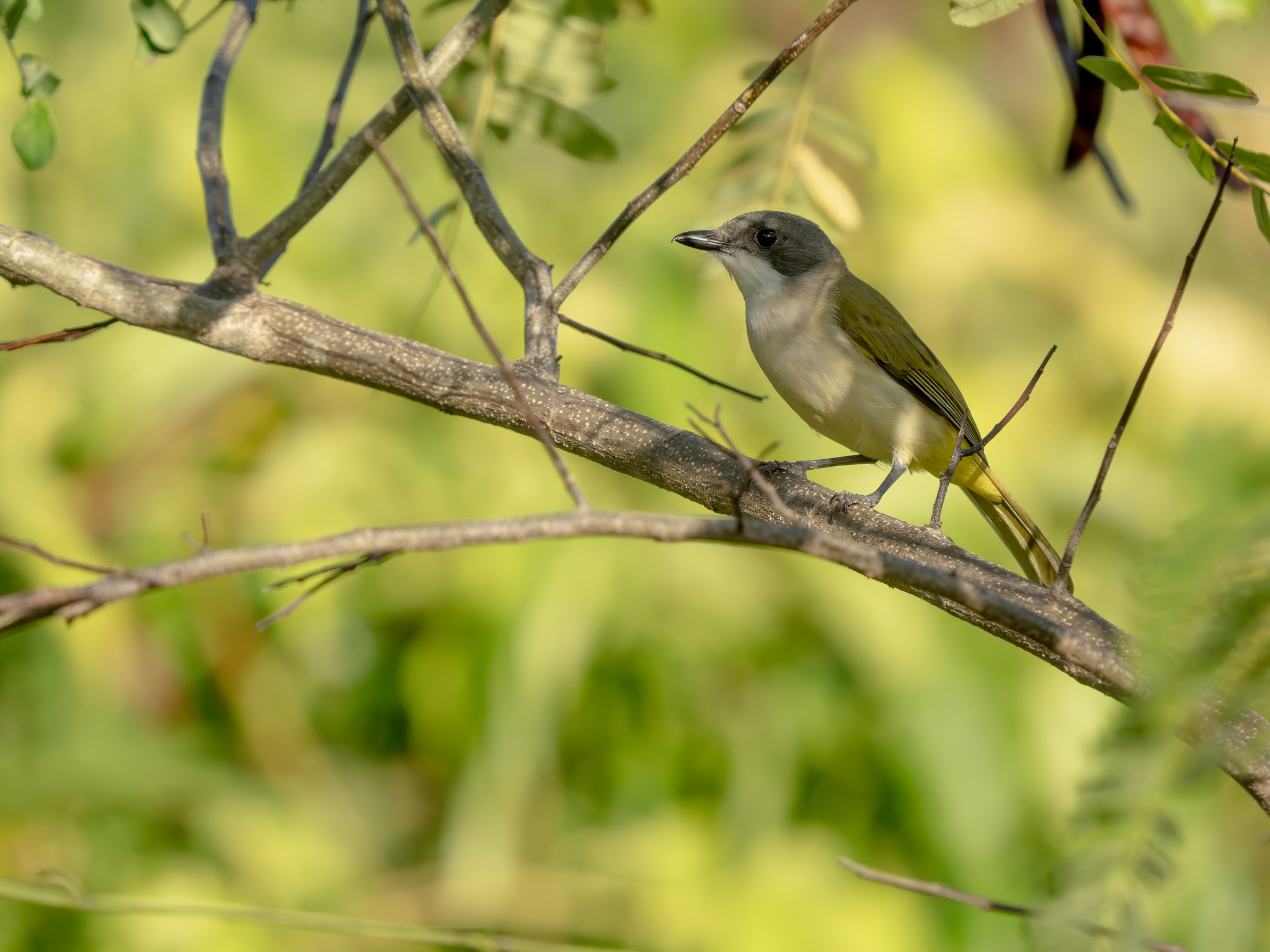
- Male
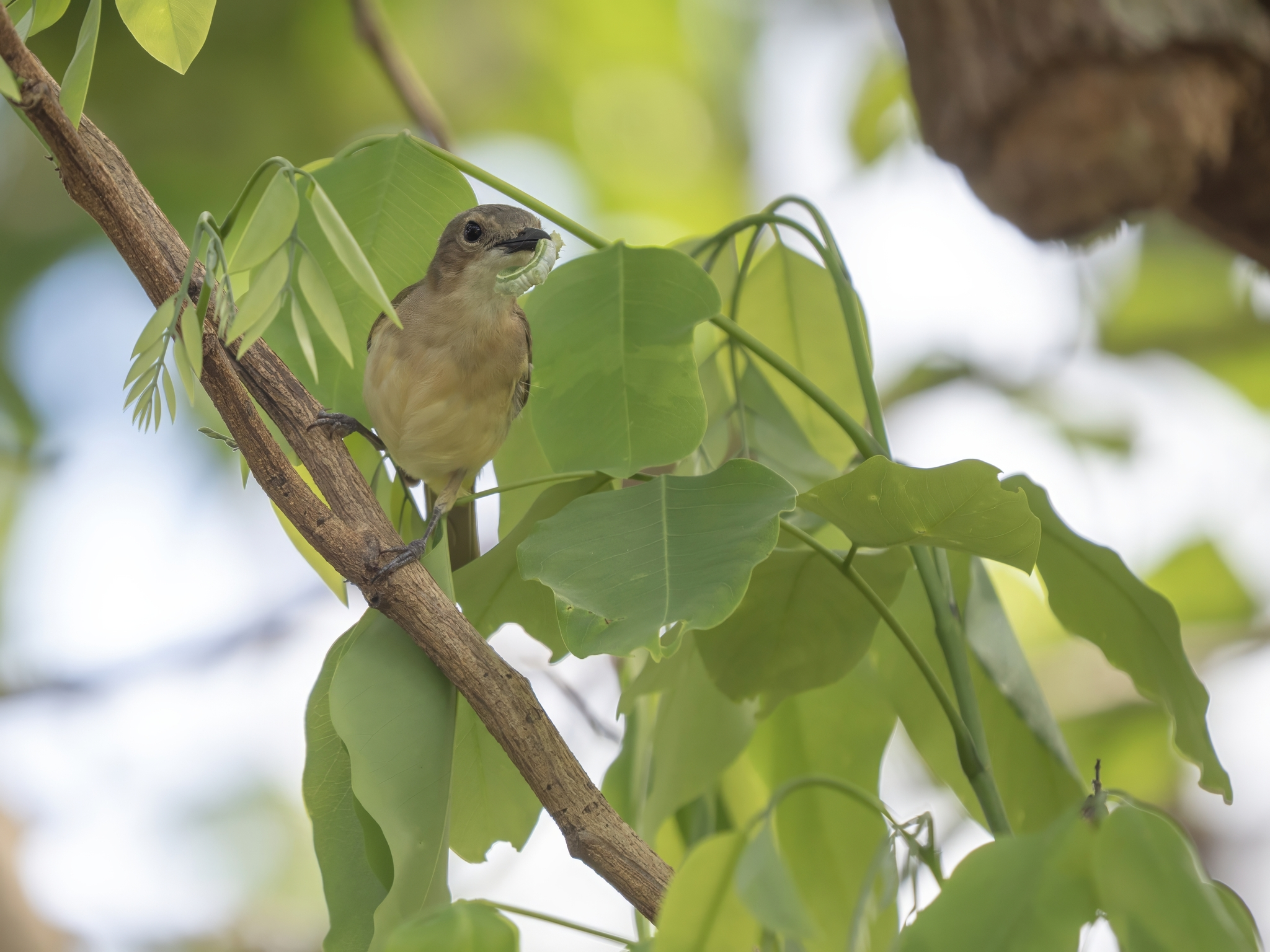
- Female

Conservation status
- Least Concern (IUCN 3.1)

Scientific classification
- Kingdom: Animalia
- Phylum: Chordata
- Class: Aves
- Order: Passeriformes
- Family: Pachycephalidae
- Genus: Pachycephala
- Species: P. teysmanni

Binomial name
- Pachycephala teysmanni Büttikofer, 1893
- Location of Selayar in Sulawesi

= Selayar whistler =

Species of bird

The Selayar whistler (Pachycephala teysmanni) is a species of songbird in the family Pachycephalidae. Described by the Swiss zoologist Johann Büttikofer in 1878, it is endemic to the Indonesian island of Selayar, off the southwestern coast of Sulawesi. After its initial description, it was long considered a subspecies of the golden whistler and later the rusty-breasted whistler, before being raised to species status again in 2016. Selayar whistlers are around 16–17 cm (6.3–6.7 in) in length. Adult males have grey heads, white throats, olive-green upperparts, pinkish underparts, and brownish-olive tail and wing feathers. Adult females are largely similar to males, but have dark ochre lores and rufous ear-coverts. The similar appearances of the sexes in this species helps differentiate it from the rusty-breasted whistler; in that species, males have black-and-yellow plumage, contrasting with the female's olive-brown colouration.

The Selayar whistler prefers forested habitats, but also occurs in shrubland, savanna, and rural gardens. Its natural history is poorly studied, but it is known to feed on invertebrates and fruit. The whistler is classified as being of least concern by the International Union for Conservation of Nature, as its population is thought to be stable and no significant threats to the species are known.

== Taxonomy ==
Selayar, an island off the coast of southwestern Sulawesi in Indonesia, was first explored ornithologically by the Dutch biologist Johannes Elias Teijsmann in 1878. Teijsmann collected several species during his expedition, including three specimens of the Selayar whistler. The Swiss zoologist Johann Büttikofer formally described the species in 1893 based on the specimens collected by Teijsmann. Büttikofer named the species Pachycephala teysmanni to honour its collector, using an alternative spelling of Teijsmann's surname. Büttikofer erroneously believed that the specimen had been collected in "Macassar, South Celebes"; the type location was corrected to Selayar by the German ornithologist Ernst Hartert in 1896.

The Selayar whistler has no subspecies. Historically, the species was considered to be a subspecies of the golden whistler (Pachycephala pectoralis), a species that also included the rusty-breasted whistler (Pachycephala calliope). The rusty-breasted whistler was later split from the golden whistler, with the Selayar whistler being considered a subspecies of the rusty-breasted whistler. In 2016, the Selayar whistler was raised to species status by Josep del Hoyo and Nigel Collar, mainly based on its sexually monomorphic plumage. Male Selayar whistlers are largely similar to females, unlike male rusty-breasted whistlers, who have black-and-yellow plumage that contrasts with the female's olive-brown colouration.

== Description ==
Adult Selayar whistlers are around 16–17 cm (6.3–6.7 in) in length. Adult males have grey heads from the crown down to the lores, ear-coverts, and nape (back of the neck), with white throats. The upperparts are olive-green, with a yellower tint on the rump, while the tail and wing feathers are brownish-olive with dark olive-green margins. The underparts are pinkish, with a yellowish hue to the belly. The iris is dark brown, the beak is black, and the legs are greyish-brown. Adult females are similar, but have dark ochre lores and rufous ear-coverts. Newly fledged males are said to be like females but with a brown wash to the upper back and brown-streaked white underparts.

The Selayar whistler's song is a short four-whistle tso-WEE-WEE-dzo. The first and last notes are descending in pitch, while the two middle notes are loud rising whistles.

== Distribution and habitat ==
The whistler is endemic to the Indonesian island of Selayar. Its habitat preferences are poorly known, but the species seems to prefer forested habitat, particularly moist lowland forests. It also inhabits shrubland, savanna, and rural gardens. It is non-migratory.

== Conservation and ecology ==
The Selayar whistler's natural history is poorly studied. Its dietary habits do not seem to vary significantly from other Pachycephala whistlers. It is thought to feed on invertebrates and fruit and can frequently be observed gleaning insects off foliage. Nothing is known of its breeding habits. The species is not thought to be threatened and is classified by the International Union for Conservation of Nature as being of least concern. It is thought to have a stable population and faces no significant threats, although it has been reported being trafficked in the Indonesian songbird trade. A 1995 survey found the species to be common in secondary forest and other disturbed habitats.
