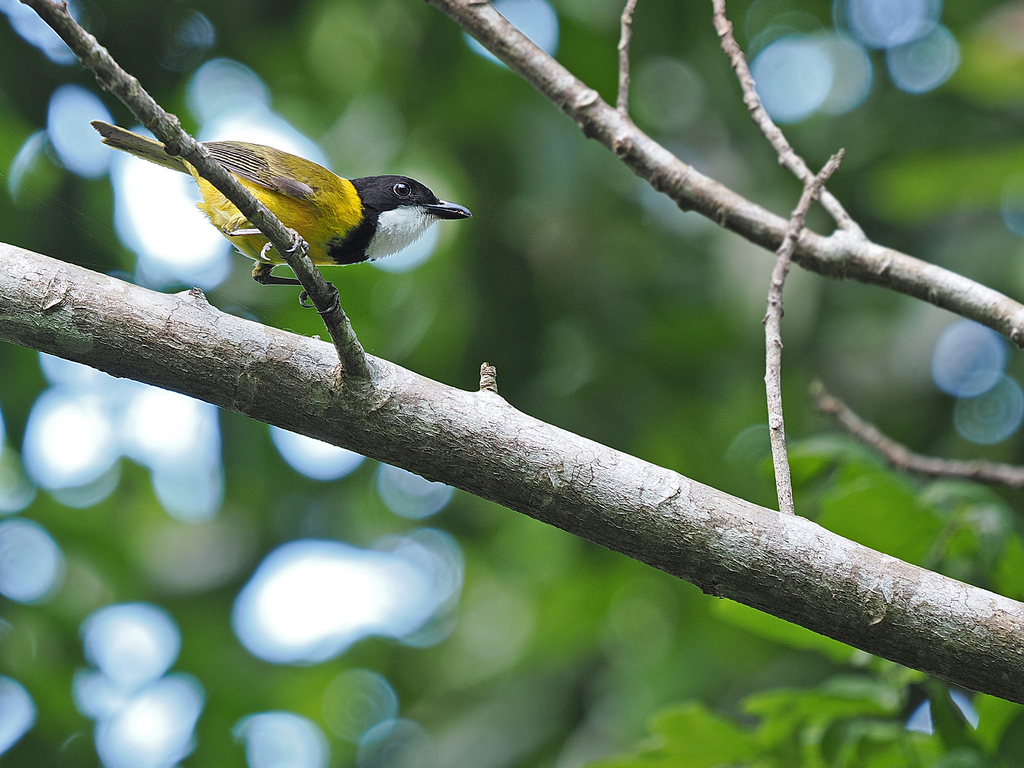

Conservation status
- Not evaluated (IUCN 3.1)

Scientific classification
- Kingdom: Animalia
- Phylum: Chordata
- Class: Aves
- Order: Passeriformes
- Family: Pachycephalidae
- Genus: Pachycephala
- Species: P. sharpei

Binomial name
- Pachycephala sharpei Meyer, AB, 1884

= Babar whistler =

Species of bird

The Babar whistler (Pachycephala sharpei) is a passerine bird in the family Pachycephalidae that is endemic to the island of Babar which lies at the eastern end of the Lesser Sunda Islands. It was formerly treated as a subspecies of the yellow-throated whistler.

== Taxonomy ==
The Babar whistler was formally described in 1884 by the German naturalist Adolf Bernhard Meyer based on a specimen collected on the island of Babar in Indonesia. He coined the binomial name Pachycephala sharpei where the specific epithet was chosen to honour the English ornithologist Richard Bowdler Sharpe. The Babar whistler was formerly classified as a subspecies of the yellow-throated whistler (Pachycephala macrorhyncha) but is now considered to be a separate species based on the deep genetic divergence, morphology, and distinct female plumage. The species is monotypic: no subspecies are recognised.
