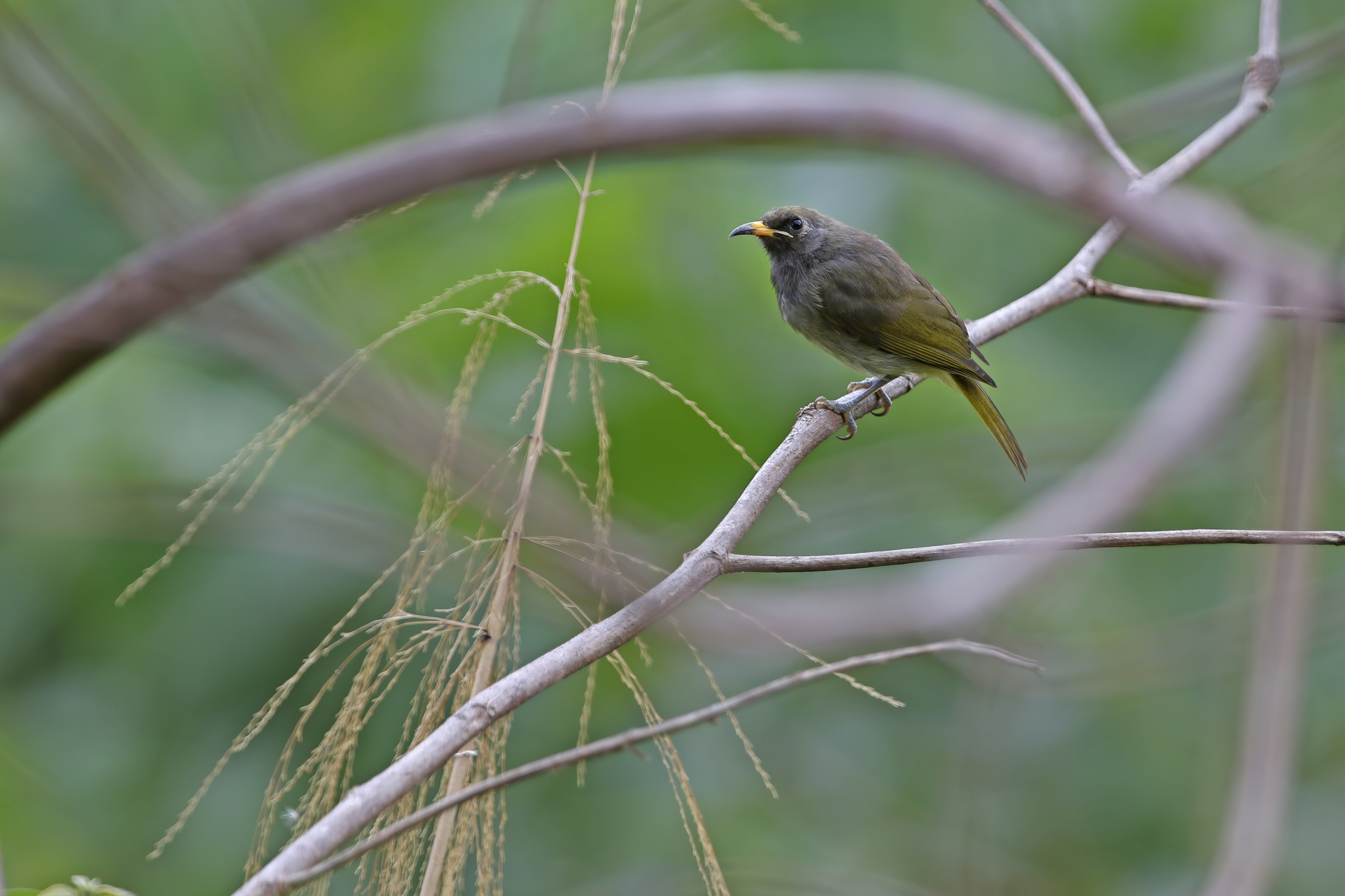

Conservation status
- Least Concern (IUCN 3.1)

Scientific classification
- Kingdom: Animalia
- Phylum: Chordata
- Class: Aves
- Order: Passeriformes
- Family: Meliphagidae
- Genus: Lichmera
- Species: L. deningeri

Binomial name
- Lichmera deningeri (Stresemann, 1912)

= Buru honeyeater =

Species of bird

The Buru honeyeater (Lichmera deningeri) is a species of bird in the honeyeater family. It is endemic to Indonesia. Its natural habitats are subtropical or tropical moist lowland forests and subtropical or tropical moist montane forests.
