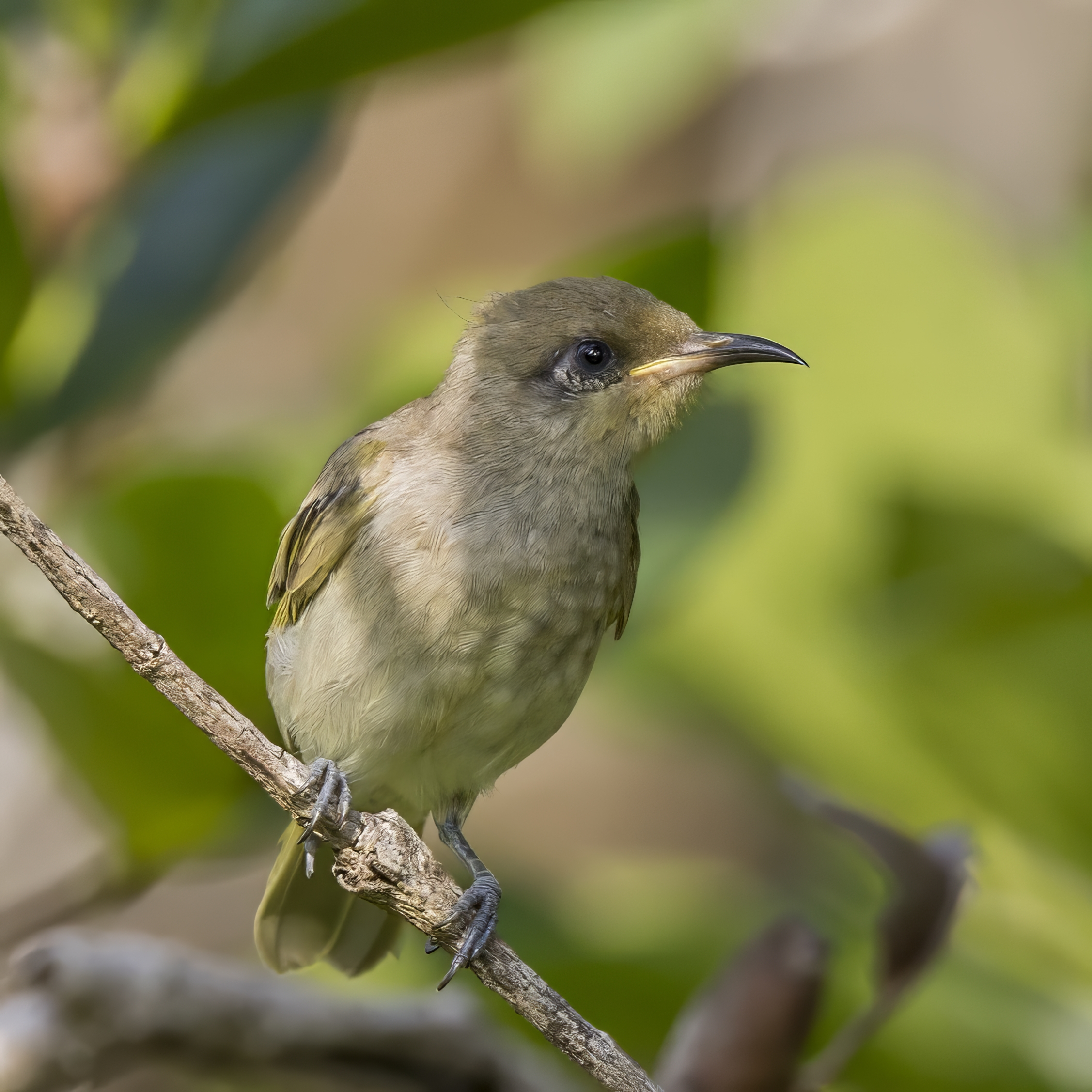
- Lichmera indistincta indistincta, Darwin, NT

Conservation status
- Least Concern (IUCN 3.1)

Scientific classification
- Kingdom: Animalia
- Phylum: Chordata
- Class: Aves
- Order: Passeriformes
- Family: Meliphagidae
- Genus: Lichmera
- Species: L. indistincta

Binomial name
- Lichmera indistincta (Vigors & Horsfield, 1827)

Synonyms
- Meliphaga indistincta Vigors & Horsfield, 1827; Gliciphila indistincta Gadow, 1884

= Brown honeyeater =

Species of bird

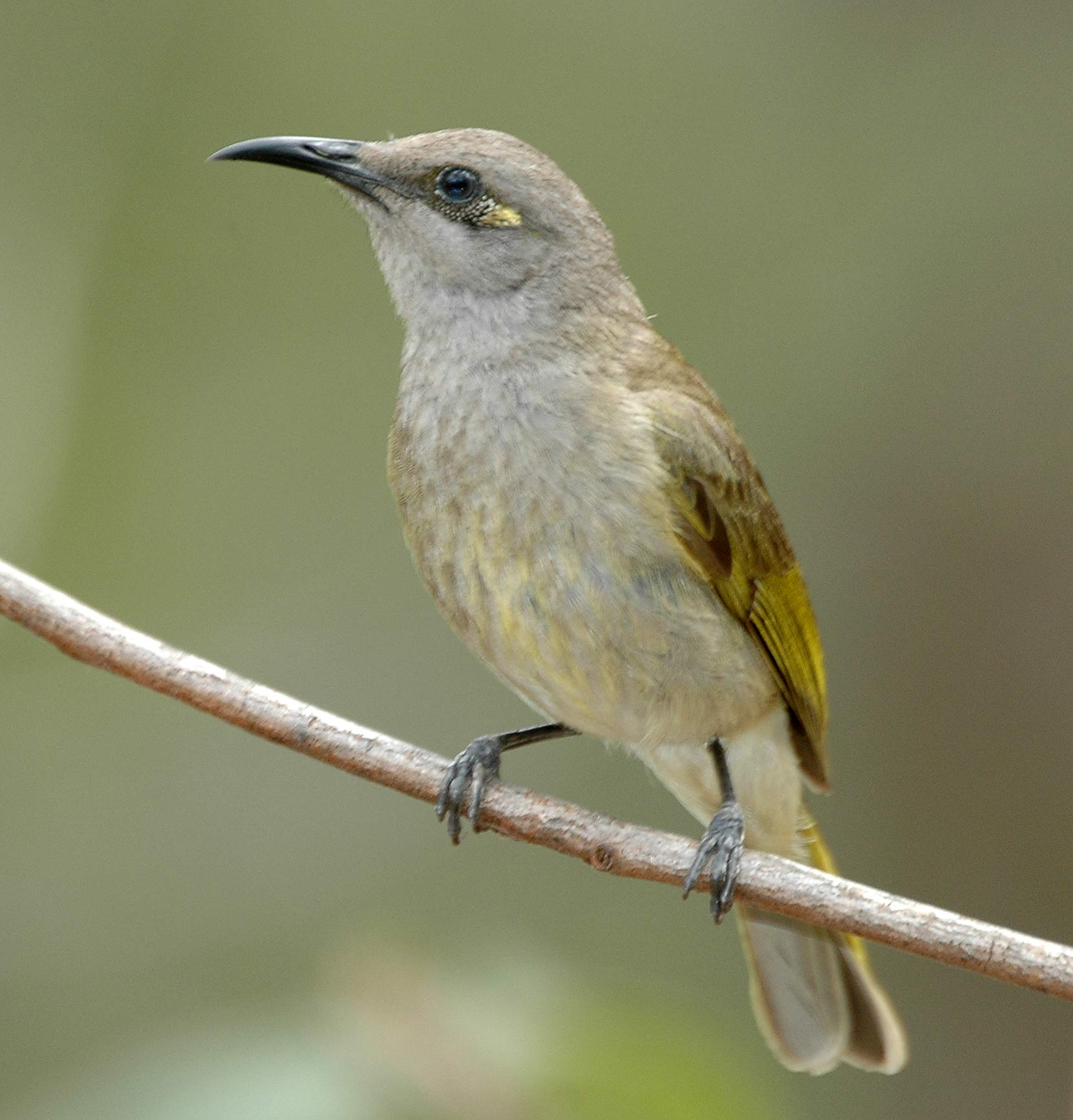
L. i. ocularis, SE Queensland

The brown honeyeater (Lichmera indistincta) is a species of bird in the family Meliphagidae. It belongs to the honeyeaters, a group of birds which have highly developed brush-tipped tongues adapted for nectar feeding. Honeyeaters are found mainly in Australia, New Guinea, and parts of Indonesia, but the brown honeyeater is unique in that it also occurs on the island of Bali, making it the only honeyeater to be found west of the Wallace Line, the biogeographical boundary between the Australian-Papuan and Oriental zoogeographical regions.

It is a medium-small brownish bird, with yellow-olive panels in the tail and wing, and a yellow tuft behind the eye. It is widespread across western, northern and eastern Australia, New Guinea and surrounding islands, and the Lesser Sundas of Indonesia. Throughout this range, the brown honeyeater occupies a range of habitats from mangroves to eucalypt woodlands. It is seasonally nomadic within its local area, following flowering food plants. While it usually forages alone, it also feeds in small groups, or flocks of mixed honeyeater species. Nectar and insects form its diet. It occupies the same breeding territory each year, and lays two or three eggs in a cup-shaped nest woven from grass and soft bark. Both sexes contribute to nest building and feeding the young. It has a loud, clear, musical song, described as the best of all the honeyeaters.

While the brown honeyeater is declining in some areas, such as the Wheatbelt region of Western Australia, overall its population levels and distribution are sufficient to have it described by the IUCN as being of least concern for conservation.

== Taxonomy ==
The brown honeyeater was originally described by Nicholas Aylward Vigors and Thomas Horsfield in 1827 as Meliphaga indistincta. The species name indistincta is from the Latin word meaning 'indistinct, obscure'. Vigors and Horsfield were working from the bird collection of the Linnean Society in London, and they said of the brown honeyeater specimen, "It is however in very bad condition, and scarcely admits of a description." Later included in the "catch-all" genus Gliciphila, the brown honeyeater is now classified as a member of the genus Lichmera, from the Greek word meaning 'to lick' or 'to dart the tongue', following Schodde (1975), Sibley and Monroe (1990) and Christidis and Boles (1994). As well as the nominate race Lichmera indistincta indistincta, a number of other subspecies are recognised: ocularis (derived from the Medieval Latin word oculus meaning 'eye'), melvillensis (named for Melville Island where it is found), limbatus (from the Latin for 'fringed') and nupta (from the Latin nubere meaning 'to marry'). The Indonesian honeyeater (subspecies limbatus) was previously considered a distinct species due to its disjunct range, but is now treated as a subspecies of L. indistincta by major taxonomic authorities. A 2017 genetic study using both mitochondrial and nuclear DNA confirms the close relationship between the two, their lineages having diverged recently (in the order of tens of thousands of years).

Molecular analysis has shown honeyeaters to be related to the Pardalotidae (pardalotes), Acanthizidae (Australian warblers, scrubwrens, thornbills, etc.), and the Maluridae (Australian fairy-wrens) in the large superfamily Meliphagoidea.

== Description ==
=== Appearance ===
The brown honeyeater is a medium-small, plain grey-brown honeyeater with a body length of 12–16 centimetres (4.7–6.3 in), a wingspan of 18–23 centimetres (7.1–9.1 in), and an average weight of 9–11 grams (0.32–0.39 oz). The female is slightly smaller than the male, but the sexes differ only slightly in appearance. The head, back, rump, and upper tail-coverts are brown, and the wings a darker brown. The only distinguishing features are a small yellow patch behind the eye, which is indistinct in some birds, and dull yellow-olive panels in the folded wings and tail. The brown honeyeater's sexual dimorphism is slight. The adult male has a dark brownish-grey forehead and crown, contrasting with a brownish nape. The forehead and crown of the adult female is a similar olive-brown to the rest of the upper body. A juvenile bird is similar to the female, but may lack or show only a trace of the yellow tuft behind the eye. The bill is black, and is long, slender, and curved slightly downwards, well adapted for probing deep tubular flowers. The gape in the male is black when breeding, and pale yellow at other times. The gape of the female is always pale yellow, and in the juvenile it is bright yellow and swollen. The iris is brown, and the feet and legs grey-black.

The appearance of the various subspecies is uniform, with other races similar in size and plumage to the nominate race with slight variations in degrees of colouration, and small differences in the length of the bill and the tail. Compared with L. i. indistincta, the male L. i. ocularis has slightly darker feathers on the top of the head with a greater contrast between crown and nape, and a longer bill. L. i. melvillensis has a moderately darker throat and breast than indistincta, and the female has a shorter tail. In L. i. nupta the differences between the sexes are even slighter than in the nominate race.

=== Vocalizations ===
The nondescript brown honeyeater has a noteworthy song, usually described in superlatives. "A glorious voice, easily the best songster among Australian honeyeaters," is how one study of West Australian birds noted. "As a singer it has no superior among the honeyeater family, or for that matter, among Australian birds," said another report. It has a clear, rolling, musical call, rendered as sweet-sweet-quarty-quarty, which is very loud for the size of the bird. Both sexes call, usually early in the morning, though the male calls throughout the day during the breeding season. The alarm call is a harsh ke-ke given several times at short intervals.

== Distribution and habitat ==
The brown honeyeater is found in a wide range of wooded habitats, and is widespread across Australia. The nominate race ranges across a broad band from Newcastle on the New South Wales coast north and west to Queensland and the Top End to southwestern Western Australia. It is rarely seen in Sydney, where populations have declined since the late 1950s, though it is being recorded in suitable habitats, such as Homebush Bay and Kurnell in small numbers, and is a vagrant to the Illawarra region. It is rare in South Australia, and not present in Victoria and Tasmania. Population densities range from 2.3 birds per 1 hectare (2.5 acres) in the Kakadu National Park, to 0.26 birds per hectare in Wellard in Western Australia.

L. i. ocularis is found in New Guinea, the Torres Strait Islands, and Cape York intergrading with the nominate race along the Gulf of Carpentaria river system. L. i. melvillensis inhabits the Tiwi Islands, while L. i. limbata is found in Bali and the Lesser Sundas, and L. i. nupta on the Aru Islands.

The brown honeyeater is seasonally nomadic across its local area in response to flowering food plants. For example, there are marked increases in numbers in Toowoomba in southeast Queensland during winter, and in the Northern Territory the range contracts during the dry season. It is commonly found among mangroves in coastal areas including black mangroves (Rhizophora mucronata). It is often in woodlands that merge into the mangroves, such as those dominated by Banksia, Melaleuca or Callistemon, and widespread in sclerophyll forests and eucalypt woodlands. In the arid and semi-arid inland of Australia, it is most often recorded in Acacia, Grevillea and Hakea shrubland along watercourses, and at bores, springs, and drainage lines. It visits flowering shrubs in parks and gardens, and occurs in remnant patches of trees on travelling stock routes.

== Behaviour ==
A busy, acrobatic bird, the brown honeyeater is frequently on the wing, hovering over flowers and pursuing insects in flight.

=== Feeding ===
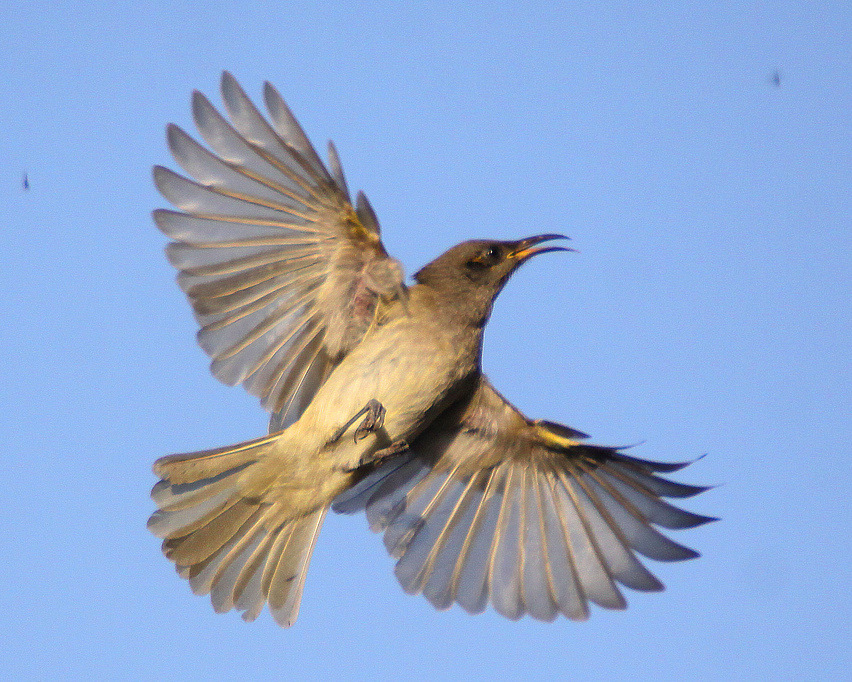
Insects are caught in flight.

The brown honeyeater feeds mainly in the foliage and flowers in the canopy of trees and shrubs, though it does use all levels of the habitat including the ground. It feeds singly and in pairs, but will gather in small groups or in mixed-species feeding flocks with other honeyeaters, such as banded, yellow-tinted, black-chinned and rufous-throated. Observations of foraging birds record the brown honeyeater feeding primarily on nectar, and taking some insects. Main sources of nectar include flowering mistletoe and mangroves, bloodwood, woollybutt, cajeput, and Banksia and Grevillea species. Nectar is primarily taken from flowers with cups of stamens, brush-shaped inflorescences, or tubular flowers. The brown honeyeater will hover above small flowers while extracting nectar, perch on a stem for large single flowers, and, in the case of Banksia flowers, perch on unopened florets at the top of the inflorescence.

Insects were most often gleaned from leaves or bark, and sometimes caught by sallying or taken from the ground. Insects eaten include beetles, flies, ants, wasps, and bees.

The brown honeyeater is more active in the early morning than at other times of the day; flying more when visiting flowers at the time when nectar is most abundant. Its body mass decreases during the night, and then increases during the day with the greatest increase occurring during the important first hour of early morning foraging. It seems to make up around half of the overnight water loss during this hour. The energy that the brown honeyeater can potentially get from nectar exceeds its requirements in all seasons except winter, when it needs to be selective in the plants that are used, to balance energy intake and expenditure. It compensates for any lessening in nectar concentration by increasing the frequency of feeding.

=== Breeding ===
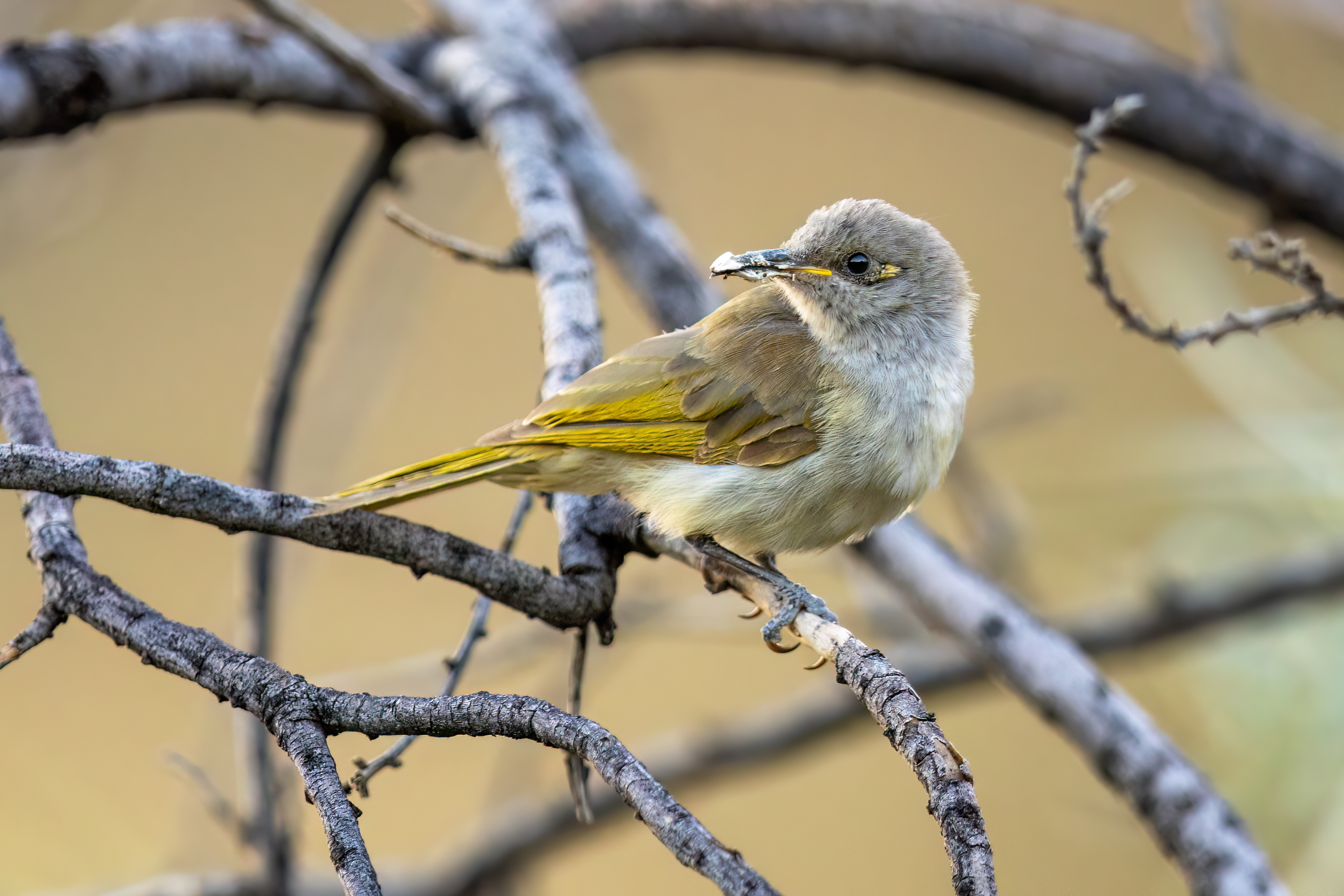
L. i. indistincta, NT

No courtship displays of the brown honeyeater have been recorded, other than increased singing from vantage points by the male. The pair usually nests solitarily in areas of low population density. In an area near Newcastle, New South Wales, with a number of breeding pairs, all nests were at least 20 metres (66 ft) apart. The same nesting territories are occupied each year; however, it is not known if the territories, or the nests, are used by the same birds each year.

The breeding season varies markedly across the brown honeyeater's range, with breeding recorded in one location or another in every month of the year. Breeding can occur two or more times a year, if conditions are favourable. The nest is built in a variety of vegetation types, usually in dense foliage in the fork of a horizontal branch, often near water, and rarely more than 2 metres (6.6 ft) above ground. The nest is a small, deep, round cup, woven from small pieces of grass and soft bark, especially Melaleuca bark, bound with spider web and lined with plant down, such as from Banksias, or with cow-hair or wool. Both sexes contribute to the nest building, though the male also stands guard while the female is building the nest.

The eggs vary in shape, but most often are a rounded oval. They are white and lustreless, and sometimes have a pinkish or brownish tinge. They can be unmarked, or spotted with faint reddish or brownish flecks. The eggs are approximately 17 millimetres (0.67 in) long and 13 millimetres (0.51 in) across, and laid in a clutch of two or three. The female incubates the eggs and broods the chicks alone, but both sexes feed the young and remove faecal sacs. The fledging period is thirteen or fourteen days, with around 44% of nests, where the outcome was known, successfully fledging young.

Nests are known to be predated by green tree ants, which attack the newly hatched nestlings, and by the pied currawong, which takes young from the nest. Nests are parasitized by the brush cuckoo, pallid cuckoo, and Horsfield's bronze-cuckoo.

== Conservation status ==
The brown honeyeater population is declining in the Wheatbelt region of Western Australia as a result of the clearing of native vegetation. Numbers are increasing in urban areas, particularly in parks and gardens and around farms; however, the new habitats have increased the incidences of death from cats, cars and collisions with windows. Overall the population is sufficiently large and widespread for the brown honeyeater to be considered by the IUCN to be of least concern for conservation.
