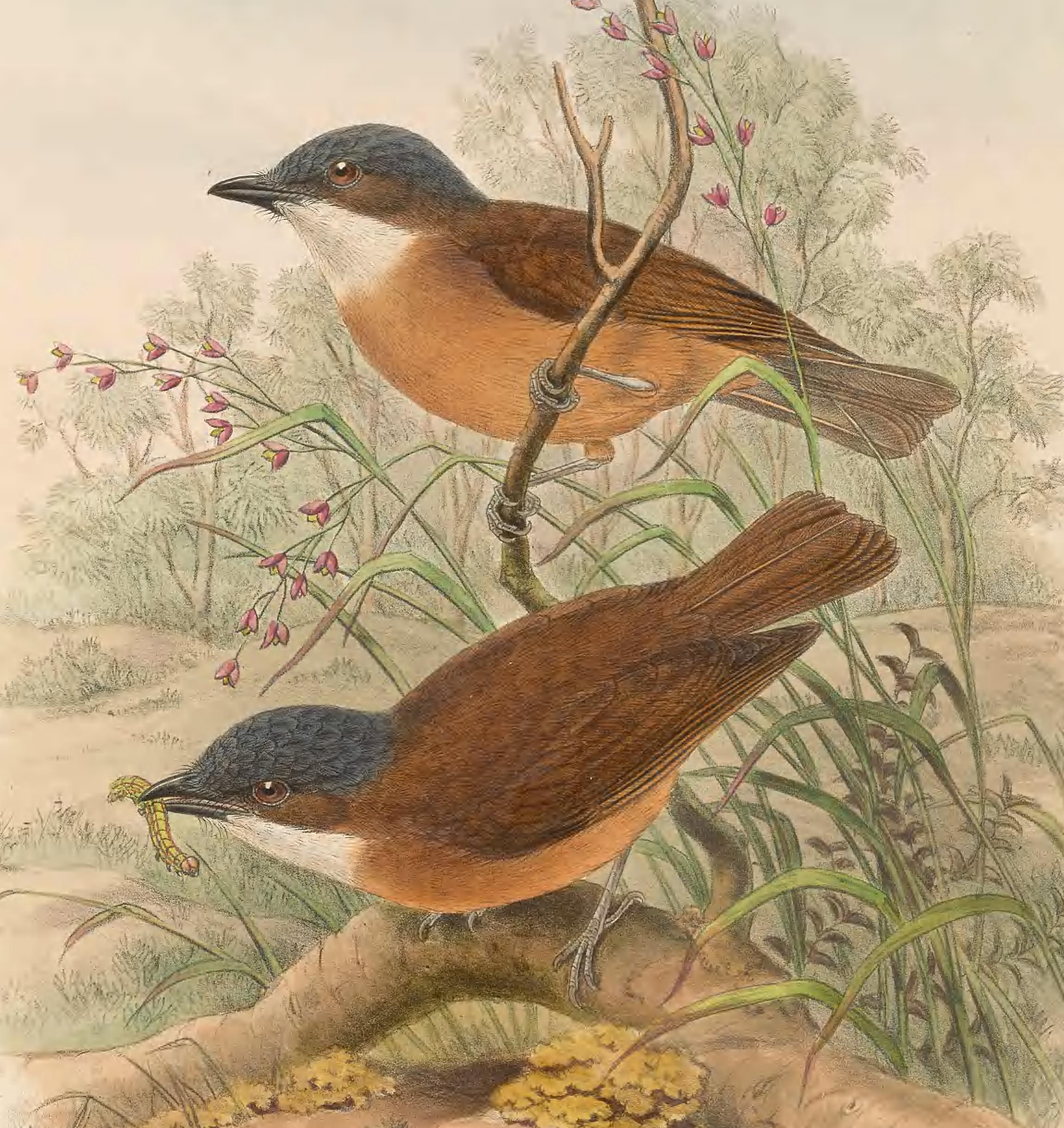
- Male illustration by William Matthew Hart

Conservation status
- Least Concern (IUCN 3.1)

Scientific classification
- Kingdom: Animalia
- Phylum: Chordata
- Class: Aves
- Order: Passeriformes
- Family: Pachycephalidae
- Genus: Pachycephala
- Species: P. hyperythra

Binomial name
- Pachycephala hyperythra Salvadori, 1876

Subspecies
- See text

= Rusty whistler =

Species of bird

The rusty whistler (Pachycephala hyperythra) is a species of bird in the family Pachycephalidae. It is endemic to lowland mountain areas of New Guinea. Its natural habitat is subtropical or tropical moist lowland forests.

== Nomenclature ==
Alternate names for the rusty whistler include the Bornean mountain whistler, brownish whistler, rufous-breasted whistler and rusty-breasted whistler. The latter name should not be confused with the species of the same name, Pachycephala fulvotincta.

== Subspecies ==
Four subspecies are recognized:

- P. h. hyperythra Salvadori, 1876 : Wandammen, Weyland & Foja Mountains; upper Fly, Palmer and Ok Tedi rivers.
- P. h. sepikiana Stresemann, 1921 : mountains northern New Guinea.
- P. h. reichenowi Rothschild & E. J. O. Hartert, 1911 : Saruwaged Range.
- P. h. salvadorii Rothschild, 1897 : mountains east from Lake Kutubu and Mount Bosavi.
