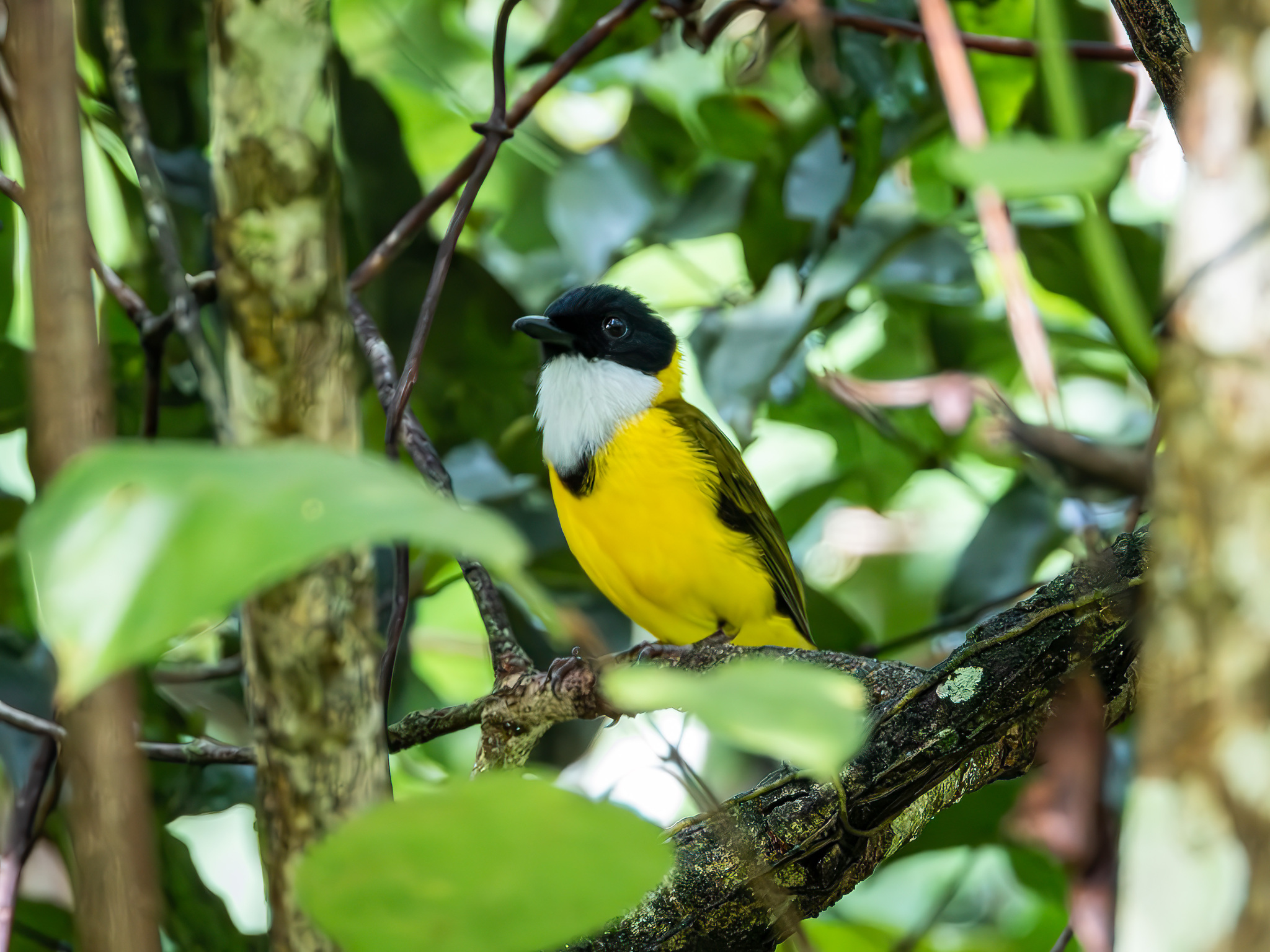
- Pachycephala mentalis mentalis
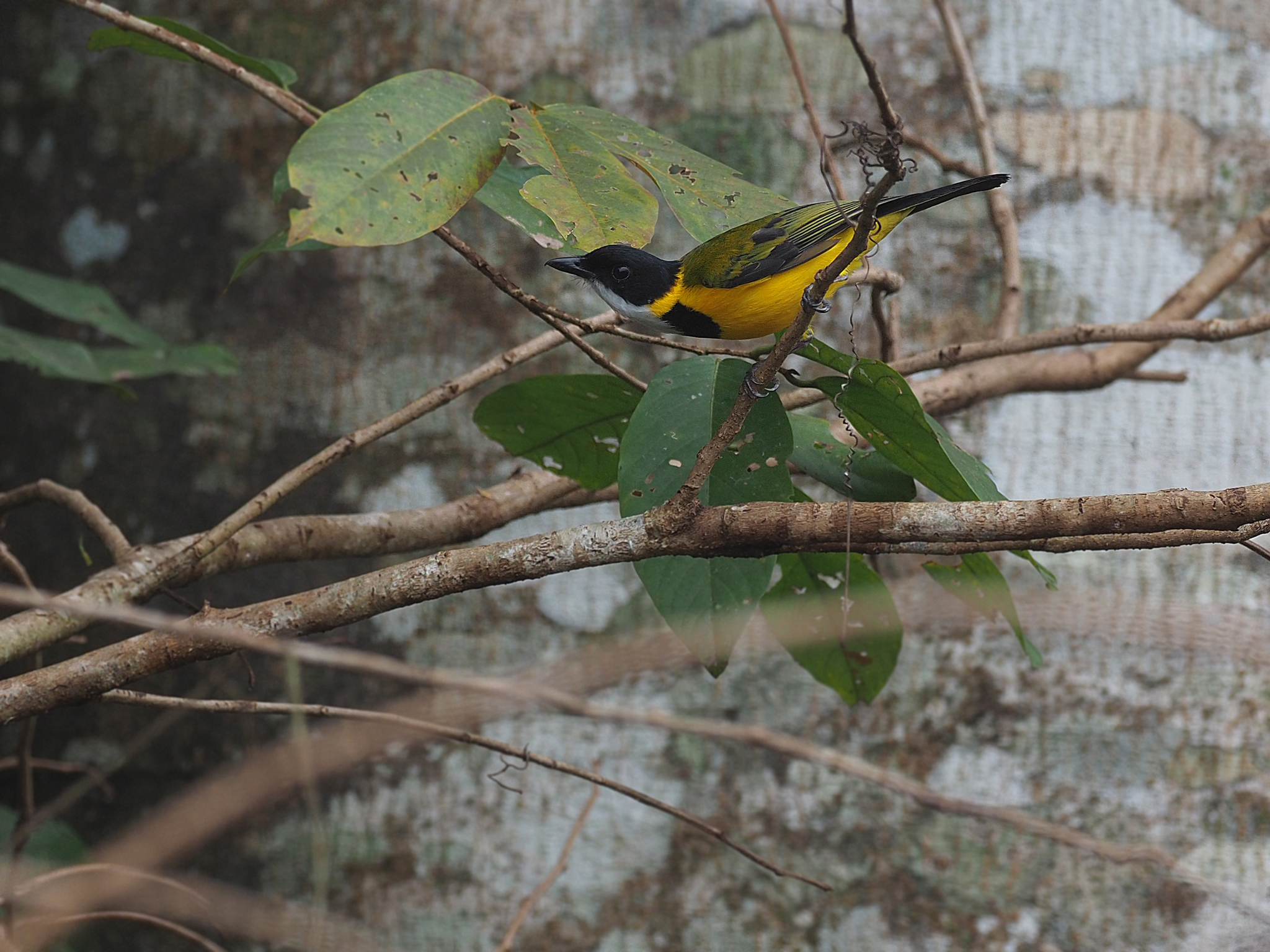
- Pachycephala mentalis obiensis

Conservation status
- Least Concern (IUCN 3.1)

Scientific classification
- Kingdom: Animalia
- Phylum: Chordata
- Class: Aves
- Order: Passeriformes
- Family: Pachycephalidae
- Genus: Pachycephala
- Species: P. mentalis

Binomial name
- Pachycephala mentalis Wallace, 1863

Subspecies
- See text

Synonyms
- Pachycephala pectoralis mentalis

= Black-chinned whistler =

Species of bird

The black-chinned whistler (Pachycephala mentalis) is a species of bird in the family Pachycephalidae, endemic to Halmahera and adjacent smaller islands in North Maluku in Indonesia.

== Taxonomy and systematics ==
It is variably considered a subspecies of the Australian golden whistler or treated as a separate species, but strong published evidence in favour of either treatment is limited, and further study is warranted to resolve the complex taxonomic situation.

=== Subspecies ===
Three subspecies are recognized:

- Pachycephala mentalis tidorensis – van Bemmel, 1939: Found on Tidore and Ternate islands
- Pachycephala mentalis mentalis – Wallace, 1863: Found on Bacan, Halmahera and Morotai islands
- Pachycephala mentalis obiensis – Salvadori, 1878: Originally described as a separate species. Found on Obi Islands (Obi and Bisa)

== Description ==
The black-chinned whistler is the northernmost member of the golden whistler group, being bordered to the south by the yellow-throated whistler. The black-chinned whistler is relatively large, and males are white-throated, have an incomplete black chest-band (only distinct in the center of the chest; does not connect to the black head) and a small black chin (lacking in Obi Islands).
