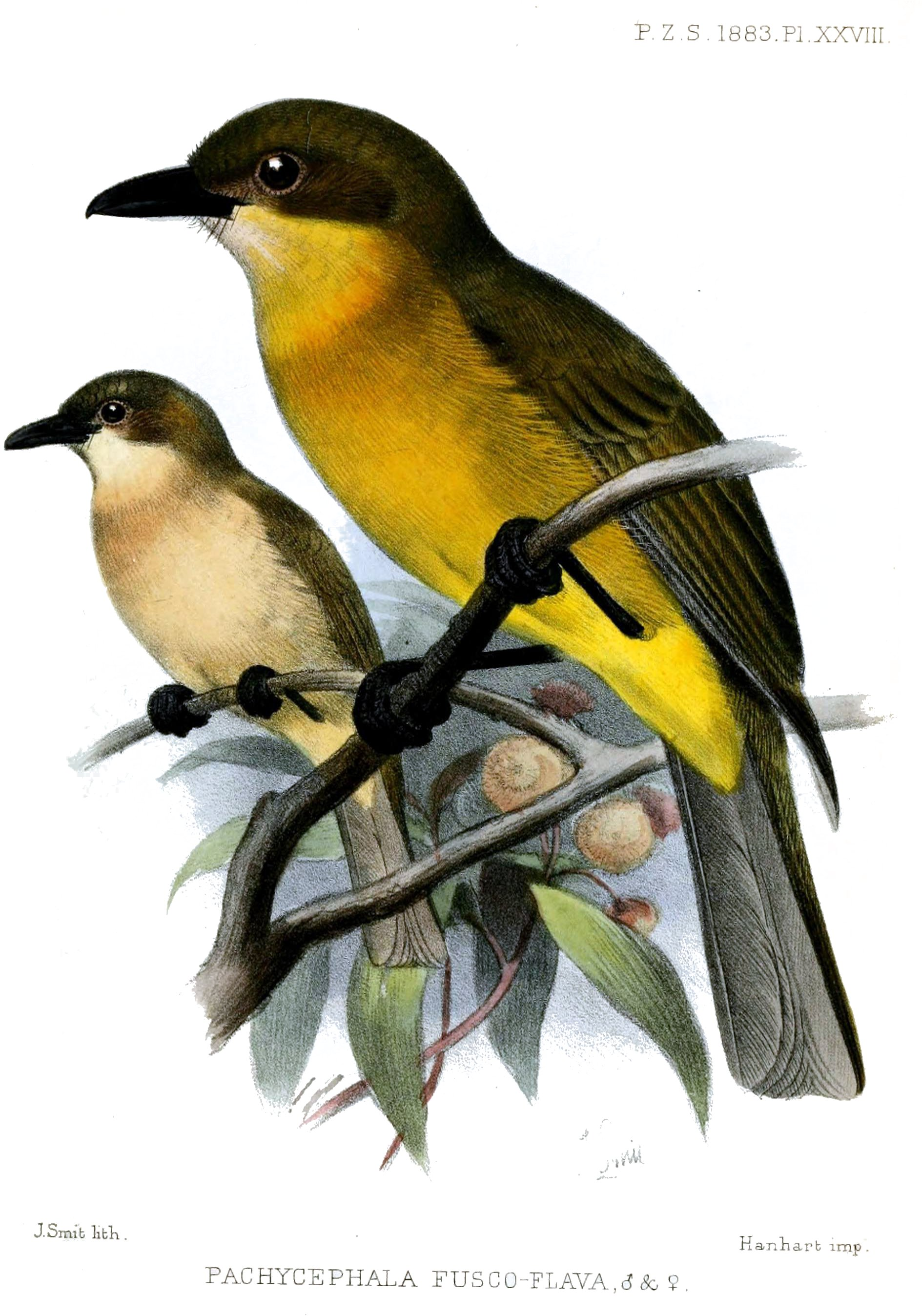
- Pachycephala macrorhyncha fuscoflava
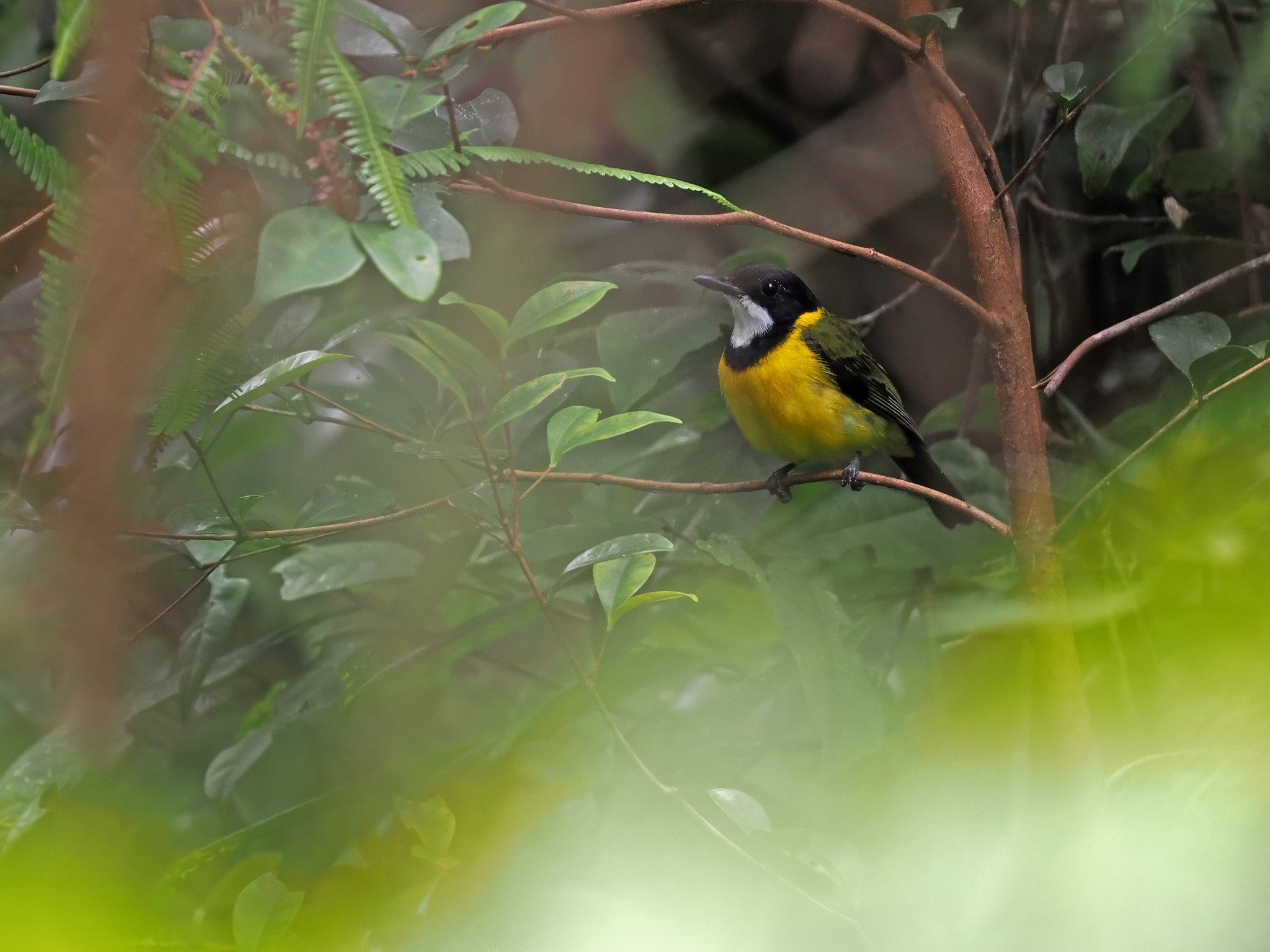
- Pachycephala macrorhyncha clio

Scientific classification
- Kingdom: Animalia
- Phylum: Chordata
- Class: Aves
- Order: Passeriformes
- Family: Pachycephalidae
- Genus: Pachycephala
- Species: P. macrorhyncha

Binomial name
- Pachycephala macrorhyncha Strickland, 1849

Synonyms
- Myiolestes macrorhynchus; Pachycephala calliope; Pachycephala pectoralis macrorhyncha; Pachycephala pectoralis macrorhynchus

= Yellow-throated whistler =

Species of bird

The yellow-throated whistler (Pachycephala macrorhyncha), or Banda Sea whistler, is a species of bird in the family Pachycephalidae. It is endemic to central and south-eastern Wallacea, where it ranges from Timor east to the Tanimbars and north to Seram and Banggai (roughly equalling the islands in or adjacent to the Banda Sea). The oriole whistler is sometimes alternatively called the yellow-throated whistler, leading to confusion between both species.

== Taxonomy and systematics ==
The yellow-throated whistler was originally described in the genus Myiolestes (a synonym for Colluricincla). The yellow-throated whistler is variably considered as either a subspecies of the Australian golden whistler or treated as a separate species, but strong published evidence in favour of either treatment is limited, and further study is warranted to resolve the complex taxonomic situation.

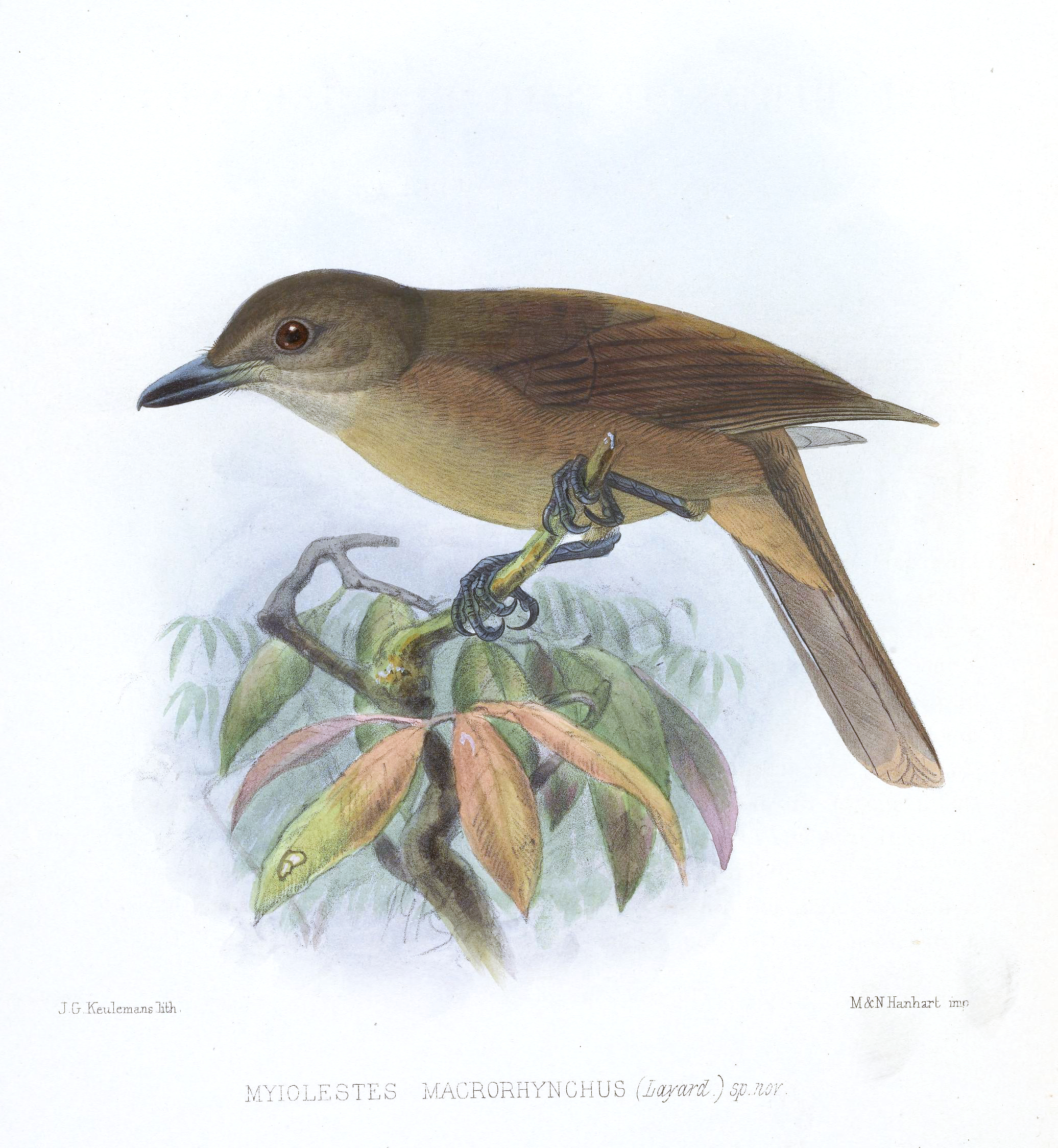

=== Subspecies ===
Five subspecies are recognized:

- P. m. fuscoflava Sclater, PL, 1883 – Tanimbar Islands (south Moluccas)
- P. m. macrorhyncha Strickland, 1849 – Seram and Ambon (central east Moluccas)
- P. m. buruensis Hartert, EJO, 1899 – Buru (central west Moluccas)
- P. m. clio Wallace, 1863 – Sula Islands (east of Sulawesi)
- P. m. pelengensis Neumann, 1941 – Banggai Island (east of Sulawesi)

The Baliem whistler (Pachycephala balim) and the Babar whistler (Pachycephala sharpei) were formerly considered as a subspecies. The subspecies par and compar have been moved to the fawn-breasted whistler (Pachycephala orpheus) based on phylogenetic analyses.

== Description ==
Among the members of the golden whistler group, the yellow-throated whistler is bordered to the north by the black-chinned whistler, to the west by the rusty-breasted whistler, and to the south by the Australian golden whistler. The only subspecies of the yellow-throated whistler where the male is yellow-throated is fuscoflava from the Tanimbar Islands. Males of other subspecies are white-throated.
