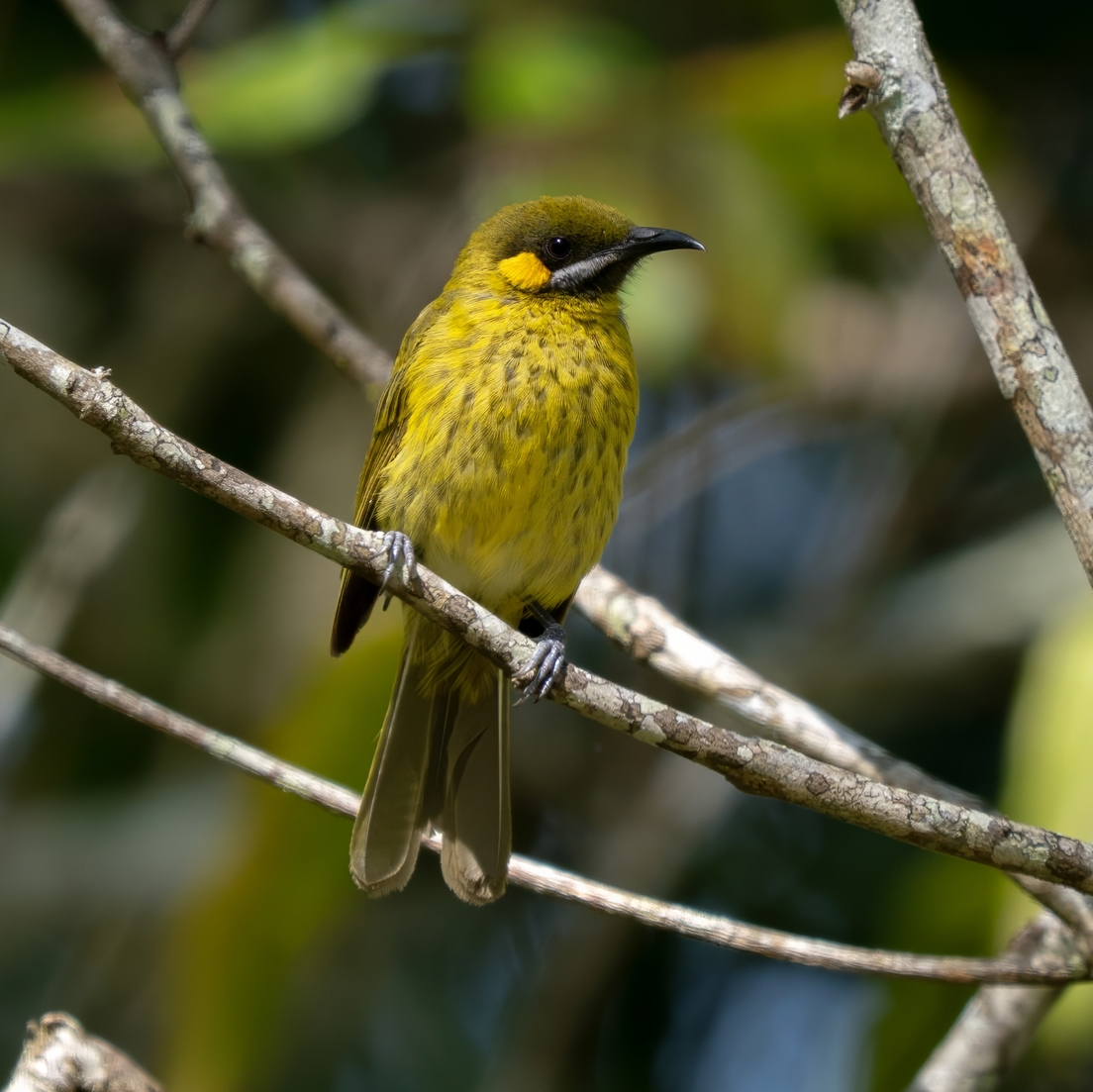

Conservation status
- Least Concern (IUCN 3.1)

Scientific classification
- Kingdom: Animalia
- Phylum: Chordata
- Class: Aves
- Order: Passeriformes
- Family: Meliphagidae
- Genus: Lichmera
- Species: L. flavicans

Binomial name
- Lichmera flavicans (Vieillot, 1817)

= Flame-eared honeyeater =

Species of bird

The flame-eared honeyeater (Lichmera flavicans), also known as the yellow-eared honeyeater, is a species of bird in the family Meliphagidae. It is found on Timor island. Its natural habitats are subtropical or tropical moist lowland forest and subtropical or tropical moist montane forest.
