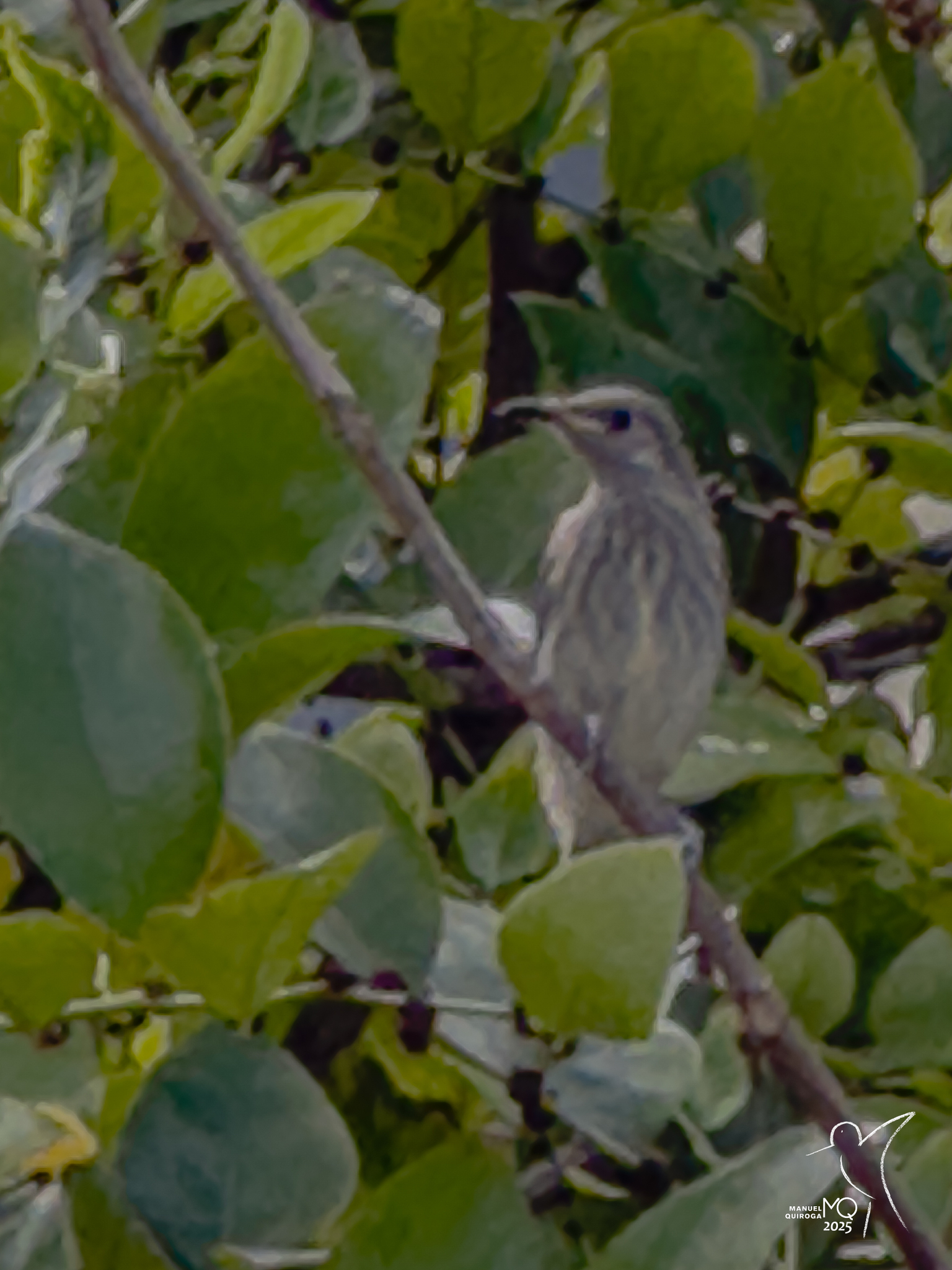

Conservation status
- Least Concern (IUCN 3.1)

Scientific classification
- Kingdom: Animalia
- Phylum: Chordata
- Class: Aves
- Order: Passeriformes
- Family: Meliphagidae
- Genus: Lichmera
- Species: L. alboauricularis

Binomial name
- Lichmera alboauricularis (Ramsay, 1878)

= Silver-eared honeyeater =

Species of bird

The silver-eared honeyeater (Lichmera alboauricularis) is a species of bird in the family Meliphagidae. It is found in New Guinea. Its natural habitat is subtropical or tropical mangrove forests.

== Description ==
The Silver-eared honeyeater is a sparrow-sized honeyeater with a downcurved bill, a prominent white ear mark, plain brown upperparts, and pale underparts with distinct dark mottling on the breast. Inhabits open coastal areas with canegrass and scattered trees, and also mangroves and coconut plantations. Generally occurs within vegetation close to watercourses. Combination of streaked chest, pale ear patch, and plain brown upperparts separate it from all other New Guinea honeyeaters. Vocalizations include harsh chattering and nasal "weet-weet-weet" calls, as well as a sharp "jit" note.
