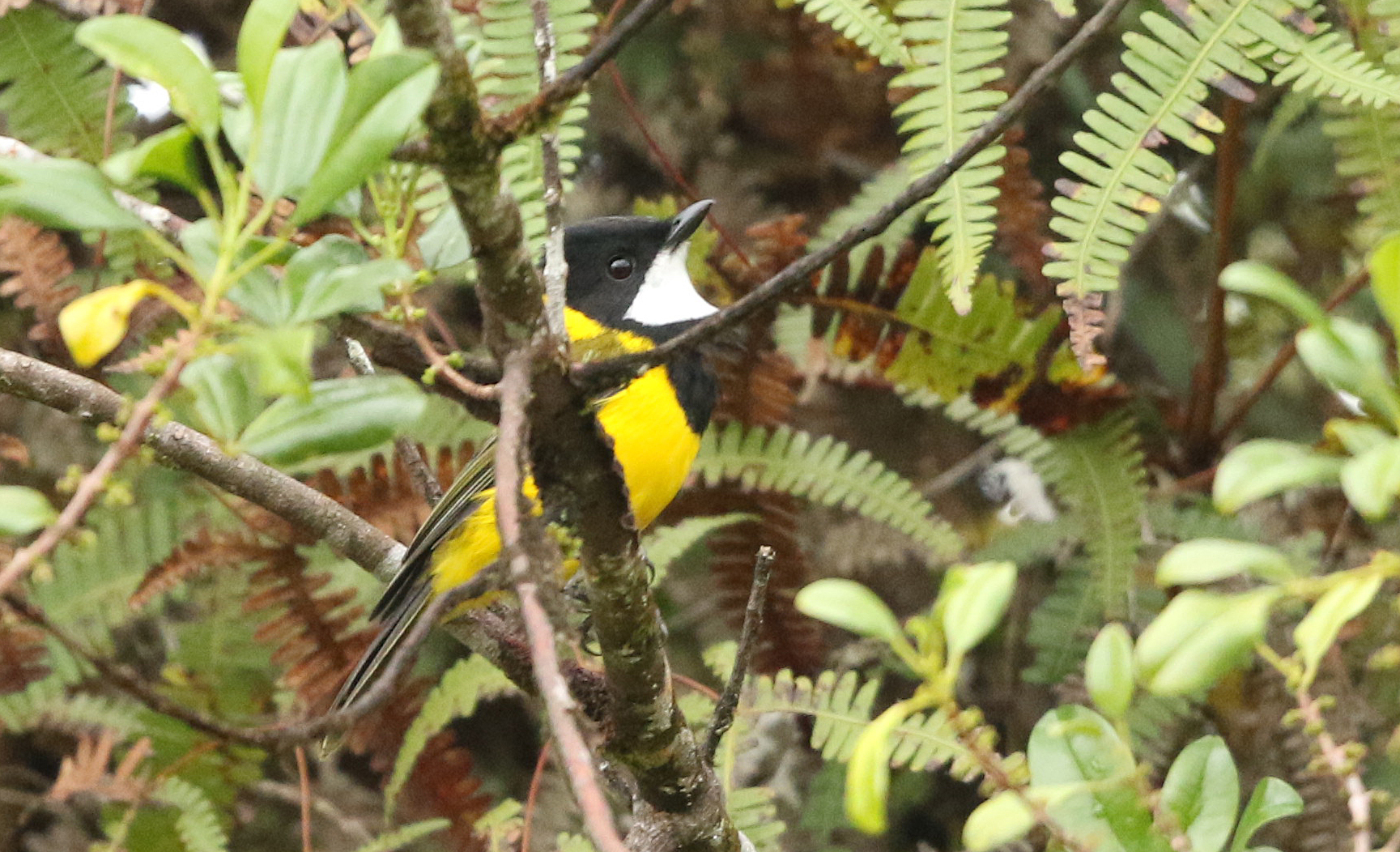

Conservation status
- Not evaluated (IUCN 3.1)

Scientific classification
- Kingdom: Animalia
- Phylum: Chordata
- Class: Aves
- Order: Passeriformes
- Family: Pachycephalidae
- Genus: Pachycephala
- Species: P. balim

Binomial name
- Pachycephala balim Rand, 1940

Synonyms
- Pachycephala melanura balim; Pachycephala pectoralis balim; Pachycephala macrorhyncha balim

= Baliem whistler =

Species of bird

The Baliem whistler or Balim whistler (Pachycephala balim) is a species of bird of the whistler family Pachycephalidae that is endemic to New Guinea.

== Taxonomy and systematics ==
The Baliem whistler was formerly considered as a subspecies of the Australian golden whistler and also of the mangrove golden and the yellow-throated whistler. It has since been re-classified as a separate species by the IOC in 2016. Many other authorities do not yet recognize this split and re-classification.

== Distribution ==
The Baliem whistler is found in the Snow Mountains of Papua Province in Indonesia.
