= List of endemic birds of Sulawesi =

Sulawesi has a high degree of endemism in its bird species. Sulawesi supports twelve endemic bird genera.

== Conservation status ==
NE = not evaluated	NT = near threatened	CR = critical
DD = data deficient	VU = vulnerable	EW = extinct in the wild
LC = least concern	EN = endangered	EX = extinct

== Bucerotiformes ==
=== Bucerotidae ===
- Penelopides exarhatus (Sulawesi hornbill) - VU
- Rhyticeros cassidix (knobbed hornbill) - VU

== Caprimulgiformes ==
=== Caprimulgidae ===
- Caprimulgus celebensis (Sulawesi nightjar) - LC
- Eurostopodus diabolicus (Sulawesi eared-nightjar) - VU

== Charadriiformes ==
=== Scolopacidae ===
- Scolopax celebensis (Sulawesi woodcock) - NT

== Columbiformes ==
=== Columbidae ===
- Gallicolumba tristigmata (Sulawesi ground dove) - LC
- Turacoena manadensis (white-faced cuckoo-dove) - LC
- Ptilinopus fischeri (red-eared fruit-dove) - LC
- Ptilinopus epia (maroon-chinned fruit-dove) - NT
- Ducula forsteni (white-bellied imperial pigeon) - LC
- Ducula luctuosa (silver-tipped imperial pigeon) - LC
- Ducula radiata (grey-headed imperial pigeon) - LC
- Cryptophaps poecilorrhoa (sombre pigeon) - LC

== Coraciiformes ==
=== Alcedinidae ===
- Actenoides monachus (green-backed kingfisher) - NT
- Actenoides princeps (scaly kingfisher) - LC
- Cittura cyanotis (lilac-cheeked kingfisher) - NT
- Ceyx fallax (Sulawesi kingfisher) - NT
- Pelargopsis melanorhyncha (great-billed kingfisher) - LC
- Todiramphus enigma (Talaud kingfisher) - NT

=== Meropidae ===
- Meropogon forsteni (purple-bearded bee-eater) - LC
- Coracias temminckii (purple-winged roller) - LC

=== Piciformes ===
- Dendrocopos temminckii (Sulawesi pygmy woodpecker) - LC
- Mulleripicus fulvus (ashy woodpecker) - LC

== Craciformes ==
=== Megapodiidae ===
- Macrocephalon maleo (maleo) - EN
- Megapodius bernsteinii (Sula scrubfowl) - NT

== Cuculiformes ==
=== Cuculidae ===
- Cuculus crassirostris (Sulawesi hawk-cuckoo) - LC
- Centropus celebensis (bay coucal) - LC
- Eudynamys melanorhynchus (black-billed koel) - LC
- Phaenicophaeus calyorhynchus (yellow-billed malkoha) - LC

== Falconiformes ==
=== Accipitridae ===
- Spilornis rufipectus (Sulawesi serpent eagle) - LC
- Accipiter griseiceps (Sulawesi goshawk) - LC
- Accipiter nanus (small sparrowhawk) - NT
- Accipiter rhodogaster (vinous-breasted sparrowhawk) - LC
- Accipiter trinotatus (spot-tailed sparrowhawk) - LC

== Gruiformes ==
=== Rallidae ===
- Aramidopsis plateni (snoring rail) - VU
- Amaurornis isabellina (isabelline bush-hen) - LC
- Amaurornis magnirostris (Talaud bush-hen) - VU
- Gymnocrex rosenbergii (blue-faced rail) - VU
- Gymnocrex talaudensis (Talaud rail) - EN

== Passeriformes ==
=== Artamidae ===
- Artamus monachus (ivory-backed woodswallow) - LC

=== Campephagidae ===
- Coracina temminckii (cerulean cuckoo-shrike) - LC
- Coracina bicolor (pied cuckoo-shrike) - NT
- Coracina abbotti (pygmy cuckoo-shrike) - LC
- Coracina schistacea (slaty cuckoo-shrike) - LC
- Coracina morio (Sulawesi cicadabird) - LC
- Coracina leucopygia (white-rumped cuckoo-shrike) - LC
- Lalage leucopygialis (white-rumped triller) - LC

=== Corvidae ===
- Corvus unicolor (Banggai crow) - CR
- Corvus typicus (piping crow) - LC

=== Dicaeidae ===
- Dicaeum nehrkorni (crimson-crowned flowerpecker) - LC
- Dicaeum celebicum (grey-sided flowerpecker) - LC
- Dicaeum aureolimbatum (yellow-sided flowerpecker) - LC

=== Dicruridae ===
- Dicrurus montanus (Sulawesi drongo) - LC

=== Meliphagidae ===
- Myza celebensis (dark-eared myza) - LC
- Myza sarasinorum (white-eared myza) - LC
- Myzomela chloroptera (Sulawesi myzomela) - LC

=== Monarchidae ===
- Hypothymis puella (pale-blue monarch) - LC

=== Muscicapidae ===
- Ficedula rufigula (rufous-throated flycatcher) - NT
- Ficedula bonthaina (Lompobattang flycatcher) - EN
- Cyornis sanfordi (Matinan flycatcher) - EN
- Cyornis hoevelli (blue-fronted flycatcher) - LC
- Cyornis omissus (Sulawesi blue-flycatcher) - LC
- Muscicapa sodhii (Sulawesi streaked flycatcher)

=== Nectariniidae ===
- Aethopyga duyvenbodei (elegant sunbird) - EN

=== Pachycephalidae ===
- Hylocitrea bonensis (olive-flanked whistler) - LC
- Coracornis raveni (maroon-backed whistler) - LC
- Coracornis sanghirensis (Sangihe shrikethrush) - CR
- Pachycephala sulfuriventer (sulphur-bellied whistler) - LC

=== Pellorneidae ===
- Trichastoma celebense (Sulawesi babbler) - LC

=== Phylloscopidae ===
- Phylloscopus sarasinorum (Sulawesi leaf-warbler) - LC

=== Rhipiduridae ===
- Eutrichomyias rowleyi (cerulean flycatcher) - CR
- Rhipidura teysmanni (Sulawesi fantail) - LC

=== Timaliidae ===
- Malia grata (malia) - LC

=== Turdidae ===
- Zoothera erythronota (red-backed thrush) - NT
- Zoothera heinrichi (Sulawesi mountain-thrush) - NT
- Zoothera mendeni (red-and-black thrush) - NT
- Cataponera turdoides (Sulawesi thrush) - LC
- Heinrichia calligyna (great shortwing) - LC

=== Sturnidae ===
- Basilornis celebensis (Sulawesi myna) - LC
- Streptocitta albicollis (white-necked myna) - LC
- Streptocitta albertinae (bare-eyed myna) - NT
- Enodes erythrophris (fiery-browed myna) - LC
- Scissirostrum dubium (finch-billed myna) - LC
- Acridotheres cinereus (pale-bellied myna) - LC

=== Zosteropidae ===
- Zosterops consobrinorum (pale-bellied white-eye) - LC
- Zosterops anomalus (lemon-throated white-eye) - LC
- Zosterops atrifrons (black-crowned white-eye) - LC
- Zosterops nehrkorni (Sangihe white-eye) - CR
- Zosterops somadikartai (Sangihe white-eye) - NT
- Lophozosterops squamiceps (streaky-headed white-eye) - LC

== Psittaciformes ==
=== Psittacidae ===
- Loriculus exilis (red-billed hanging-parrot) - NT
- Loriculus stigmatus (great hanging parrot) - LC
- Loriculus catamene (Sangihe hanging parrot) - NT
- Loriculus sclateri (Sula hanging parrot) - LC

=== Psittaculidae ===
- Saudareos meyeri (yellow-cheeked lorikeet) - LC
- Trichoglossus ornatus (ornate lorikeet) - LC
- Prioniturus flavicans (yellowish-breasted racquet-tail) - NT
- Prioniturus platurus (golden-mantled racquet-tail) - LC
- Eos histrio (red-and-blue lory) - EN

== Strigiformes ==
=== Strigidae ===
- Ninox ochracea (ochre-bellied hawk-owl) - NT
- Ninox ios (cinnabar boobook) - VU
- Ninox punctulata (speckled boobook) - LC
- Ninox burhani (Togian hawk-owl) - NT
- Otus collari (Sangihe scops owl) - LC
- Otus siaoensis (Siau scops owl) - CR
- Otus manadensis (Sulawesi scops owl) - LC

=== Tytonidae ===
- Tyto inexspectata (Sulawesi golden owl) - VU
- Tyto rosenbergii (Sulawesi owl) - LC
- Tyto nigrobrunnea (Taliabu masked owl) - EN

== See also ==
- Fauna of Indonesia
- Fauna of New Guinea
- Lists of birds by region
- List of birds of Indonesia
  - List of birds of Indonesia (non-passerine)
  - List of birds of Indonesia (passerine)
- Endemic birds of Indonesia
