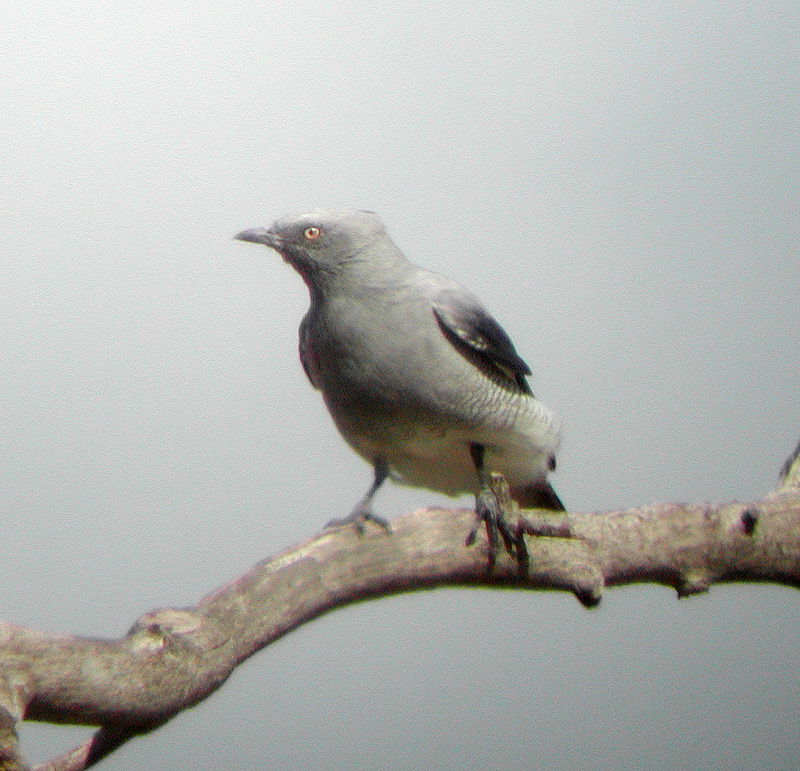

Conservation status
- Least Concern (IUCN 3.1)

Scientific classification
- Kingdom: Animalia
- Phylum: Chordata
- Class: Aves
- Order: Passeriformes
- Family: Campephagidae
- Genus: Coracina
- Species: C. maxima

Binomial name
- Coracina maxima (Rüppell, 1839)

= Ground cuckooshrike =

Ground cuckoo-shrike

Species of bird

The ground cuckooshrike (Coracina maxima) is an uncommon bird species endemic to Australia, occurring mainly in open woodland and arid grasslands throughout inland Australia, but also occasionally in areas on the east coast.

== Taxonomy ==
Coracina maxima is one of 81 species in the family Campephagidae, 7 of which occur in Australia. The family can be divided into 2 groups, one of which contains 13 of the 81 species, and occur only in Asia. The other group, which includes genus Coracina (cuckooshrikes, cicadabirds and trillers), occurs in Africa, southern and Southeast Asia, Australia and islands in the west Pacific. Occurring in Australia are four species of cuckooshrike. The black-faced cuckooshrike (Coracina novaehollandiae) is a common species that occurs throughout all of Australia. The white-bellied cuckooshrike (Coracina papuensis) is uncommon and only occurring in the northern parts of the Northern Territory, as well as most of Queensland, Victoria and eastern New South Wales. The barred cuckooshrike (Coracina lineata) is a rare species and only occurs along the east coast of Queensland, and parts of the NSW coast. These three cuckooshrikes all occur in other countries including Indonesia, Papua New Guinea and the Solomon Islands. The ground cuckooshrike is an uncommon species and is endemic to Australia, occurring in parts of all the mainland Australian states and territories.

== Description ==
The ground cuckooshrike is a slender, long-legged bird, the largest of the cuckooshrikes measuring 33–37 cm in length, and weighing approximately 115 g. It was named cuckooshrike not because it is affiliated with either the cuckoo or the shrike, but because of the similar features that it has to both these birds. The stout, hooked shrike-like beak and plumage which is similar to that of the cuckoo are the reason for its name.

The adult bird possesses a pale grey head and upper body, with pale yellow eyes. Its lower back, rump and underparts are white and finely barred with black, contrasting with the black wings and the slightly forked black tail. This forked tail is a characteristic specific to the ground cuckooshrike. The immature ground cuckooshrike is similar in appearance to the adult, but has fine, broken black barrings on the throat and upper parts and dark eyes with a dark eye-line, instead of a black mask with pale yellow eyes. The flight call of this bird is a distinctive pee-ew, pee-ew or chill-chill….kee-lik, keelick. Due to the colouration of the ground cuckooshrike, when in flight they can look quite black-and-white and so may be mistaken for an Australian magpie.

== Distribution and habitat ==
The distribution of the ground cuckooshrike is widespread across Australia, mainly occurring in Queensland, New South Wales, South Australia, Western Australia, Northern Territory, Australian Capital Territory and in some parts of Victoria. They occur mostly inland of the Great Dividing Range in Australia's semi-arid regions, but also occur in areas on the east coast. They have been found to occur in areas of open woodland, arid shrub-land and open grasslands that are dominated by dead trees and species such as mulga, cypress-pine and mallee-spinifex. Ground cuckooshrikes are more likely to occur in these habitats if they are located near watercourses, floodplains, creeks and wetlands. Because of the location of the preferred habitats, they are more frequently found in inland areas rather than coastal regions. Various reports have recorded their presence in woodland areas located on river channels and floodplains, mulga shrubland and cleared woodland regrowth areas.

Despite their large range throughout Australia, they are an uncommon species, thinly distributed and probably nomadic, which can make it hard to predict their location and where they can be expected to be seen. The current population trend of the ground cuckooshrike is said to be decreasing, possibly due to declines in the Murray-Mallee region since the mid 1970s. Dolby and Clarke (2014) clearly lists and describes places where the ground cuckooshrike can be expected to be spotted.

== Behaviour ==
=== Feeding ===
The ground cuckooshrike, as its name suggests, mainly feeds on the ground, being adapted to this kind of feeding with their long legs and the ability to run quickly along the ground. They spend a lot of their time foraging on bare open ground in small groups for their food, which consists of mainly on insects. Their diet includes adult and larval arthropods such as praying mantis, grasshoppers, locust, ants and spiders.

=== Breeding and nesting ===
Ground cuckooshrikes are generally encountered in small groups of three or more. This is possibly because the young stay in the family group until the next breeding season, sometimes helping to feed the new young. They make their nests on branches or forks of trees 3 to 15 m high, with bark, grass, stems and other material, or use the old nests of magpie-larks or white-winged chough.

The breeding season is from August to November, with the birds forming monogamous pairs and laying between two and five eggs in the nest, which is sometimes shared with other females, as more than one female are known to lay eggs in the same nest during the same breeding season. The eggs are a glossy olive colour with brown/red-brown markings on them.

== Threats and conservation status ==
Though the population of the ground cuckooshrike is decreasing, its conservation status is classed as least concern. In 2013, it was listed as vulnerable in Victoria under the Advisory List of Threatened Vertebrate Fauna in Victoria 2013.

A possible threat to the ground cuckooshrike is the increase in woody vegetation density. This would benefit most woodland bird species, but in the case of the ground cuckooshrike which dwells in open woodland habitats, it could have a detrimental effect on its population.
