= Melanesian cuckooshrike =

Melanesian cuckooshrike is a common name for several birds in the genus Coracina and may refer to:

- North Melanesian cuckooshrike (Coracina welchmani)
- South Melanesian cuckooshrike (Coracina caledonica)
