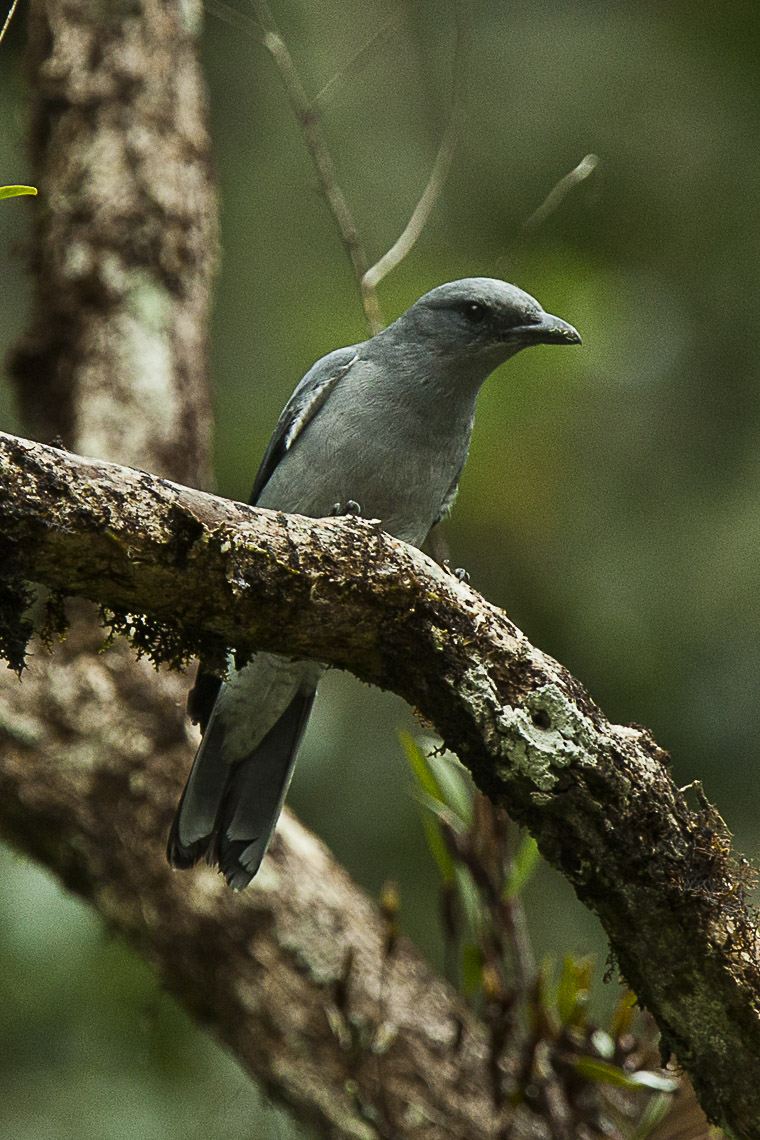

Conservation status
- Least Concern (IUCN 3.1)

Scientific classification
- Kingdom: Animalia
- Phylum: Chordata
- Class: Aves
- Order: Passeriformes
- Family: Campephagidae
- Genus: Coracina
- Species: C. javensis

Binomial name
- Coracina javensis (Horsfield, 1821)

Synonyms
- Ceblephyris javensis Horsfield, 1821

= Oriental cuckooshrike =

Species of bird

The Oriental cuckooshrike (Coracina javensis) is a species of bird in the family Campephagidae. It is widely distributed from the Himalayas through Southeast Asia to east China and Taiwan. It is also found on the islands of Java and Bali in Indonesia. Its natural habitat is subtropical or tropical moist lowland forest. The range of this species was formerly restricted to Java and Bali and had the English name "Javan cuckooshrike".

== Taxonomy ==
Six subspecies are recognised. All except C. j. javensis were formerly considered to be subspecies of the large cuckooshrike (now renamed the Indian cuckooshrike).

- C. j. javensis (Horsfield, 1821) – Java and Bali
- C. j. nipalensis (Hodgson, 1836) – Himalayas from north Pakistan to northeast India and Bangladesh
- C. j. andamana (Neumann, 1915) – Andaman Islands (west of south Myanmar)
- C. j. siamensis (Baker, ECS, 1918) – Myanmar and south China (Yunnan) to Thailand and Indochina
- C. j. larvivora (Hartert, EJO, 1910) – Hainan (off southeast China)
- C. j. rexpineti (Swinhoe, 1863) – southeast China, Taiwan, north Laos and north Vietnam
