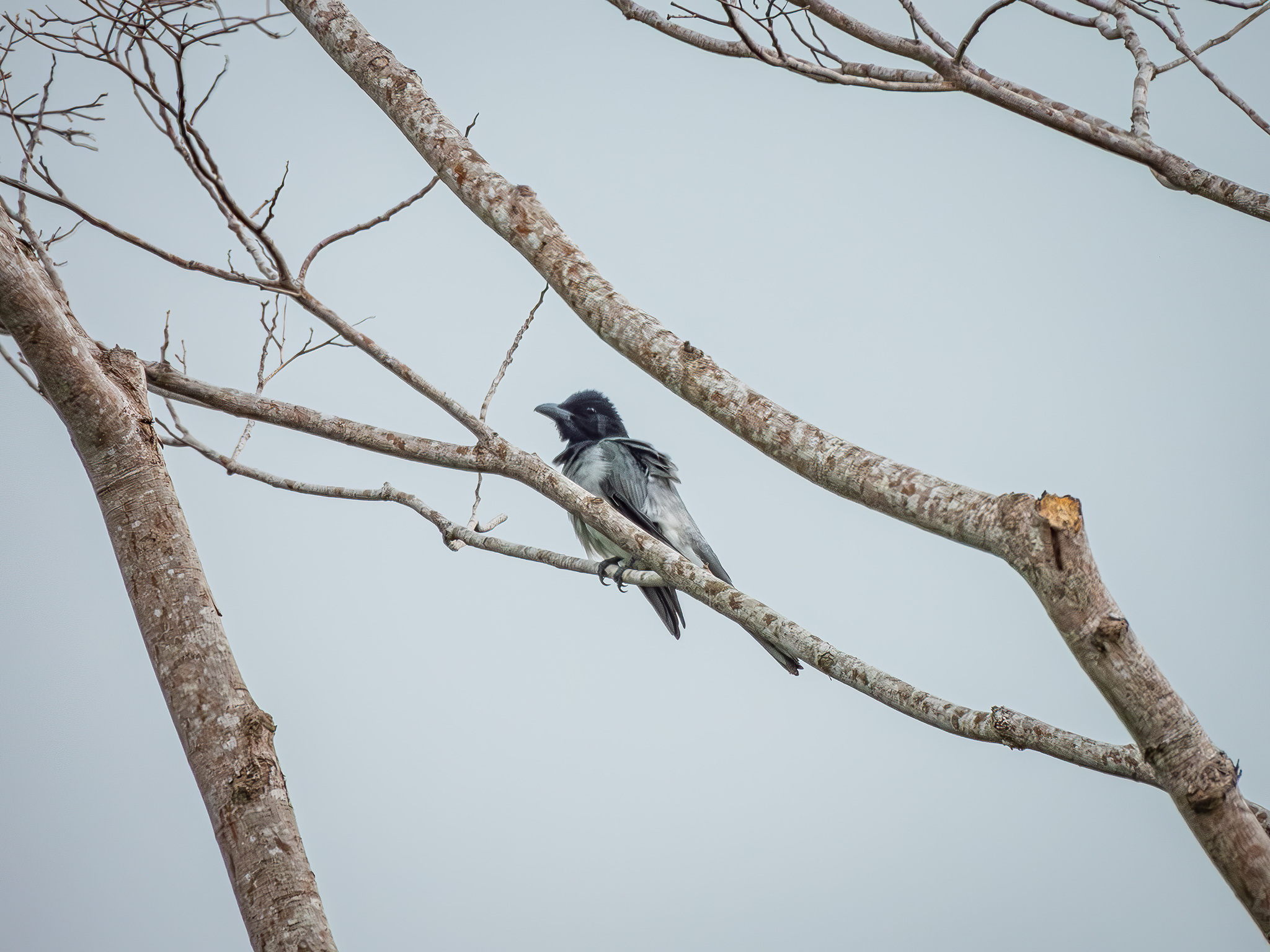

Conservation status
- Least Concern (IUCN 3.1)

Scientific classification
- Kingdom: Animalia
- Phylum: Chordata
- Class: Aves
- Order: Passeriformes
- Family: Campephagidae
- Genus: Coracina
- Species: C. atriceps

Binomial name
- Coracina atriceps (Müller, 1843)

= Moluccan cuckooshrike =

Species of bird

The Moluccan cuckooshrike (Coracina atriceps) is a species of bird in the family Campephagidae. It is endemic to Indonesia.

Its natural habitat is subtropical or tropical moist lowland forest.
