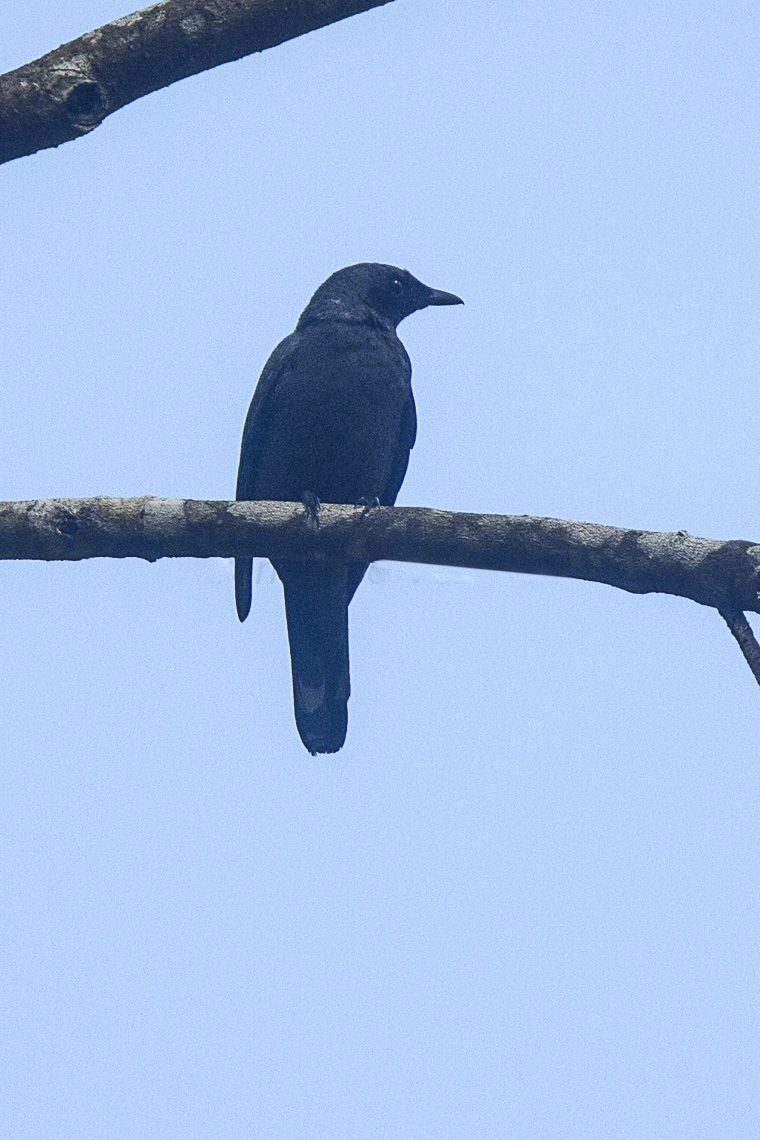

Conservation status
- Least Concern (IUCN 3.1)

Scientific classification
- Kingdom: Animalia
- Phylum: Chordata
- Class: Aves
- Order: Passeriformes
- Family: Campephagidae
- Genus: Coracina
- Species: C. parvula

Binomial name
- Coracina parvula (Salvadori, 1878)

Synonyms
- Edolisoma parvula; Graucalus parvulus

= Halmahera cuckooshrike =

Species of bird

Halmahera Cuckooshrike

The Halmahera cuckooshrike or Halmahera cicadabird (Coracina parvula) is a species of bird in the family Campephagidae. It is found in the northern Maluku Islands. Its natural habitat is subtropical or tropical moist lowland forest.

This species was formerly placed in the genus Edolisoma. It was moved to Coracina based on the results of a molecular phylogenetic study published in 2022.
