= Sangihe cicadabird =

Conservation status
- Not evaluated (IUCN 3.1)

Scientific classification
- Kingdom: Animalia
- Phylum: Chordata
- Class: Aves
- Order: Passeriformes
- Family: Campephagidae
- Genus: Edolisoma
- Species: E. salvadorii

Binomial name
- Edolisoma salvadorii Sharpe, 1878

Species of bird

The Sangihe cicadabird (Edolisoma salvadorii) is a passerine bird in the family Campephagidae that is endemic to the island of Sangir, also written as "Sangihe", and the Talaud Islands. These islands lie northeast of Sulawesi in Indonesia. The species was formerly considered to be conspecific with the Sulawesi cicadabird.

== Taxonomy ==
The Sangihe cicadabird was formally described in 1878 by the English ornithologist Richard Bowdler Sharpe based on specimens collected by Adolf Bernhard Meyer on the island of Sangir, also spelled "Sangihe", which lies north of Sulawesi in Indonesia. Sharpe coined the binomial name Edoliisoma salvadorii where the specific epithet was chosen to honour the Italian ornithologist Tommaso Salvadori. The Sangihe cicadabird was formerly considered to be conspecific with the Sulawesi cicadabird (Edolisoma morio). It was elevated to species status based on the difference in the female plumage and the genetic divergence.

Two subspecies are recognised:

- E. s. salvadorii Sharpe, 1878 – Sangihe Islands (northeast of Sulawesi)
- E. s. talautense Meyer, AB & Wiglesworth, 1895 – Talaud Islands (northeast of Sulawesi)
