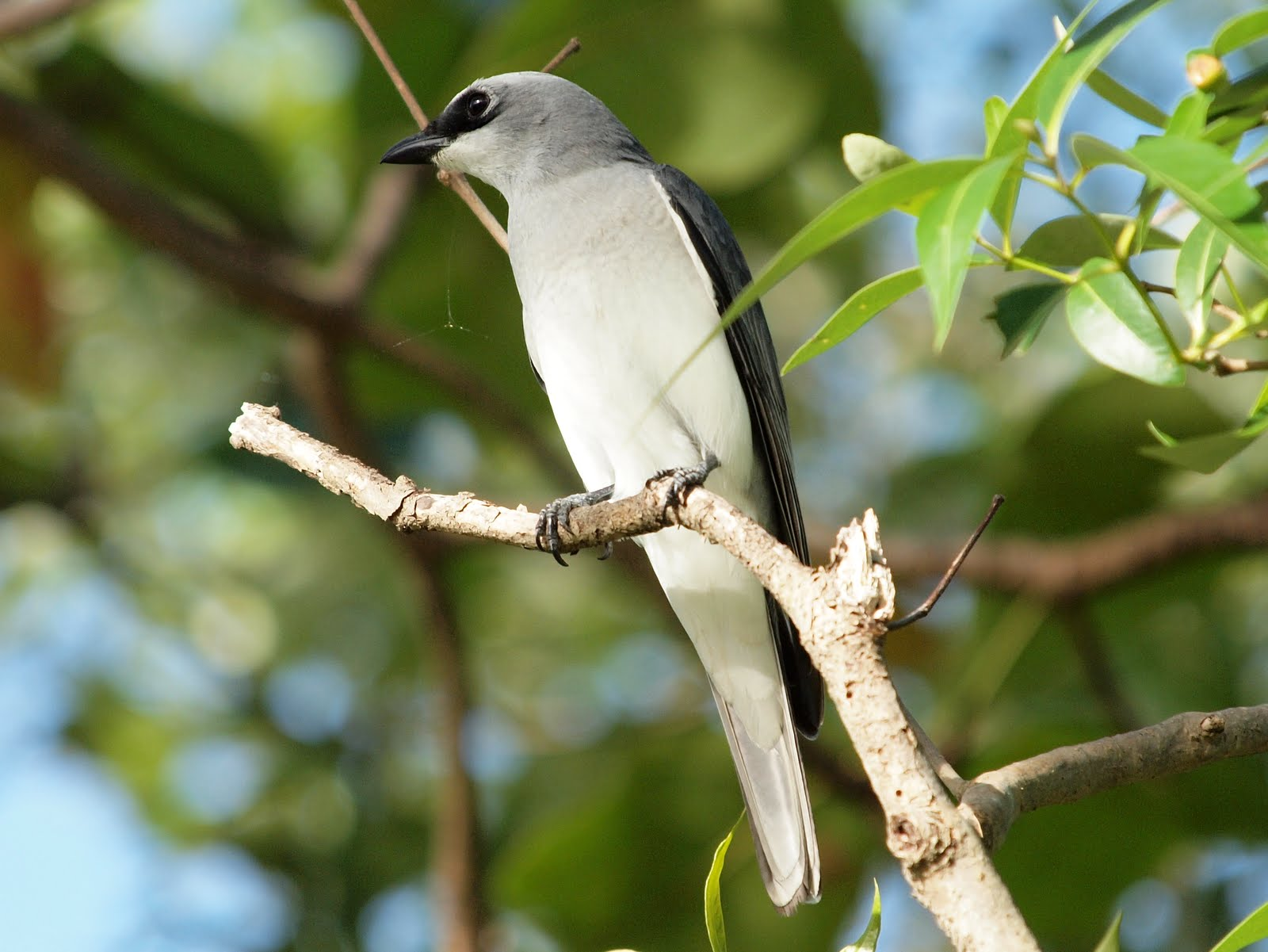
- In Far North Queensland, Australia

Conservation status
- Least Concern (IUCN 3.1)

Scientific classification
- Kingdom: Animalia
- Phylum: Chordata
- Class: Aves
- Order: Passeriformes
- Family: Campephagidae
- Genus: Coracina
- Species: C. papuensis

Binomial name
- Coracina papuensis (Gmelin, JF, 1788)

= White-bellied cuckooshrike =

Species of bird in the family Campephagidae

The white-bellied cuckooshrike (Coracina papuensis) is a species of bird in the family Campephagidae. It is found in Australia, the Moluccas, New Guinea and the Solomon Islands.

== Taxonomy ==
The white-bellied cuckooshrike was formally described in 1788 by the German naturalist Johann Friedrich Gmelin in his revised and expanded edition of Carl Linnaeus's Systema Naturae. He placed it with the crows in the genus Corvus and coined the binomial name Corvus papuensis. Gmelin based his description on "Le Choucari de la Nouvelle Guinée" that had been described in 1775 by the French polymath the Comte de Buffon and illustrated with a hand-coloured engraving by François-Nicolas Martinet. The type location was restricted to Manokwari in the Indonesian province of West Papua by Erwin Stresemann in 1913. The white-bellied cuckooshrike is now one of 22 species placed in the genus Coracina that was introduced in 1816 by French ornithologist Louis Pierre Vieillot.

Fourteen subspecies are recognised.

- C. p. papuensis (Gmelin, JF, 1788) – northern Moluccas, eastern Lesser Sunda Islands (Kisar, Luang, and Sermata), lowlands of northern and western New Guinea (Bird's Head Peninsula eastward, in the north, to the Huon Gulf, and in the south to the Lorentz River), including the Raja Ampat Islands
- C. p. angustifrons (Sharpe, RB, 1876) – southeastern New Guinea (Huon Gulf to Hall Sound)
- C. p. louisiadensis (Hartert, EJO, 1898) – Tagula Island (Louisiade Archipelago, off southeastern New Guinea)
- C. p. oriomo Mayr, E & Rand, AL, 1936 – southeastern New Guinea and northeastern Australia (Cape York Peninsula, northern Queensland)
- C. p. timorlaoensis (Meyer, AB, 1884) – Tanimbar Islands (Banda Sea)
- C. p. hypoleuca (Gould, J, 1848) – northwestern Australia (Kimberley region, northern Western Australia, eastward to northwestern Queensland); populations on Tanimbar, Kai Islands (south-east Moluccas), and Aru islands (off southwestern New Guinea) probably this subspecies
- C. p. apsleyi Mathews, GM, 1912 – north-central Australia (Tiwi Islands, off Northern Territory)
- C. p. artamoides Schodde, R & Mason, IJ, 1999 – eastern Australia (central Queensland to northern New South Wales)
- C. p. robusta (Latham, J, 1801) – southeastern Australia (northern New South Wales to Kingston, southeastern South Australia)
- C. p. sclaterii (Salvadori, AT, 1878) – Bismarck Archipelago
- C. p. perpallida Rothschild, LW & Hartert, EJO, 1916 – Bougainville Island, Choiseul Island, Santa Isabel, and Florida (northern Solomon Islands)
- C. p. elegans (Ramsay, EP, 1881) – New Georgia Group, Rendova, and Guadalcanal (central Solomon Islands)
- C. p. eyerdami Mayr, E, 1931 – Malaita (central Solomon Islands)
- C. p. ingens (Rothschild, LW & Hartert, EJO, 1914) – Admiralty Islands (Manus Island and Los Negros)

The subspecies C. p. ingens has sometimes been treated as a separate species, the Manus cuckooshrike.

== Description ==
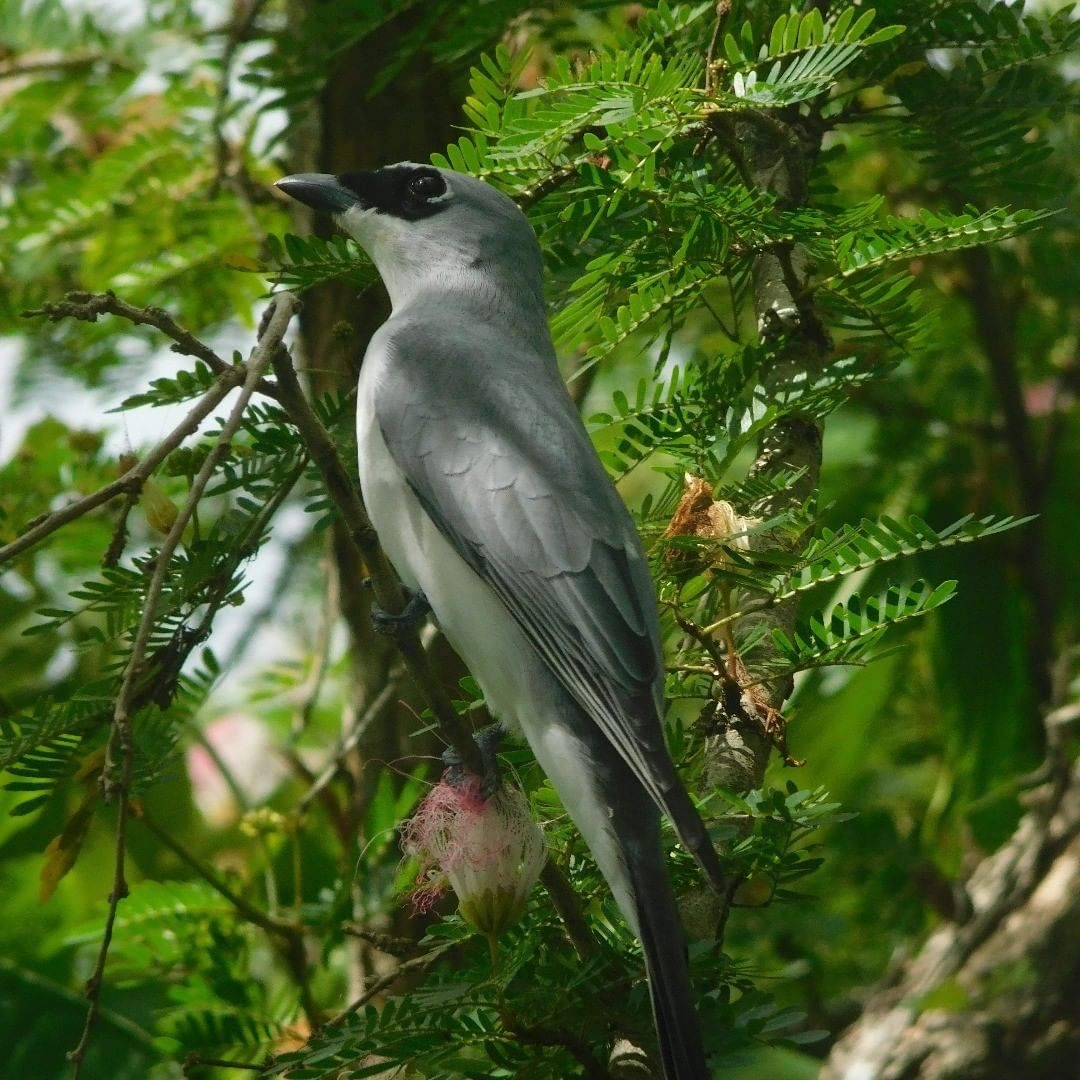
White-bellied cuckooshrike, Cairns tropical north Queensland, Australia

This species exhibits a short black mask extending from the beak to the eyes (lores) but not beyond with a fine white rear eye-ring. The head and upperparts including upper wings are pale blue-grey with tail feathers tending towards darker grey. Despite the name, the belly can be white to grey depending on region and subspecies. The subspecies Coracina papuensis robusta can present with a dark morph that has extensive black plumage on the neck and chest that can be barred at the edges. There is little variation between the sexes. Immature birds can have the underparts lightly barred and appear duller than adults with a less distinct black mask. This species can be mistaken for the black-faced cuckooshrike due to similar markings but is smaller with a more compact build. An adult white-bellied cuckooshrike grows to between 22 and 29 cm and weighs 55–80 g.

The white-bellied cuckooshrike has a characteristic call that is described as a peevish kissik kissik or quiseek. It also produces a weak, squealing, slurred, repeating whee-eeyu or wee-year that has been likened to that of a parrot (Psittacidae). It is often spotted flying due to its distinct undulating pattern of flight where the species gains altitude by flapping its wings then holding its wings stiffly downward to glide.

== Distribution and habitat ==
The white-bellied cuckooshrike range includes parts of Australia, Indonesia, Papua New Guinea and the Solomon Islands. In Australia it has been found throughout tropical northern Australia and eastern Australia including the northern parts of Western Australia, the Northern Territory, Queensland, New South Wales, Victoria and southeast South Australia. The white-bellied cuckooshrike is common throughout Papua New Guinea, the Solomon Islands and less common in Indonesia. In Indonesia the white-bellied cuckooshrike is commonly found in the northern Moluccas and occasionally found in Eastern Wallacea.

The white-bellied cuckooshrike thrives in many different habitats and vegetation types including, savanna, woodlands, Eucalyptus forests, riparian forest, rainforest, littoral forest, river redgum bushland, mangroves, open grasslands, coconut plantations, farmlands, and suburban gardens. It prefers lower-lying and forested habitats mainly below 800 m asl. They are predominantly sedentary or locally nomadic; however, the subspecies C. p. robusta can be considered migratory.

== Behaviour and ecology ==
=== Breeding ===
The white-bellied cuckooshrike breeds between August and March in Australia while in southern New Guinea (Port Moresby region) breeding occurs between March and June. Both adults construct the nest, usually on a horizontal fork from 7 to 10 m above the ground. The nest consists of a shallow cup made from a combination of grass, fine twigs, bark, leaves and vine tendrils bound together with spider webs and decorated with lichen. The clutch of eggs ranges from 1 to 3 with colourings differing between regions. In Papua New Guinea eggs appear pale blue-green with dark markings. In Australia eggs can exhibit a range of different colourings including pale olive-green to pale olive-brown, chestnut brown, and dull grey. The eggs are incubated and cared for by both adults with the incubation period lasting 21 or 22 days and the fledgling period lasting approximately 22 days.

=== Diet ===
They predominantly feed on larger insects like dragonflies (Odonata), cockroaches (Blattodea), mantids (Mantodea), grasshoppers (Orthoptera), bugs (Hemiptera), beetles (Coleoptera), stick-insects (Phasmatidae), lepidopteran larvae, and ants and wasps (Hymenoptera). Spiders (Araneae), fruit and seeds also feature in their diet. They typically employ gleaning to forage for insects among tree foliage singly, in twos or small groups. This involves moving though trees from canopy to mid-level taking insects from tree foliage. They also occasionally employ sallying techniques or forage on the ground.

== Conservation status ==
The white-bellied cuckooshrike has an extremely large range appearing throughout Australia, Papua New Guinea, the Solomon Islands and the Moluccas. Its population does not approach "thresholds for vulnerable status under the range size criterion (Extent of Occurrence <20,000 km^{2} combined with a declining or fluctuating range size, habitat extent/quality, or population size and a small number of locations or severe fragmentation)" and as the population trend appears to be increasing, it "does not approach the thresholds for Vulnerable under the population trend criterion (>30% decline over ten years or three generations)". Due to these reasons the white-bellied cuckooshrike is classified as Least Concern.
