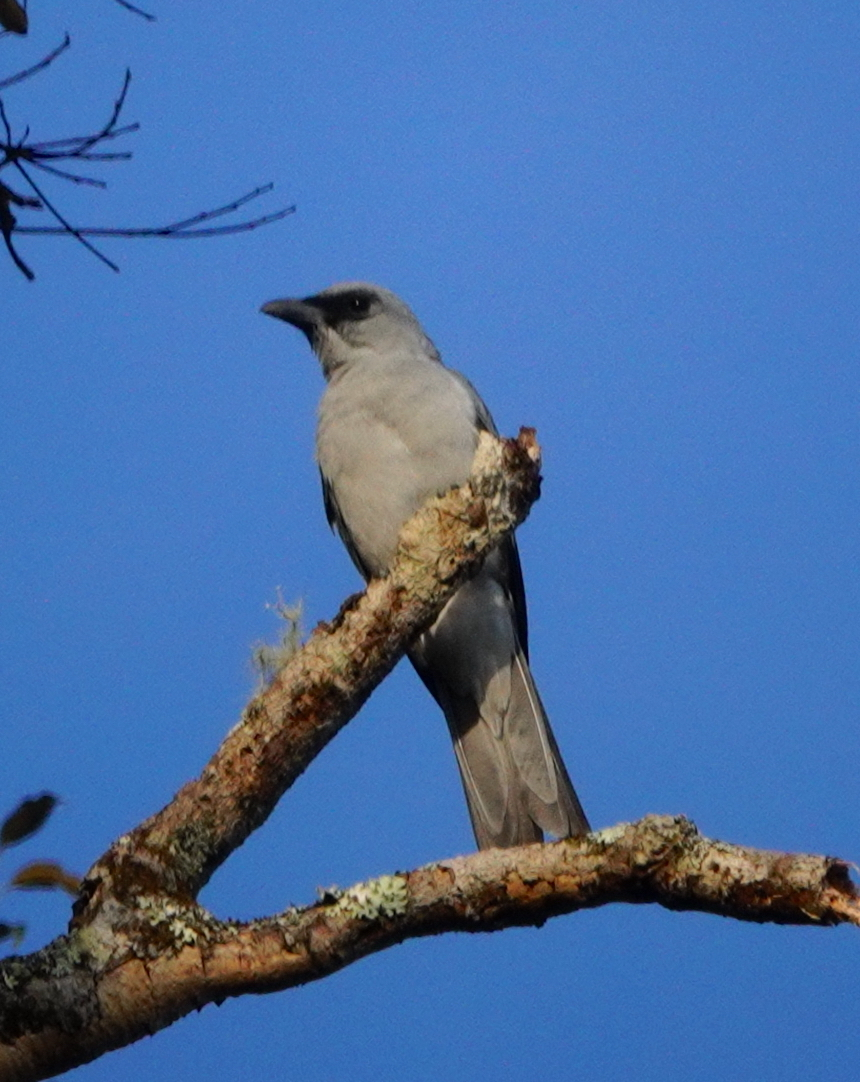

Conservation status
- Near Threatened (IUCN 3.1)

Scientific classification
- Kingdom: Animalia
- Phylum: Chordata
- Class: Aves
- Order: Passeriformes
- Family: Campephagidae
- Genus: Coracina
- Species: C. fortis

Binomial name
- Coracina fortis (Salvadori, 1878)

= Buru cuckooshrike =

Species of bird

The Buru cuckooshrike (Coracina fortis) is a species of bird in the family Campephagidae. It is endemic to Indonesia.

Its natural habitats are subtropical or tropical moist lowland forests and subtropical or tropical moist montane forests. It is threatened by habitat loss.
