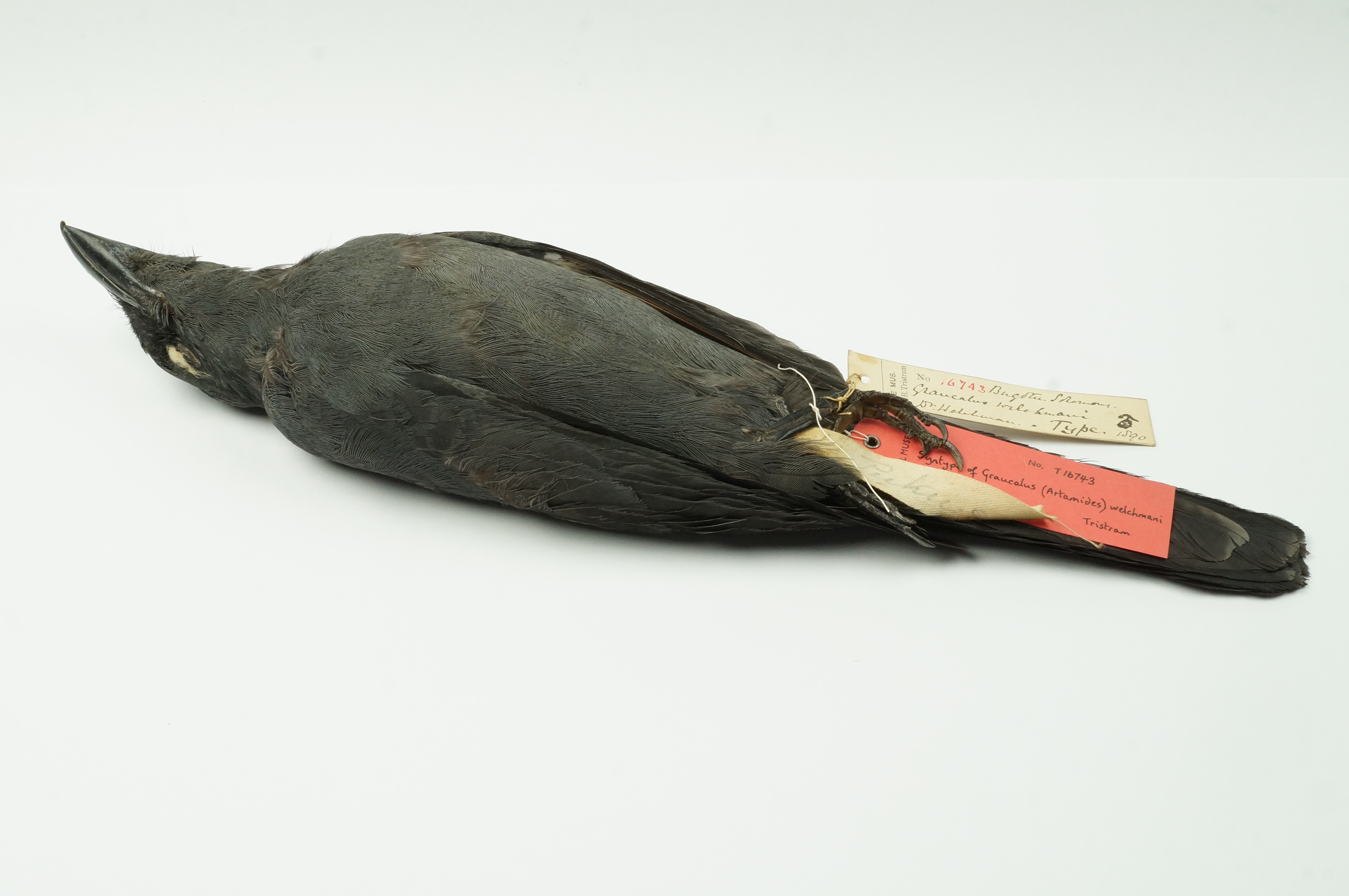
- Museum specimen, adult male

Conservation status
- Least Concern (IUCN 3.1)

Scientific classification
- Kingdom: Animalia
- Phylum: Chordata
- Class: Aves
- Order: Passeriformes
- Family: Campephagidae
- Genus: Coracina
- Species: C. welchmani

Binomial name
- Coracina welchmani (Tristram, 1892)

= North Melanesian cuckooshrike =

Species of bird

The north Melanesian cuckooshrike (Coracina welchmani) is a species of bird in the cuckooshrike family. It is endemic to the Solomon Islands archipelago. It is considered by some ornithologists to be a subspecies of Coracina caledonica. Its natural habitats are subtropical or tropical moist lowland forests and subtropical or tropical moist montane forests.

== Taxonomy ==
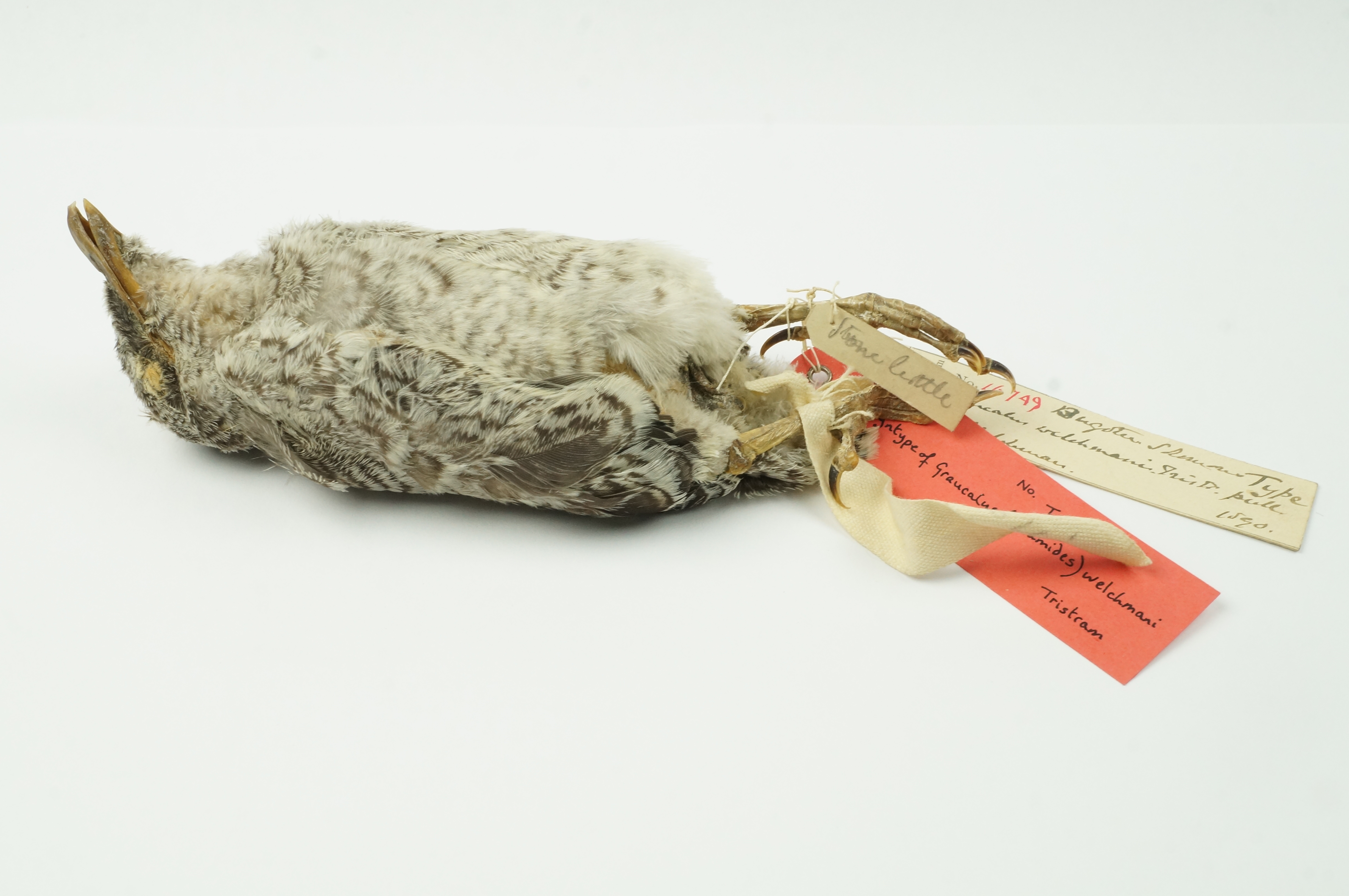
Syntype of Graucalus (Artamides) welchmani Tristram (NML-VZ T16749) held at World Museum, National Museums Liverpool

The syntypes of Graucalus (Artamides) welchmani Tristram (Ibis, 1891, p.294), an adult male and a pullus, is held in the vertebrate zoology collection of National Museums Liverpool at World Museum, with accession numbers NML-VZ T16743 and NML-VZ T16749. The specimen was collected in Bugotu Island, Solomon Islands in December 1870 by Dr. Welchman. The specimen came to the Liverpool national collection came to the Liverpool national collection through the purchase of Canon Henry Baker Tristram's collection by the museum in 1896.
