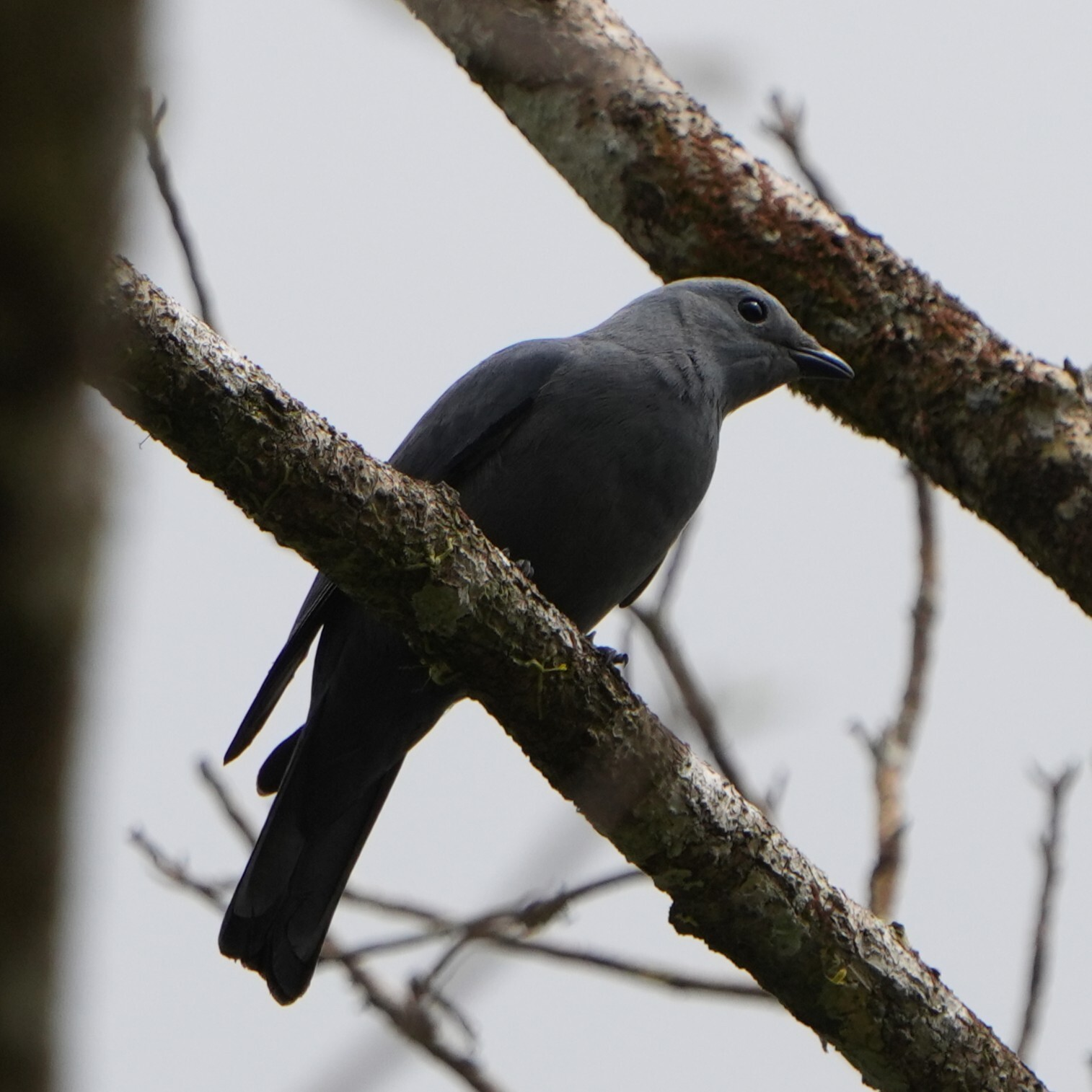

Conservation status
- Least Concern (IUCN 3.1)

Scientific classification
- Kingdom: Animalia
- Phylum: Chordata
- Class: Aves
- Order: Passeriformes
- Family: Campephagidae
- Genus: Coracina
- Species: C. boyeri

Binomial name
- Coracina boyeri (G.R. Gray, 1846)

= Boyer's cuckooshrike =

Species of bird

Boyer's cuckooshrike (Coracina boyeri) is a species of bird in the family Campephagidae. It is widely spread across New Guinea. Its natural habitats are subtropical or tropical moist lowland forests and subtropical or tropical mangrove forests.

The common name and Latin binomial commemorate the French explorer Joseph Emmanuel P. Boyer.

== Subspecies ==
- C. b. boyeri: can be distinguished by the female's lores being white
- C. b. subalaris: can be distinguished by the female's lores being gray
