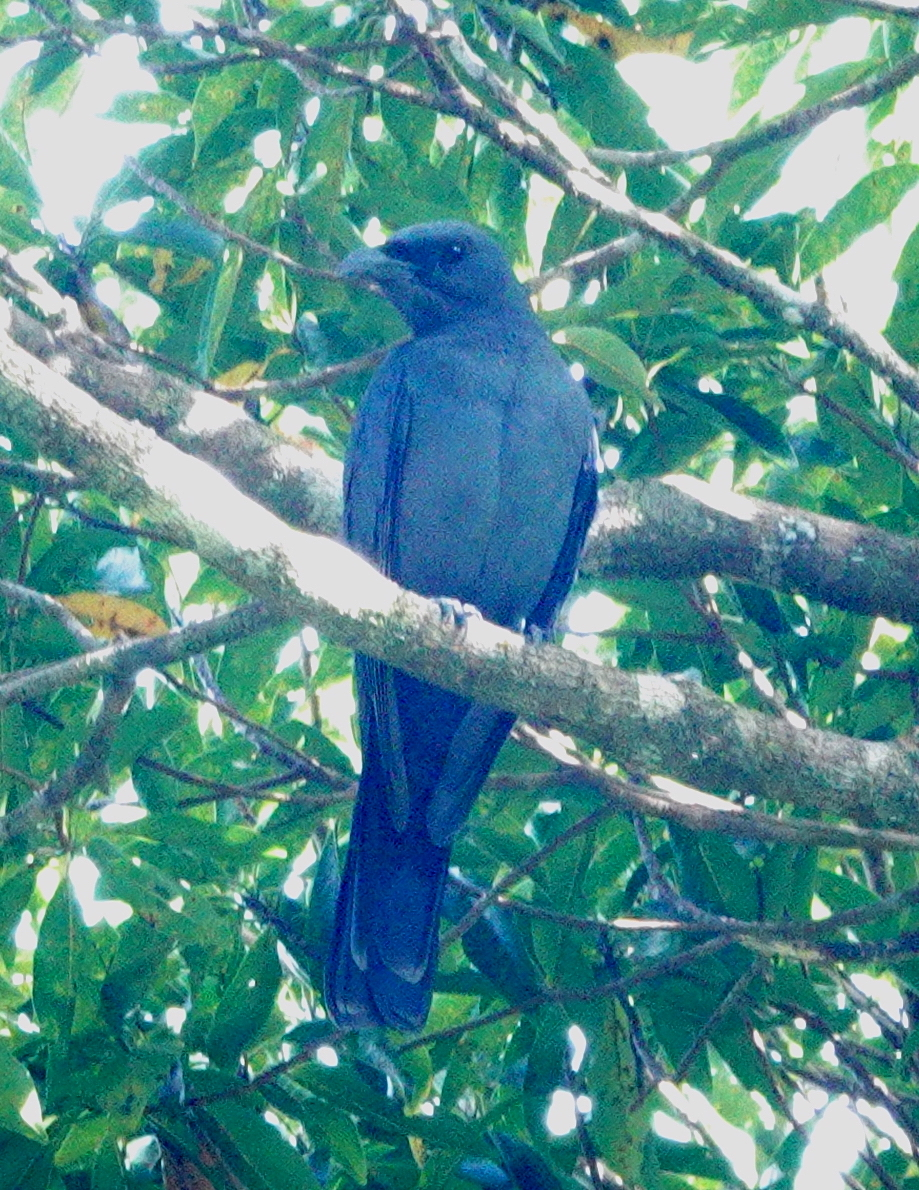
- Kai subspecies
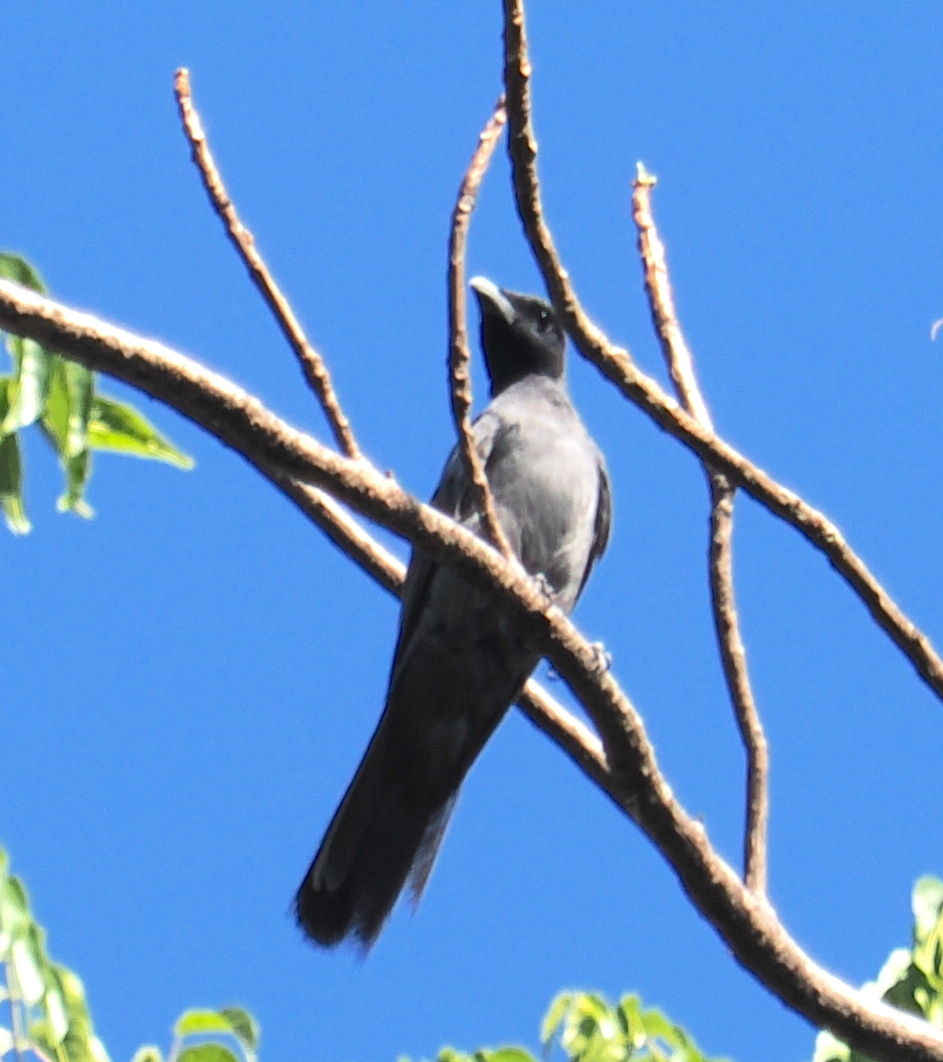
- Timor subspecies

Conservation status
- Least Concern (IUCN 3.1)

Scientific classification
- Kingdom: Animalia
- Phylum: Chordata
- Class: Aves
- Order: Passeriformes
- Family: Campephagidae
- Genus: Coracina
- Species: C. personata

Binomial name
- Coracina personata (Müller, 1843)

= Wallacean cuckooshrike =

Species of bird

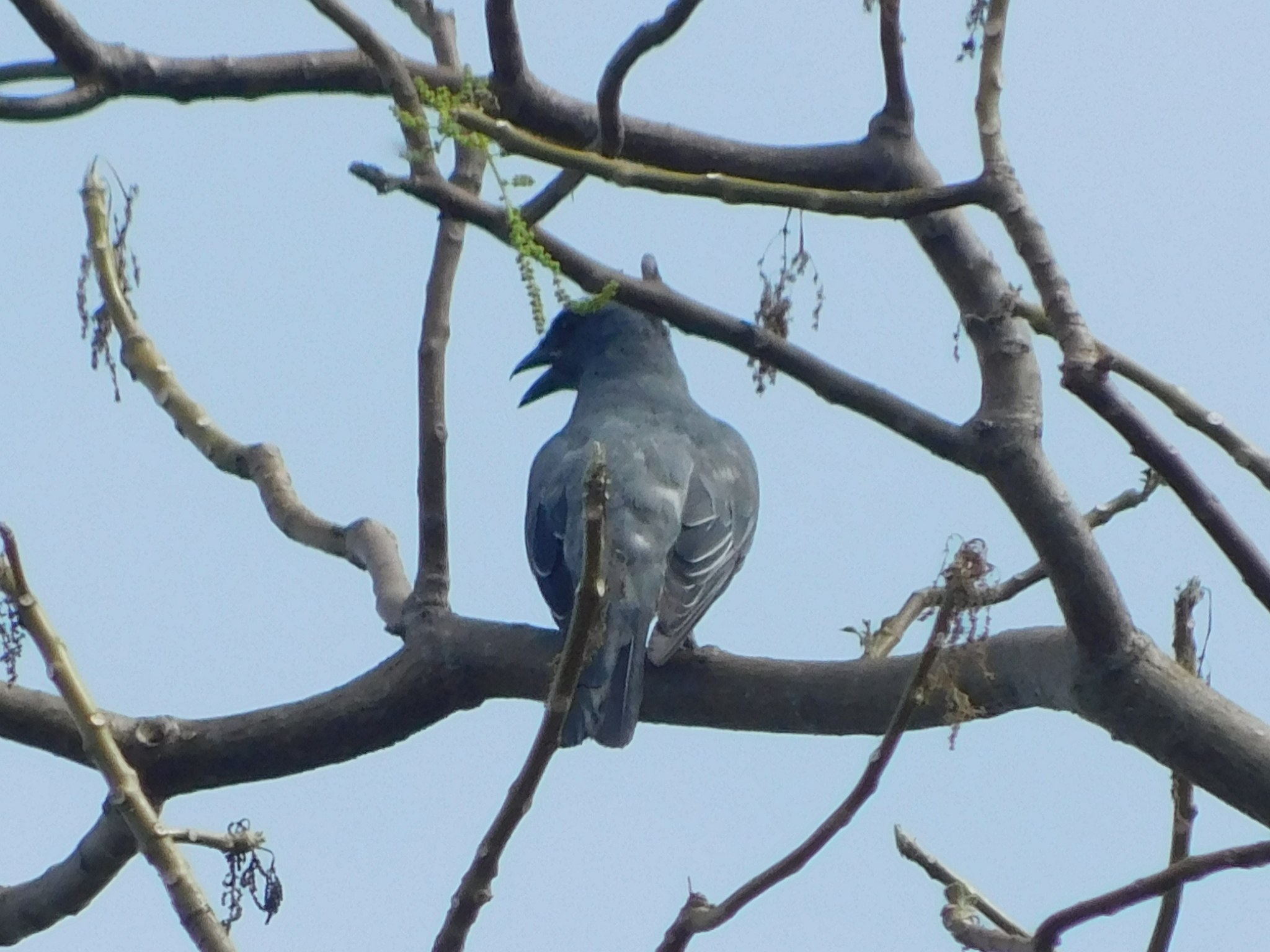
Flores subspecies

The Wallacean cuckooshrike (Coracina personata) is a species of bird in the family Campephagidae. It is found in the Lesser Sunda Islands and the Kai Islands. It is endemic to Indonesia.

Its natural habitat is subtropical or tropical moist lowland forest.
