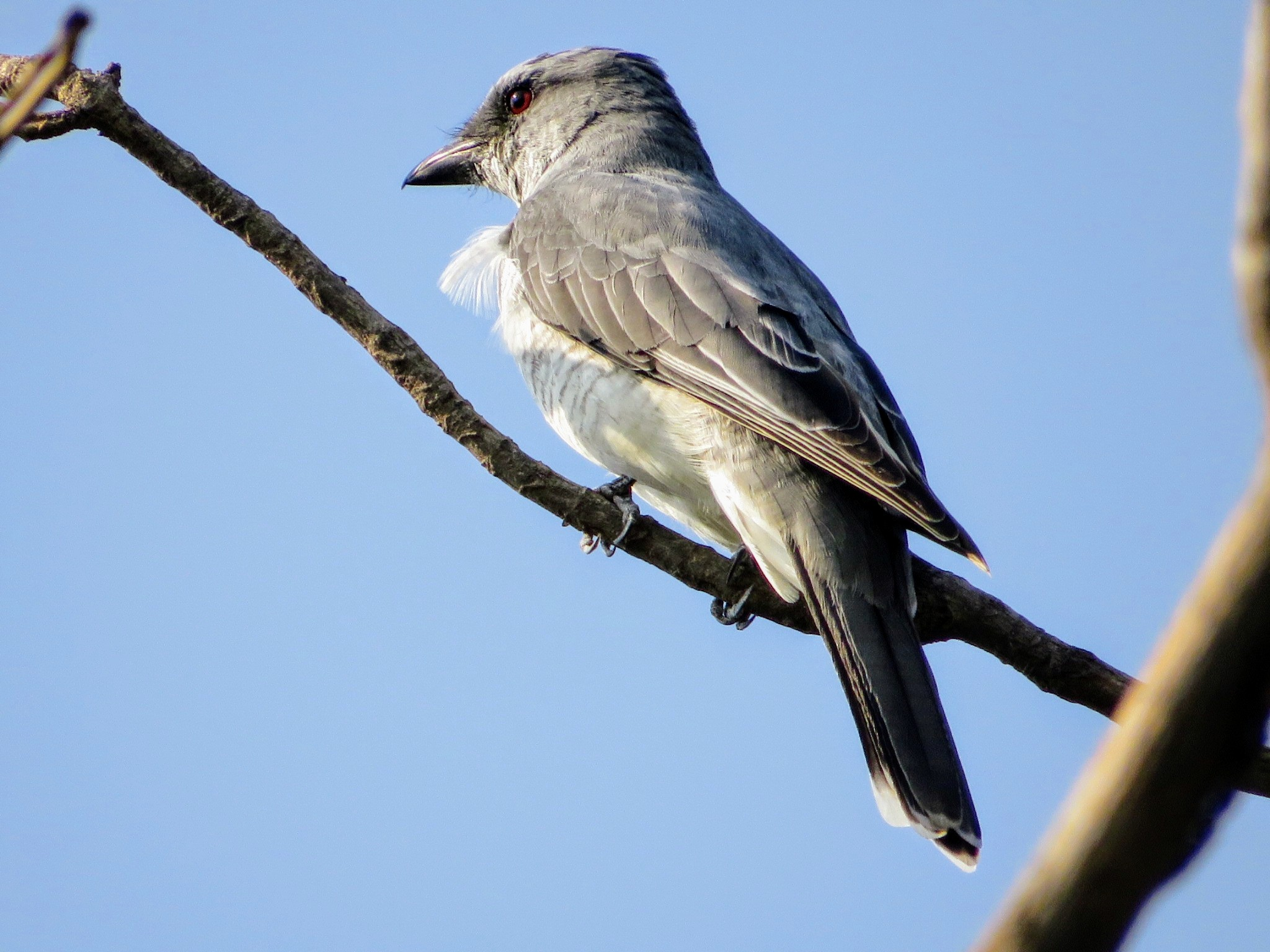
- Adult on tree

Conservation status
- Least Concern (IUCN 3.1)

Scientific classification
- Kingdom: Animalia
- Phylum: Chordata
- Class: Aves
- Order: Passeriformes
- Family: Campephagidae
- Genus: Coracina
- Species: C. macei

Binomial name
- Coracina macei (Lesson, 1831)

Synonyms
- Graucalus macei Lesson, 1831

= Indian cuckooshrike =

Species of bird

The Indian cuckooshrike (Coracina macei) is a species of bird in the cuckooshrike family Campephagidae that is found on the Indian subcontinent. Formerly under the English name "large cuckooshrike" this species included many subspecies and had a large range that included Southeast Asia.

== Taxonomy ==
Two subspecies are recognised

- C. m. macei (Lesson, RP, 1831) – central, south India
- C. m. layardi (Blyth, 1866) – Sri Lanka

The Indian cuckooshrike formerly included additional subspecies (under the English name "large cuckooshrike"):

- Oriental cuckooshrike now includes 5 former subspecies of the large cuckooshrike.
- Malayan cuckooshrike was formerly a subspecies of the large cuckooshrike.

== Description ==
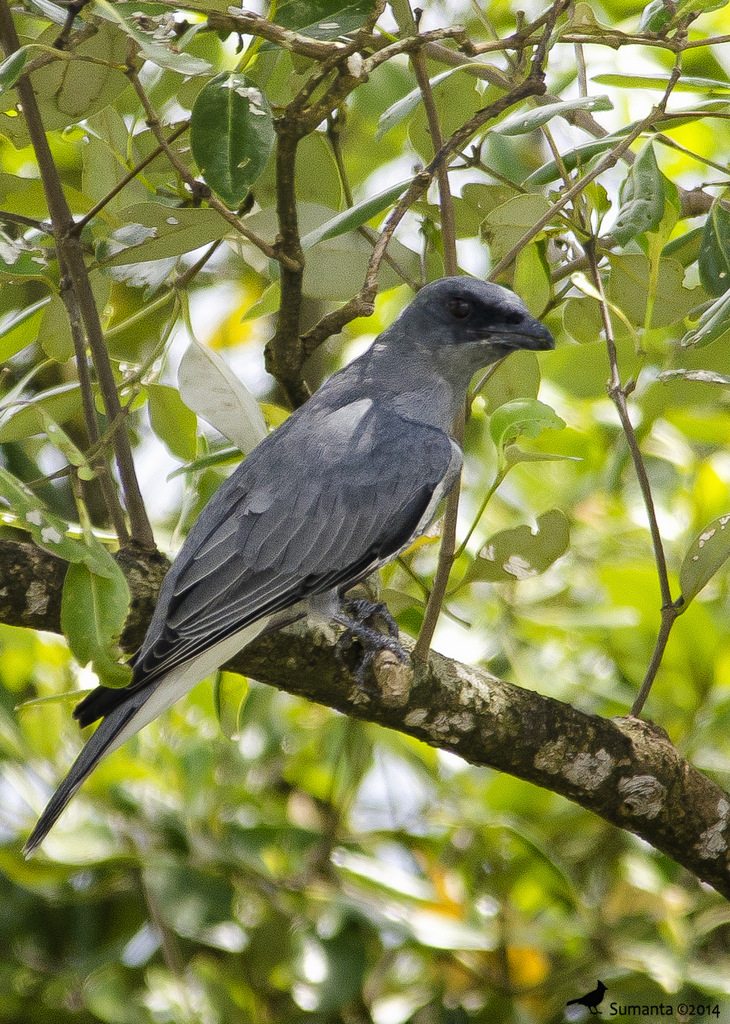
A male from West Bengal

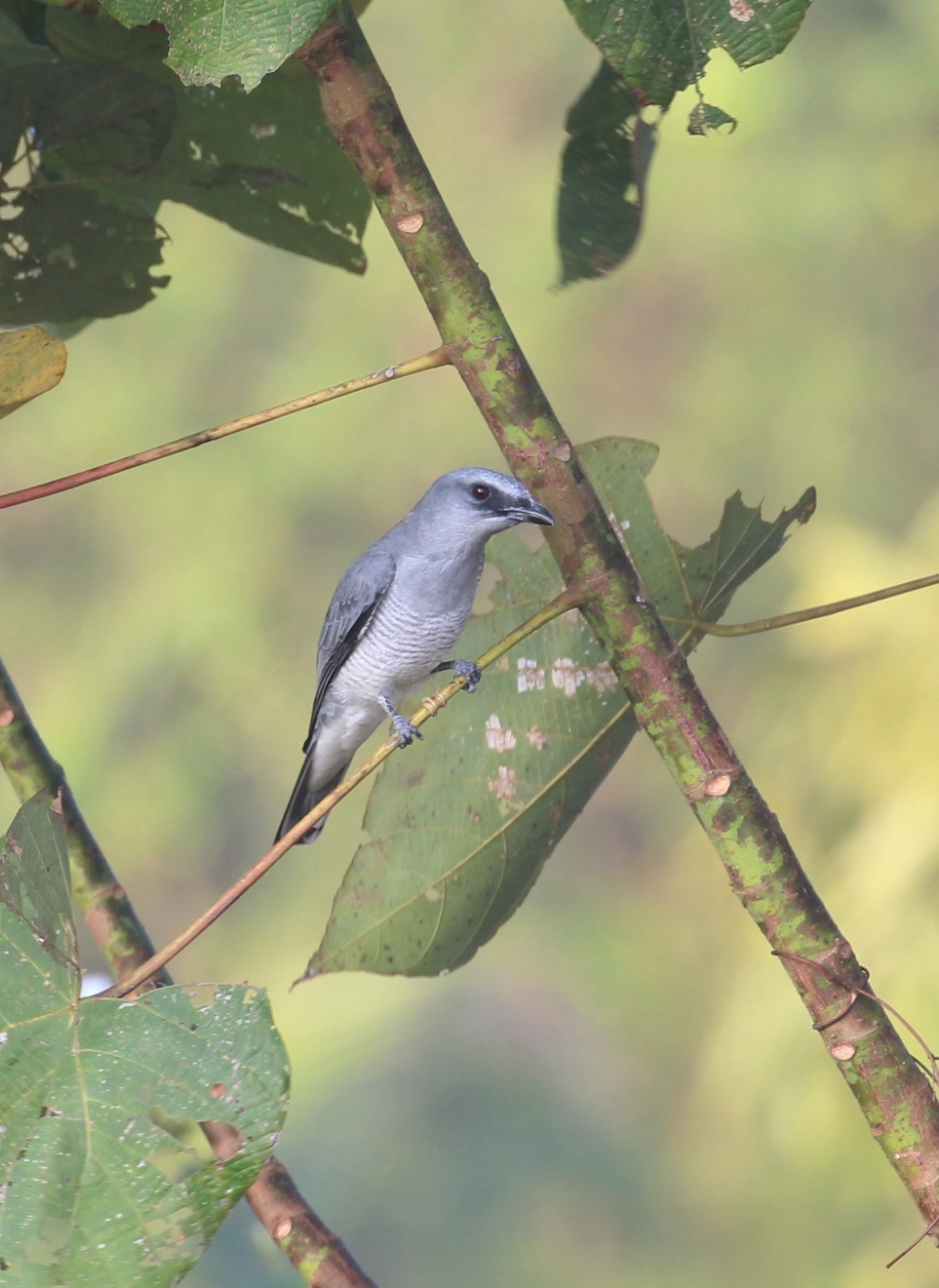
Indian cuckooshrike or Large cuckooshrike

Adult males have a broad and well-marked eye stripe which is pale in females. The throat and breast are grey in males and the abdomen and flanks are finely barred. Females have the throat and breast also with barring which extends further down and lacks the prominent whitish vent of the male. They are mostly insectivorous but also feed on figs and forest fruits and usually fly in small groups with a bounding flight just above the forest canopy. The Indian population has a loud call klu-eep and the birds have a characteristic habit of flicking their closed wings one after the other upon landing on a perch. The same wing movements are also used during courtship.

== Breeding ==
The species breeds in the dry months of winter. The nest is a shallow saucer placed in the fork of a horizontal branch at some height above the ground. The saucer is made of twigs and grass decorated on the outside with cobwebs and with little lining. The typical clutch is three eggs in peninsular India and two around Bengal.
