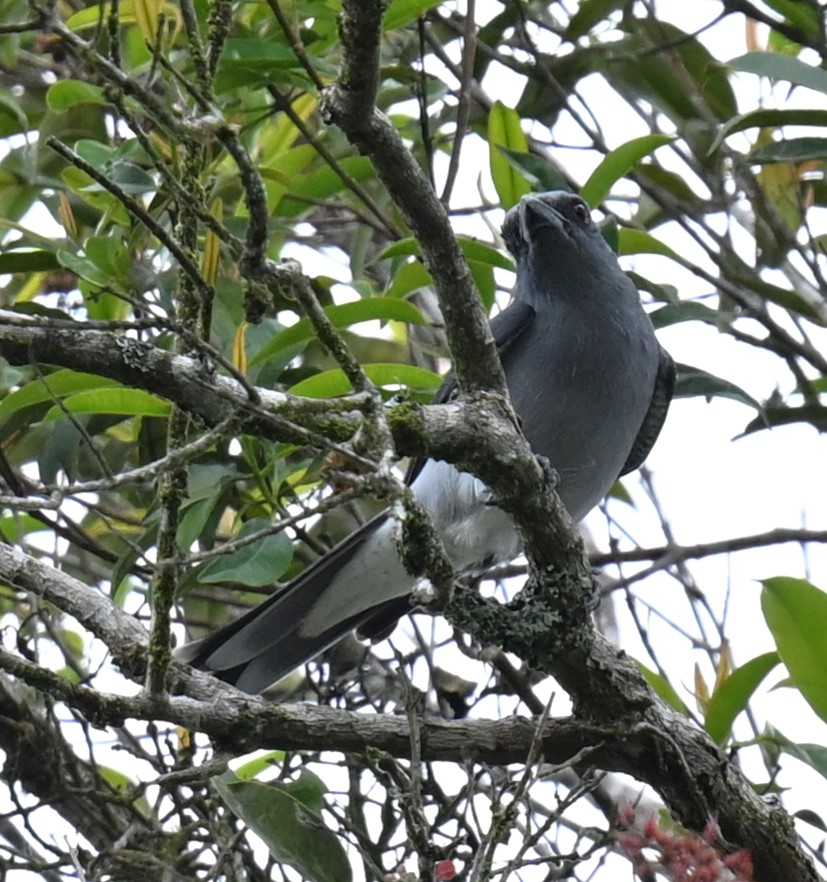

Conservation status
- Not evaluated (IUCN 3.1)

Scientific classification
- Kingdom: Animalia
- Phylum: Chordata
- Class: Aves
- Order: Passeriformes
- Family: Campephagidae
- Genus: Coracina
- Species: C. larutensis

Binomial name
- Coracina larutensis (Sharpe, 1887)

= Malaysian cuckooshrike =

Species of bird

The Malaysian cuckooshrike or Malayan cuckooshrike (Coracina larutensis) is a passerine bird in the family Campephagidae that is found on the Malay Peninsula. The species was formerly considered to be a subspecies of the large cuckooshrike, now renamed the Indian cuckooshrike.

== Taxonomy ==
The Malaysian cuckooshrike was formally described in 1887 by the English ornithologist Richard Bowdler Sharpe based on specimens collected in the Larut Range, Malay Peninsula, by the naturalist and museum curator Leonard Wray. Sharpe coined the binomial name Artamides larutensis. The species was formerly treated as a subspecies of the large cuckooshrike (Coracina macei), now renamed the Indian cuckooshrike. It was promoted to species status based on the differences in morphology and vocalizations. The species is monotypic: no subspecies are recognised.
