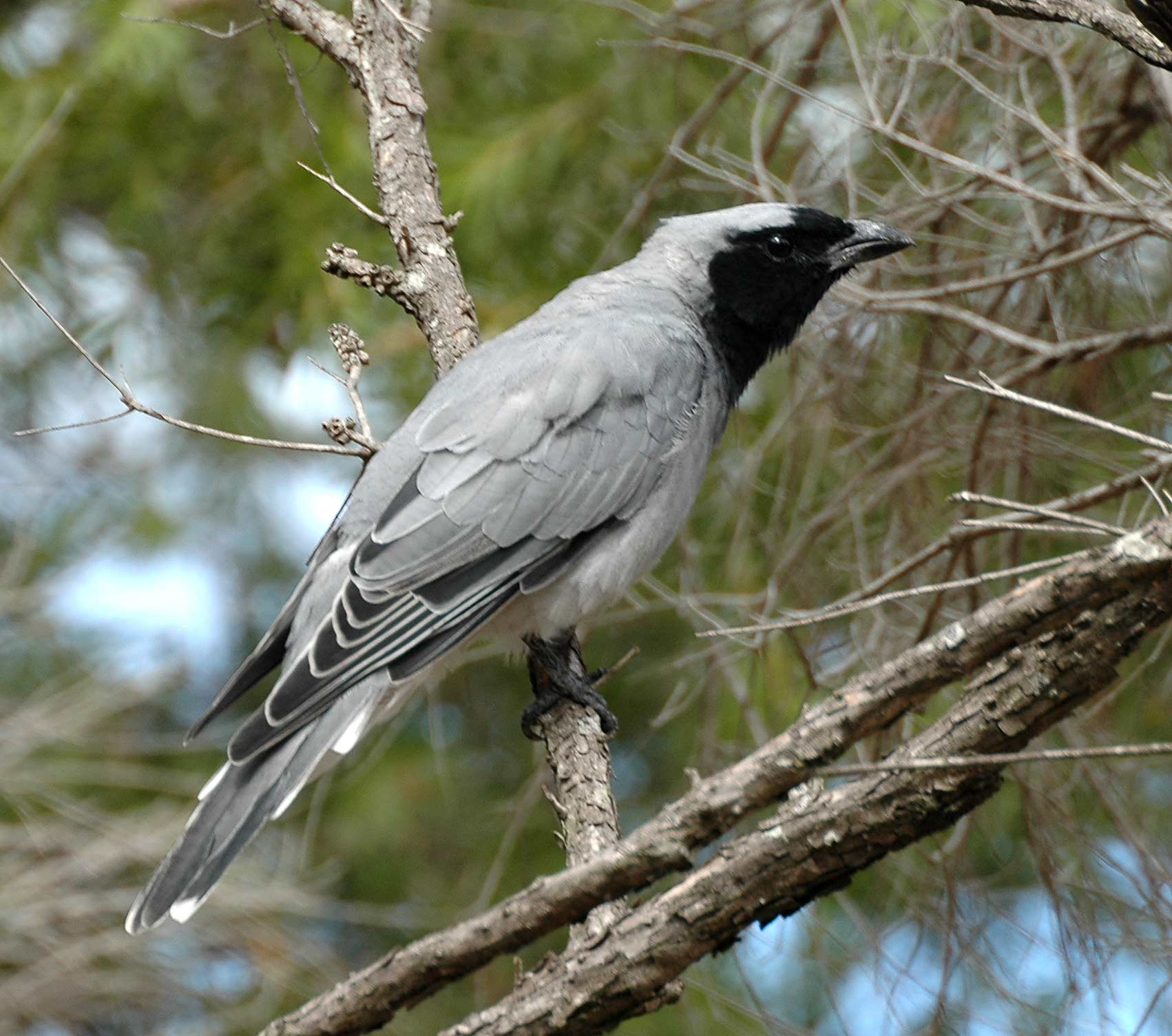
- Black-faced cuckooshrike (Coracina novaehollandiae)

Scientific classification
- Kingdom: Animalia
- Phylum: Chordata
- Class: Aves
- Order: Passeriformes
- Family: Campephagidae
- Genus: Coracina; Vieillot, 1816

Type species
- Corvus papuaensis Gmelin, JF, 1788

Species
- see article.

= Coracina =

Genus of birds

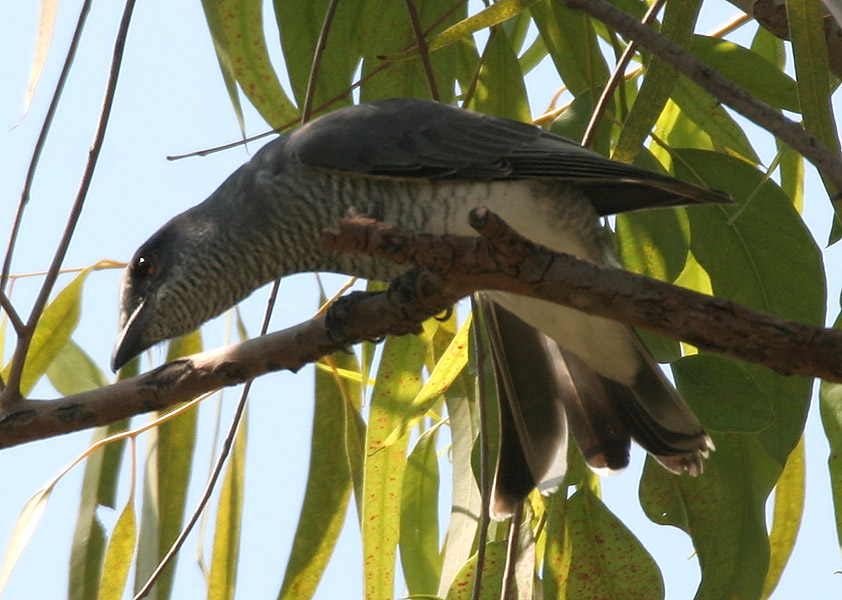
Large cuckooshrike (Coracina macei)

Coracina is a large genus of birds in the cuckooshrike family Campephagidae.

== Taxonomy ==
The genus was introduced by the French ornithologist Louis Pierre Vieillot in 1816. The type species was subsequently designated as the white-bellied cuckooshrike by the German ornithologist Jean Cabanis in 1850–1851. The name Coracina is from the Ancient Greek korakinos meaning "little raven", a diminutive of korax meaning "raven".

The genus formerly included many more species. It was split based on the results of a molecular phylogenetic study published in 2010. A major clade was moved to the resurrected genus Edolisoma and a smaller group of Asian and Indian Ocean species moved to the genus Lalage.

The genus contains the following 27 species:

- Stout-billed cuckooshrike, Coracina caeruleogrisea
- Hooded cuckooshrike, Coracina longicauda
- Cerulean cuckooshrike, Coracina temminckii
- Pied cuckooshrike, Coracina bicolor
- Ground cuckooshrike, Coracina maxima
- Barred cuckooshrike, Coracina lineata
- Black-faced cuckooshrike, Coracina novaehollandiae
- Boyer's cuckooshrike, Coracina boyeri
- Buru cuckooshrike, Coracina fortis
- Wallacean cuckooshrike, Coracina personata
- North Melanesian cuckooshrike, Coracina welchmani (split from C. caledonica)
- South Melanesian cuckooshrike, Coracina caledonica (formerly Melanesian cuckooshrike before split)
- Bar-bellied cuckooshrike, Coracina striata
- Mindoro cuckooshrike, Coracina mindorensis (split from C. striata)
- Visayan cuckooshrike, Coracina panayensis (split from C. striata)
- Mindanao cuckooshrike, Coracina kochii (split from C. striata)
- Sulu cuckooshrike, Coracina guillemardi (split from C. striata)
- Indian cuckooshrike, Coracina macei (formerly large cuckooshrike before spit)
- Oriental cuckooshrike, Coracina javensis (formerly Javan cuckooshrike. Includes 5 subspecies previously in C. macei)
- Malaysian cuckooshrike, Coracina larutensis (split from C. macei)
- Andaman cuckooshrike, Coracina dobsoni
- Slaty cuckooshrike, Coracina schistacea
- White-rumped cuckooshrike, Coracina leucopygia
- Sunda cuckooshrike, Coracina larvata
- White-bellied cuckooshrike, Coracina papuensis
- Moluccan cuckooshrike, Coracina atriceps
- Halmahera cuckooshrike, Coracina parvula
