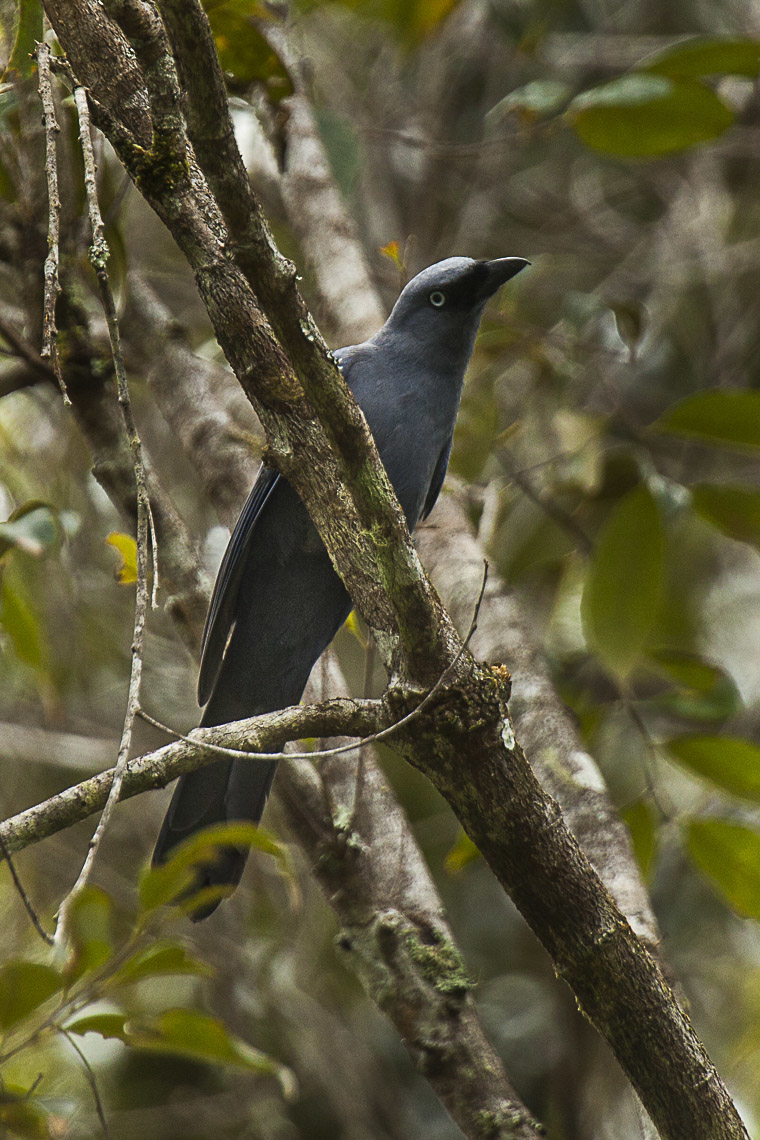

Conservation status
- Least Concern (IUCN 3.1)

Scientific classification
- Kingdom: Animalia
- Phylum: Chordata
- Class: Aves
- Order: Passeriformes
- Family: Campephagidae
- Genus: Coracina
- Species: C. temminckii

Binomial name
- Coracina temminckii (Müller, S, 1843)

Synonyms
- Ceblepyris Temminckii

= Cerulean cuckooshrike =

Species of bird

Cerulean Cuckooshrike, feeding

The cerulean cuckooshrike (Coracina temminckii) is a species of bird in the family Campephagidae. It is endemic to the island of Sulawesi in Indonesia. Its natural habitats are subtropical or tropical moist lowland forest and subtropical or tropical moist montane forest. Other common names for this bird include the Sulawesi cuckooshrike, the Celebes cuckooshrike and Temminck's cuckooshrike.

== Taxonomy ==
The cerulean cuckooshrike was first described by the German naturalist Salomon Müller in 1843. The specific name honours the Dutch zoologist and ornithologist Coenraad Jacob Temminck, the director of the National Natural History Museum at Leiden who had sent Müller to the East Indies to collect specimens. Three subspecies are recognised; C. t. temminckii from the northern peninsula of Sulawesi, C. t. rileyi from central and southeastern Sulawesi and C. t. tonkeana from eastern Sulawesi.

== Description ==
The adult cerulean cuckooshrike is a distinctive bird and is about 30 cm (12 in) long. The male is greyish-blue, tinged with cobalt blue on wings and tail.

== Biology ==
The cerulean cuckooshrike inhabits primary forest and mature secondary forest up to an altitude of about 2,000 metres (6,600 ft). It often forms small groups and is presumed to feed on insects. Little is known of its breeding habits but juveniles have been seen in October. One of the places where this bird can be seen is the Gunung Ambang Nature Reserve.

== Status ==
The cerulean cuckooshrike is common in suitable habitats over a large part of central Sulawesi but rather less common in the north and east of the island. The population appears to be stable, and despite its restricted range, the IUCN lists the bird as being of "least concern".
