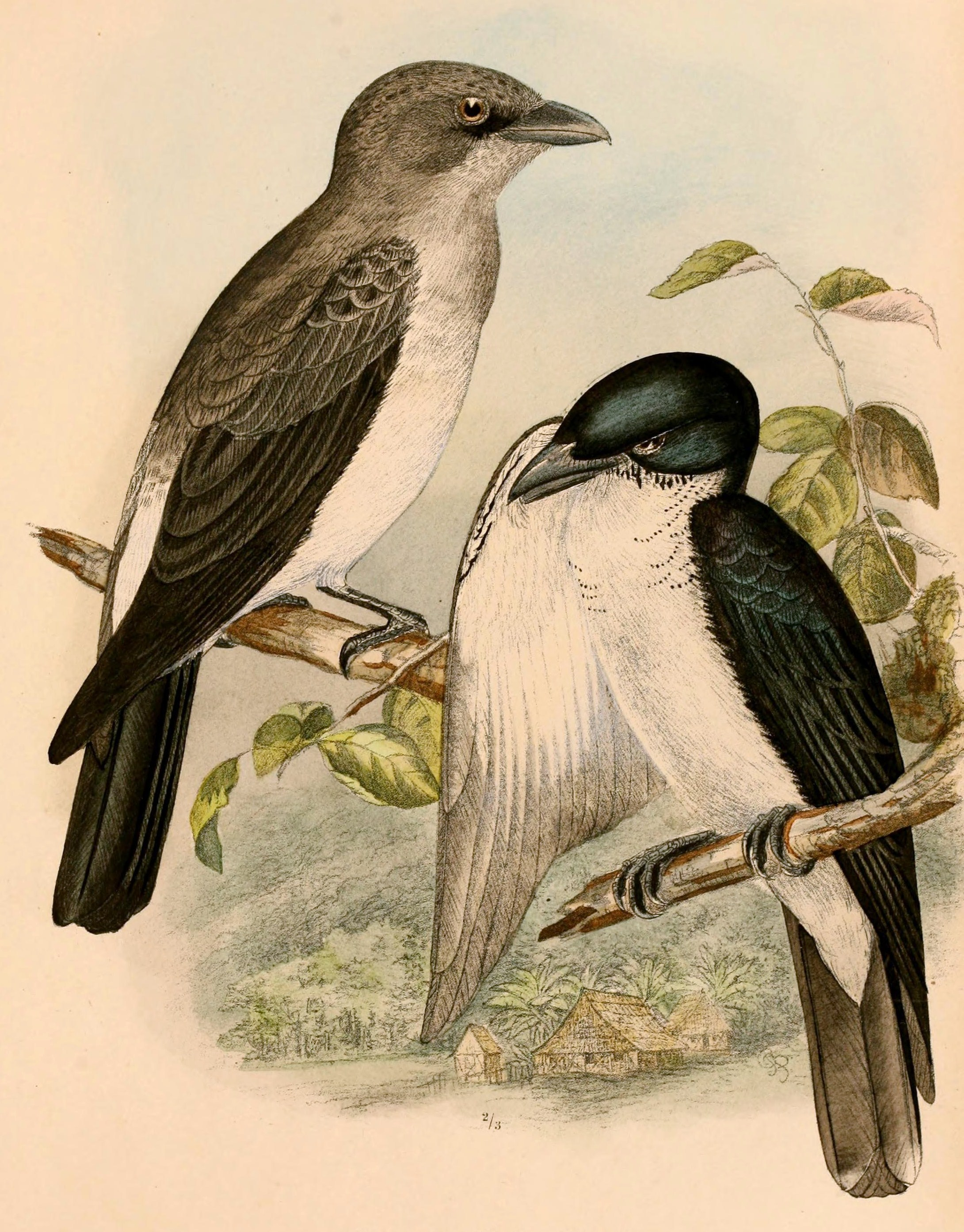

Conservation status
- Near Threatened (IUCN 3.1)

Scientific classification
- Kingdom: Animalia
- Phylum: Chordata
- Class: Aves
- Order: Passeriformes
- Family: Campephagidae
- Genus: Coracina
- Species: C. bicolor

Binomial name
- Coracina bicolor (Temminck, 1824)

= Pied cuckooshrike =

Species of bird

Pied Cuckooshrike in Sulawesi

The pied cuckooshrike (Coracina bicolor) is a species of bird in the family Campephagidae. It is endemic to Indonesia, where it is found in Sulawesi. Its natural habitats are subtropical or tropical moist lowland forest and subtropical or tropical mangrove forest. It is threatened by habitat loss.

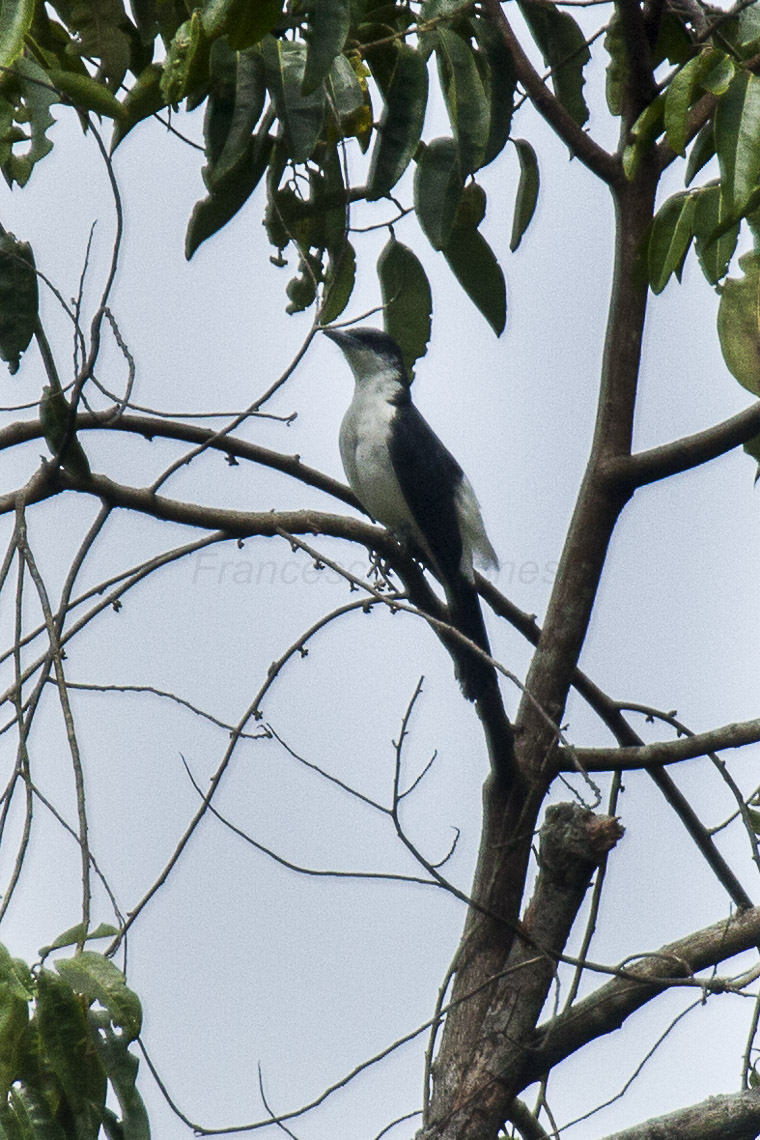
