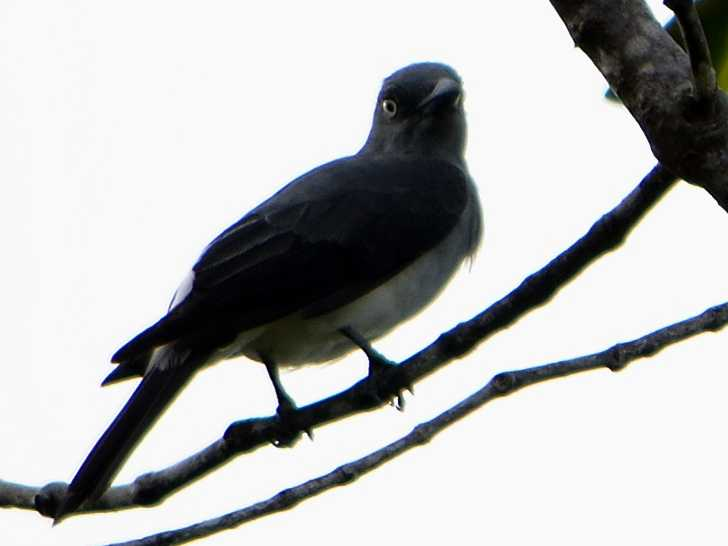

Conservation status
- Least Concern (IUCN 3.1)

Scientific classification
- Kingdom: Animalia
- Phylum: Chordata
- Class: Aves
- Order: Passeriformes
- Family: Campephagidae
- Genus: Coracina
- Species: C. leucopygia

Binomial name
- Coracina leucopygia (Bonaparte, 1850)

= White-rumped cuckooshrike =

Species of bird

The white-rumped cuckooshrike (Coracina leucopygia) is a species of bird in the family Campephagidae. It is endemic to Sulawesi, Indonesia.
