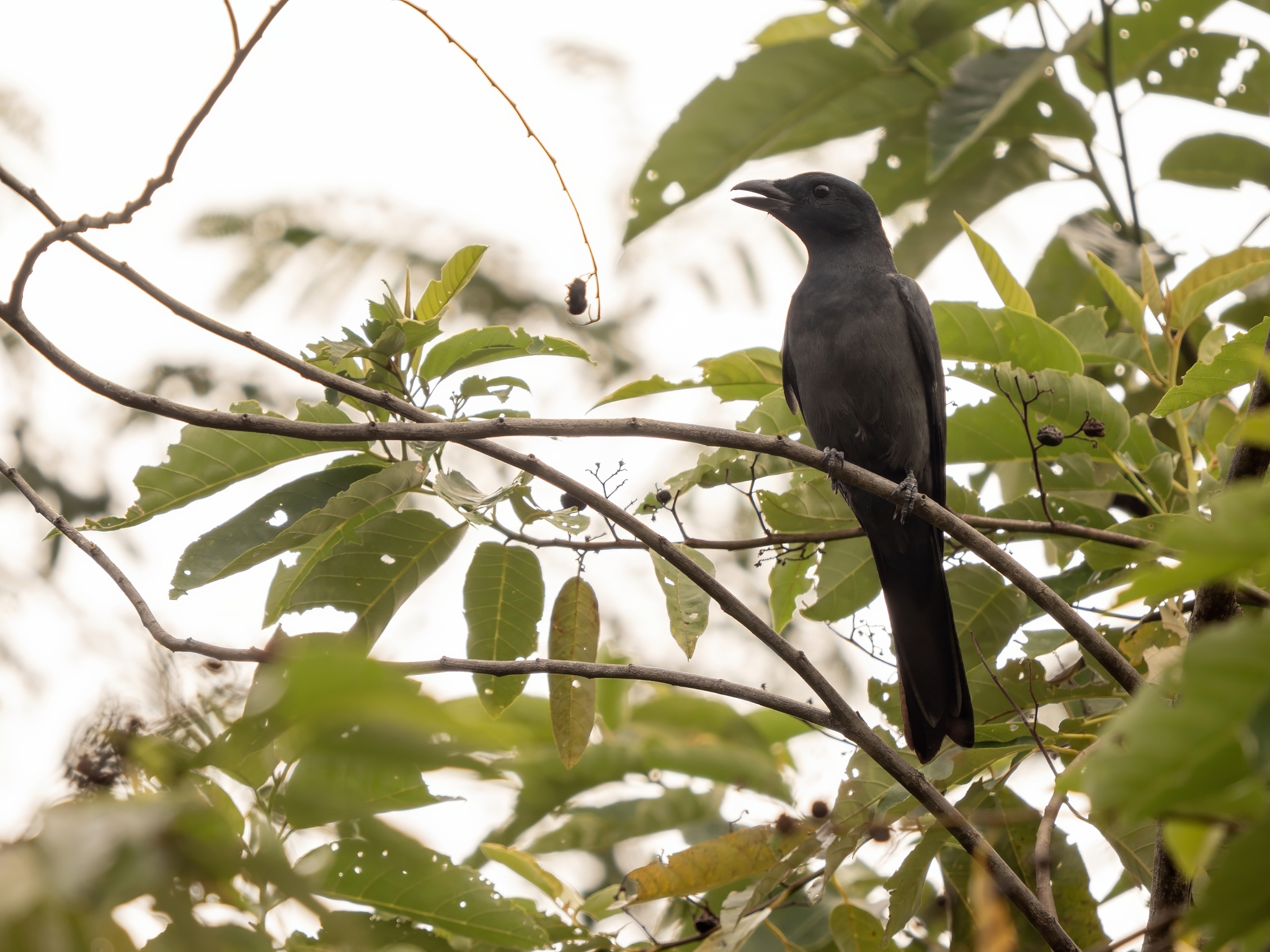

Conservation status
- Least Concern (IUCN 3.1)

Scientific classification
- Kingdom: Animalia
- Phylum: Chordata
- Class: Aves
- Order: Passeriformes
- Family: Campephagidae
- Genus: Coracina
- Species: C. schistacea

Binomial name
- Coracina schistacea (Sharpe, 1878)

Synonyms
- Artamides schistaceus (protonym)

= Slaty cuckooshrike =

Species of bird

The slaty cuckooshrike (Coracina schistacea) is a species of bird in the family Campephagidae. It is endemic to Indonesia, where it occurs in the Sula and Banggai Islands. Its natural habitats are subtropical or tropical moist lowland forest and subtropical or tropical mangrove forest.
