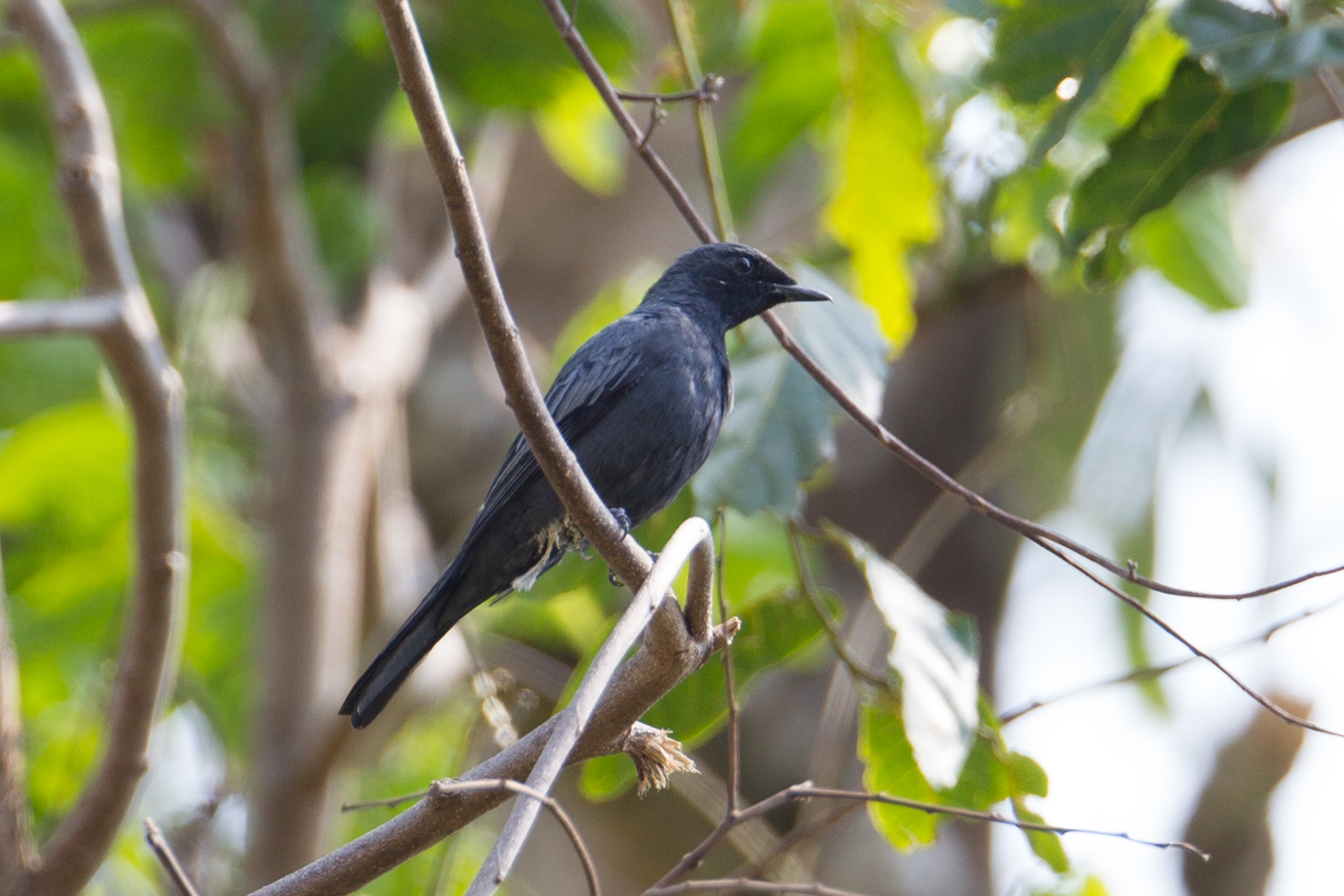

Conservation status
- Least Concern (IUCN 3.1)

Scientific classification
- Kingdom: Animalia
- Phylum: Chordata
- Class: Aves
- Order: Passeriformes
- Family: Campephagidae
- Genus: Edolisoma
- Species: E. morio

Binomial name
- Edolisoma morio (Müller, 1843)

Synonyms
- Coracina morio

= Sulawesi cicadabird =

Species of bird

The Sulawesi cicadabird (Edolisoma morio) is a species of bird in the family Campephagidae. It is endemic to Sulawesi in Indonesia. Its natural habitats are subtropical or tropical moist lowland forests and subtropical or tropical moist montane forests. The species is placed in the reinstated genus Edolisoma by some authors and the nominate subspecies E. morio morio was suggested to be part of the Edolisoma tenuirostre complex in a molecular phylogenetic study by Pedersen et al. (2018). The species was formerly considered to be conspecific with the Sangihe cicadabird.
