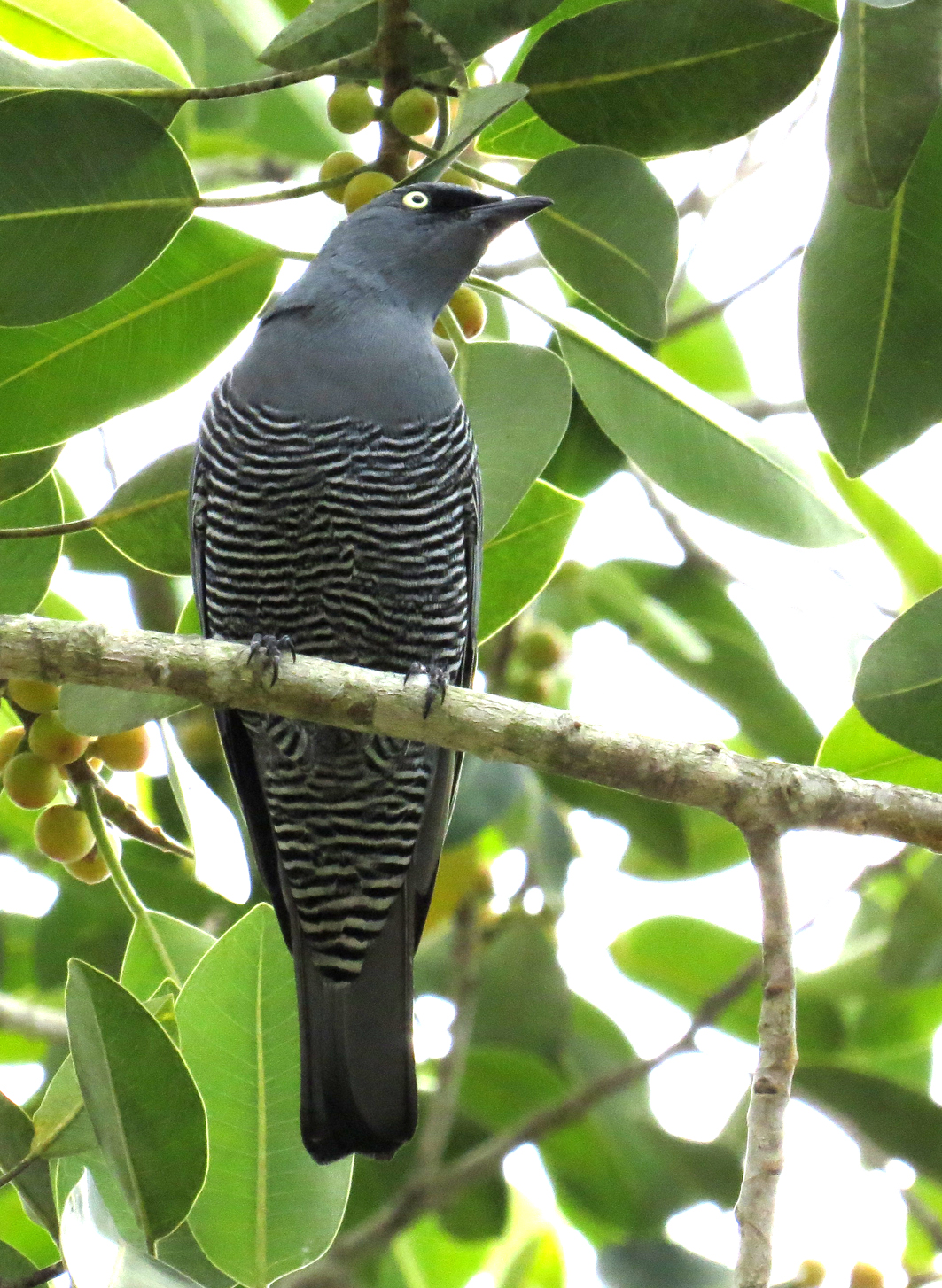

Conservation status
- Least Concern (IUCN 3.1)

Scientific classification
- Kingdom: Animalia
- Phylum: Chordata
- Class: Aves
- Order: Passeriformes
- Family: Campephagidae
- Genus: Coracina
- Species: C. lineata

Binomial name
- Coracina lineata (Swainson, 1825)

= Barred cuckooshrike =

Species of bird

The barred cuckooshrike (Coracina lineata), also called the yellow-eyed cuckooshrike, is a species of bird in the family Campephagidae. It is found in eastern Australia, Indonesia, Papua New Guinea, and Solomon Islands.

== Taxonomy ==
=== Subspecies ===
- Coracina lineata lineata: Northeast Australia (east Cape York Peninsula to northeast New South Wales)
- Coracina lineata axillaris: Mountains of central New Guinea and Waigeo Island.
- Coracina lineata maforensis: Numfor Island (New Guinea)
- Coracina lineata sublineata: Bismarck Archipelago (New Ireland and New Britain)
- Coracina lineata nigrifrons: Solomon Islands (Bougainville, Choiseul and Santa Isabel)
- Coracina lineata ombriosa: Solomon Is. (Kolombangara, New Georgia Group and Rendova)
- Coracina lineata pusilla: Guadalcanal (Solomon Islands)
- Coracina lineata malaitae: Malaita (Solomon Islands)
- Coracina lineata makirae: Makira (Solomon Islands)
- Coracina lineata gracilis: Rennell (Solomon Islands)

The holotype of Graucalus nigrifrons Tristram (Ibis, 1892, p. 294), an adult male, is held in the vertebrate zoology collection of National Museums Liverpool at World Museum, with accession number NML-VZ T16744. The specimen was collected in Bugotu, Solomon Islands, in 1890 by Dr. Welchman. The specimen came to the Liverpool national collection through the purchase of Canon Henry Baker Tristram's collection by the museum in 1896.

== Gallery ==
Rush Creek, SE Queensland, Australia

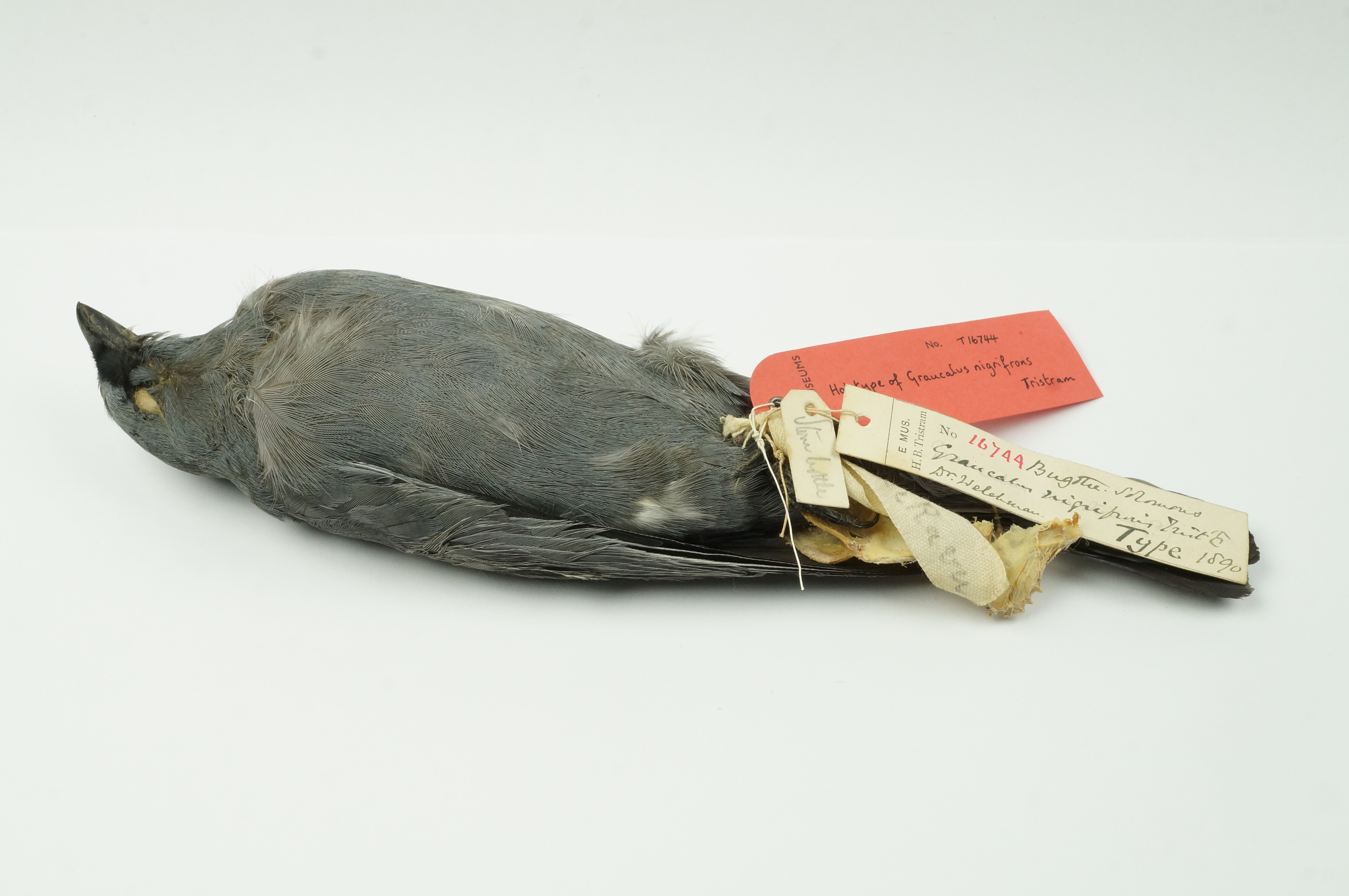
Holotype of Graucalus nigrifrons Tristram (NML-VZ T16744) held at World Museum, National Museums Liverpool
