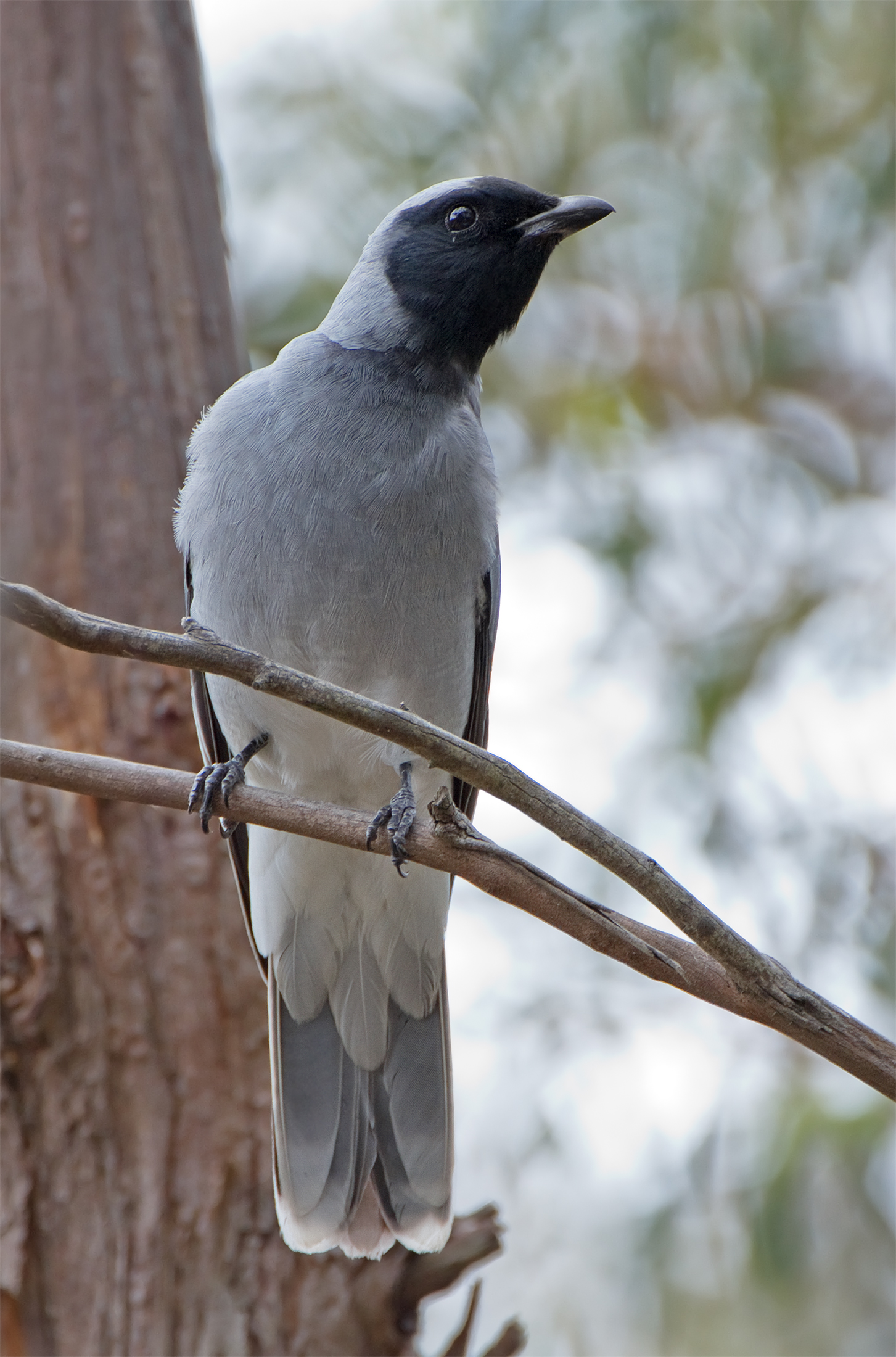

Conservation status
- Least Concern (IUCN 3.1)

Scientific classification
- Kingdom: Animalia
- Phylum: Chordata
- Class: Aves
- Order: Passeriformes
- Family: Campephagidae
- Genus: Coracina
- Species: C. novaehollandiae

Binomial name
- Coracina novaehollandiae (Gmelin, JF, 1789)
- Natural range

Synonyms
- Turdus novaehollandiae Gmelin, 1789; Graucalus parvirostris Gould, 1838; Coracina melanops tasmanica Mathews, 1911

= Black-faced cuckooshrike =

Species of bird

The black-faced cuckooshrike (Coracina novaehollandiae) is a common omnivorous passerine bird native to Australia and southern New Guinea. It has a protected status in New South Wales, under the National Parks and Wildlife Act, 1974.

They are widely distributed in almost any wooded habitat throughout the region, except in rainforests. But they can also occur in urban areas, and are a fairly common sight on power lines in Australian cities such as Sydney and Perth.

== Taxonomy ==
The black-faced cuckooshrike was formally described in 1789 by the German naturalist Johann Friedrich Gmelin in his revised and expanded edition of Carl Linnaeus's Systema Naturae. He placed it with the thrushes in the genus Turdus and coined the binomial name Turdus novaehollandiae. Gmelin based his description on the "New Holland thrush" that had been described in 1783 by the English ornithologist John Latham in his book A General Synopsis of Birds. Lathan had examined a specimen in the collection of the naturalist Joseph Banks that had come from Adventure Bay in southern Tasmania. Adventure Bay had been visited by Captain James Cook in January 1777 on his third voyage to the Pacific Ocean. A painting of the black-faced cuckooshrike by William Ellis that was made during this visit is in the collection of the Natural History Museum in London. In 1921 Gregory Mathews recognised that Gmelin's Turdus novaehollandiae and Latham's "New Holland thrush" corresponded to the black-faced cuckooshrike. It is now one of 22 species placed in the genus Coracina that was introduced in 1816 by French ornithologist Louis Pierre Vieillot.

Three subspecies are recognised:

- C. n. subpallida Mathews, 1912 – central west Western Australia (central west Australia)
- C. n. melanops (Latham, 1801) – southwest, south, north, east Australia and central south coast of southeast New Guinea
- C. n. novaehollandiae (Gmelin, JF, 1789) – Tasmania and Bass Strait Islands (southeast Australia)

The Yindjibarndi people of the central and western Pilbara know the species as julgira; they would clip their wings and keep them as pets.

== Description ==
Adult birds have a prominent black face and throat, grey plumage, white underparts and a somewhat hooked bill. The size varies between 32 cm and 34 cm. They are slow-moving, inconspicuous birds, with a shrill, screaming call, sounding like creearck.

== Behaviour ==
=== Food and feeding ===
The diet consists of insects, their larvae, caterpillars or other invertebrates. These may be caught in flight, or caught when searching through the foliage. In addition, some fruits and seeds are also eaten.

=== Breeding ===
Breeding season is chiefly from August to February each year. Both partners build the rather small nest. The fledglings leave the nest after about three weeks of hatching. They look like the adults, except the black facial mask is reduced to an eye stripe.

Outside the breeding season, they like to flock in groups of up to a hundred birds. Some may be partially migratory or they may remain in the same territory. Lack of significant differences between regional populations in Australia makes it difficult to determine where populations move in winter.

== Gallery ==
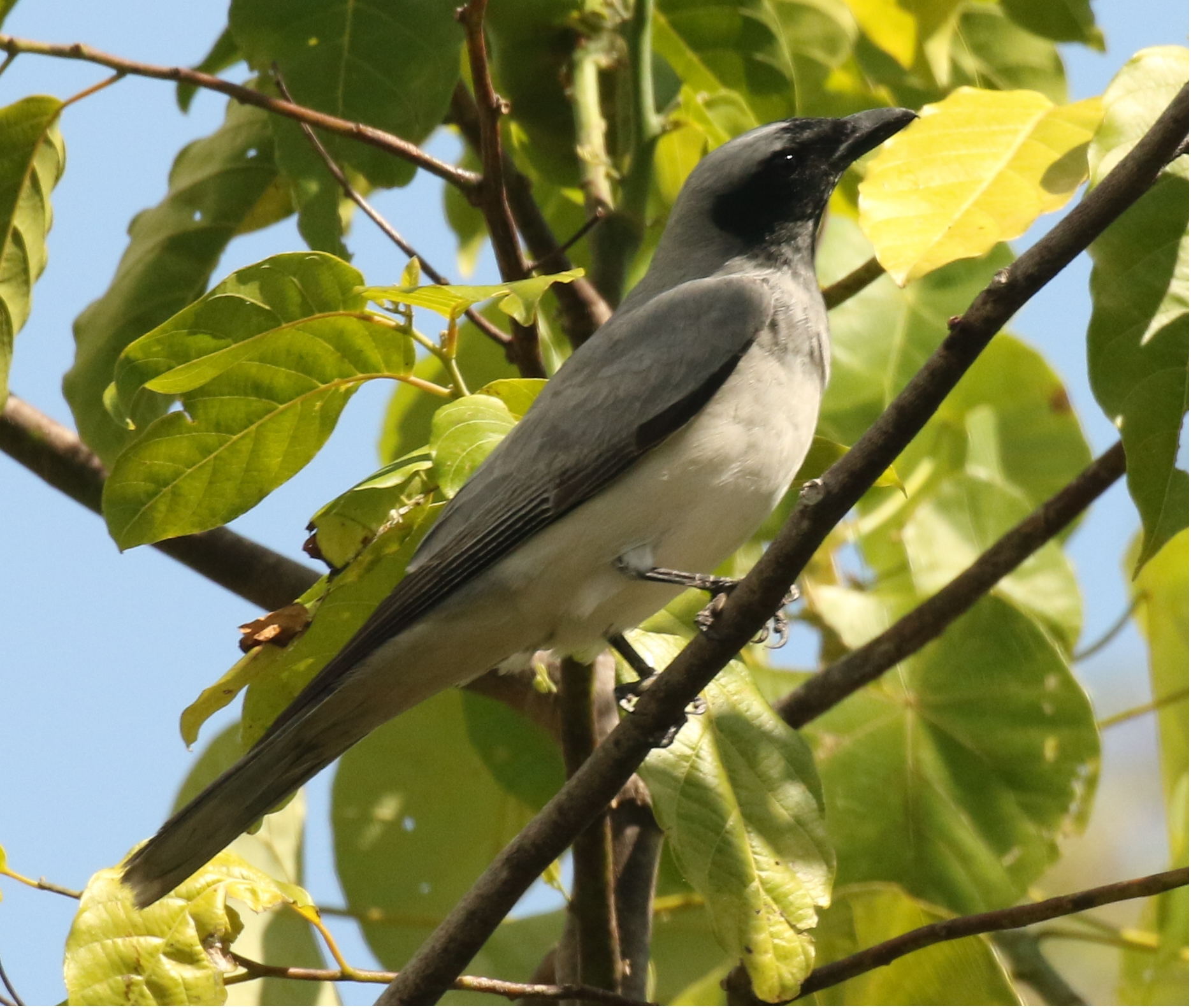
Cattana Wetlands - Cairns, Australia

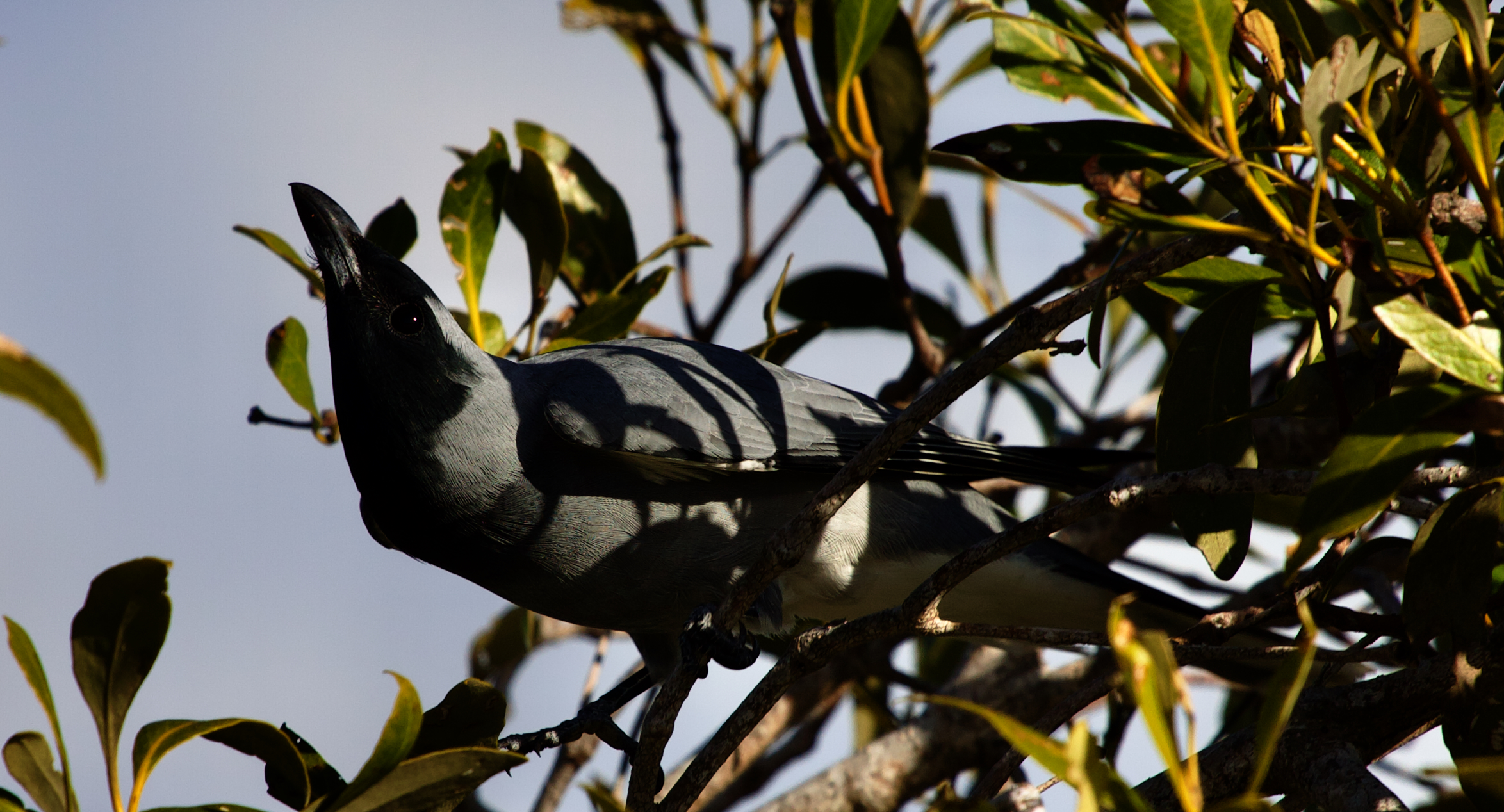
Searching through foliage in a tree for food

Rush Creek, SE Queensland, Australia
