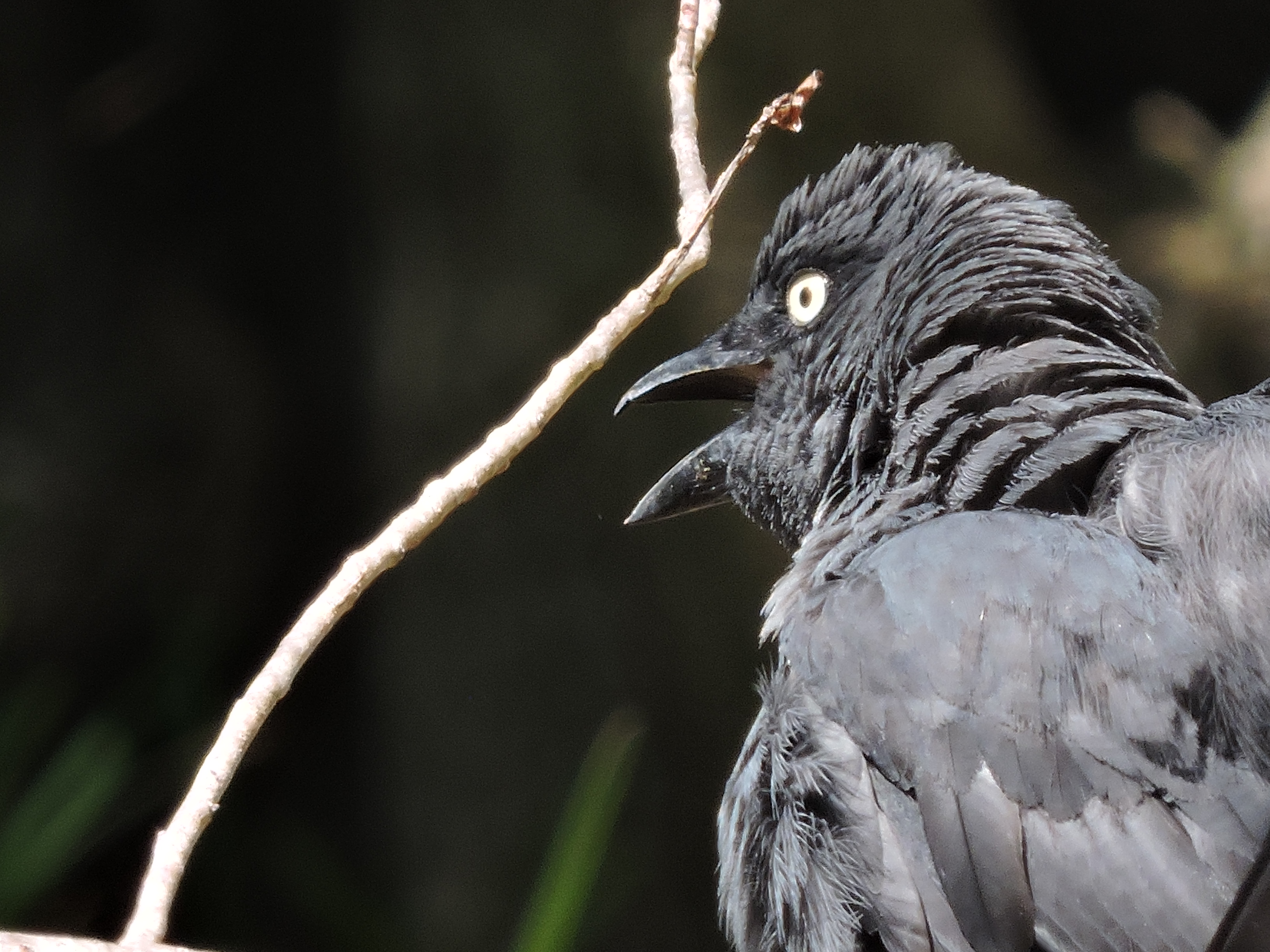

Conservation status
- Least Concern (IUCN 3.1)

Scientific classification
- Kingdom: Animalia
- Phylum: Chordata
- Class: Aves
- Order: Passeriformes
- Family: Campephagidae
- Genus: Coracina
- Species: C. caledonica

Binomial name
- Coracina caledonica (Gmelin, JF, 1788)

= South Melanesian cuckooshrike =

Species of bird

The south Melanesian cuckooshrike (Coracina caledonica) is an uncommon species of bird in the cuckooshrike family. It is found in New Caledonia, Bougainville Island, the Solomon Islands, and Vanuatu. The species is a large (32–37 cm) cuckoo-shrike with a long square tail and all over dark grey plumage. The eye of adults is yellow, whereas that of the juvenile is dark. Its natural habitats are subtropical or tropical moist lowland forests and subtropical or tropical moist montane forests.

== Taxonomy ==
The south Melanesian cuckooshrike was formally described in 1788 by the German naturalist Johann Friedrich Gmelin in his revised and expanded edition of Carl Linnaeus's Systema Naturae. He placed it with the crows in the genus Corvus and coined the binomial name Corvus caledonicus. Gmelin based his description on the "New Caledonian crow" that had been described in 1781 by the English ornithologist John Latham in his book A General Synopsis of Birds. The naturalist Joseph Banks had provided Latham with a water-colour drawing of the cuckooshrike by Georg Forster who had accompanied James Cook on his second voyage to the Pacific Ocean. The specimen had been collected in September 1774 in New Caledonia. This picture is the holotype for the species and is held by the Natural History Museum in London. The south Melanesian cuckooshrike is now one of 22 species placed in the genus Coracina that was introduced in 1816 by French ornithologist Louis Pierre Vieillot.

Four subspecies are recognised.

- C. c. thilenii (Neumann, 1915) – Espiritu Santo, Malo and Malekula (central west Vanuatu)
- C. c. seiuncta Mayr & Ripley, 1941 – Erromango (south Vanuatu)
- C. c. lifuensis (Tristram, 1879) – Lifou Island (central Loyalty Islands, New Caledonia)
- C. c. caledonica (Gmelin, JF, 1788) – Grande Terre and Île des Pins (New Caledonia)
