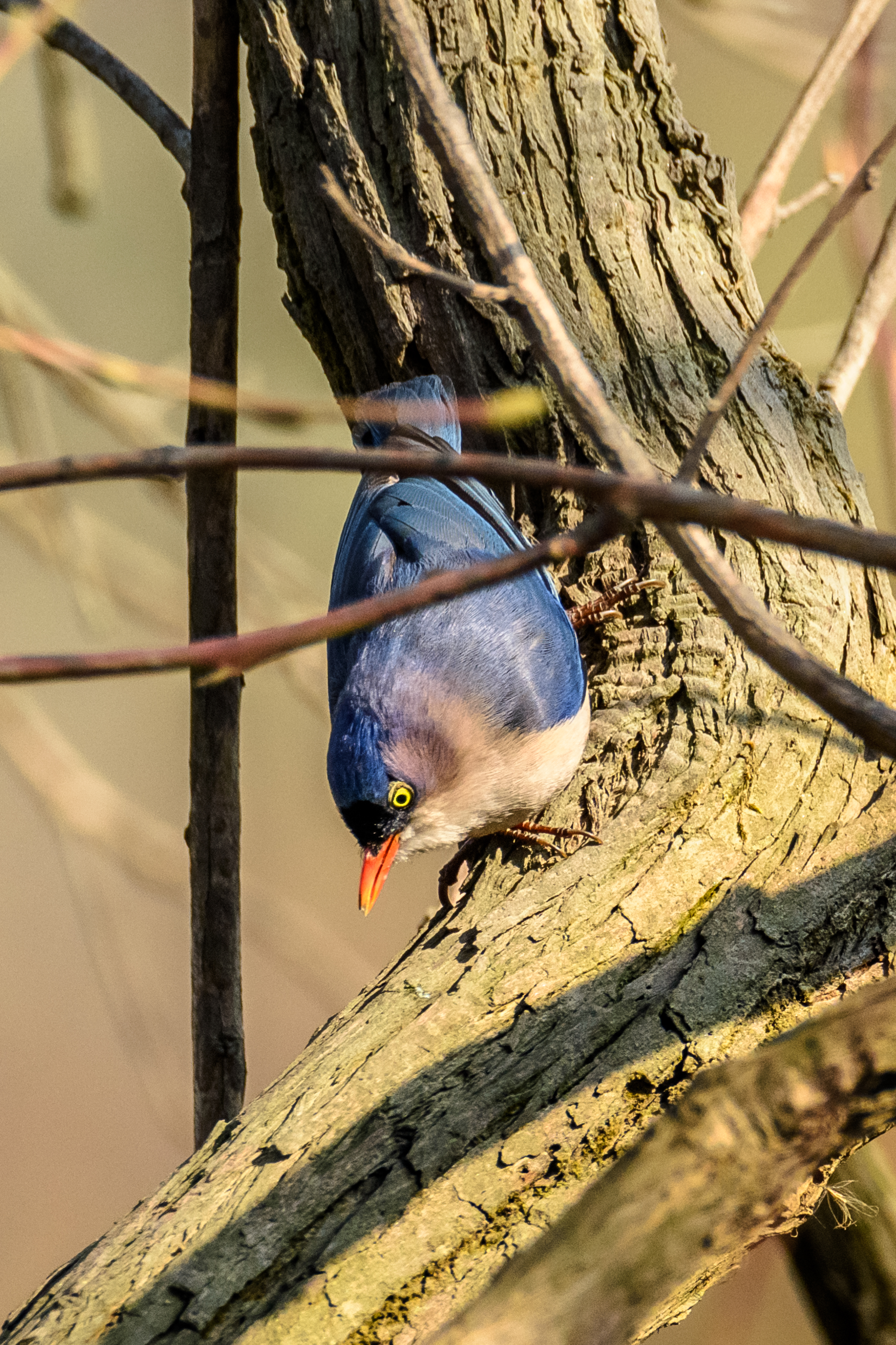
- Sitta frontalis frontalis in Bhaktapur, Nepal

Conservation status
- Least Concern (IUCN 3.1)

Scientific classification
- Kingdom: Animalia
- Phylum: Chordata
- Class: Aves
- Order: Passeriformes
- Family: Sittidae
- Genus: Sitta
- Species: S. frontalis

Binomial name
- Sitta frontalis Swainson, 1820

Audio
- Calls

= Velvet-fronted nuthatch =

Species of bird

The velvet-fronted nuthatch (Sitta frontalis) is a small passerine bird in the nuthatch family Sittidae found in southern Asia, from Nepal, India, Sri Lanka ‍and Bangladesh east to southwestern China and Indonesia. Like other nuthatches, it feeds on insects in the bark of trees, foraging on the trunks and branches and their strongly clawed toes allow them to climb down tree trunks or move on the undersides of horizontal branches. They are found in forests with good tree cover and are often found along with other species in mixed-species foraging flocks. Adult males can be told apart by the black stripe that runs behind and above the eyes. They have a rapid chipping call note. They breed in tree cavities and holes, often created by woodpeckers or barbets.

== Description ==
The velvet-fronted nuthatch has the typical nuthatch shape, short tail and powerful bill and feet. It is a small nuthatch, 12–13.5 cm long. It is violet-blue above, with lavender cheeks, buffy grey underparts, yellow eyes, and a whitish throat. The iris is distinctly pale and yellow. The bill is orange-red to bright red, and there is a black patch on the forehead and lores which is well developed in adults and less so in younger birds. The legs vary in colour between different subspecies (see #Subspecies, below). Young birds have a dark beak and dark tips to the undertail coverts. Adult males can be told apart by the black superciliary stripe that runs above the eye and over the head, towards the nape.

Females lack the supercilium and have a warmer underpart colour. Juveniles are duller versions of the adult, lacking the black frontal band. The subspecies differ in shade and size and the distribution of white on the throat.

== Taxonomy and systematics ==
Velvet-fronted nuthatches are very closely related to yellow-billed nuthatch S. solangiae and sulphur-billed nuthatch S. oenochlamys, with these three then next most closely related to blue nuthatch S. azurea. Some authors have placed this clade of four nuthatches in a separate genus Oenositta (proposed by H. E. Wolters in 1979), but this would be inappropriate as the clade, although distinct in morphology, is nested within other Sitta species. The complex includes numerous forms which have had a confusing history, for instance S. oenochlamys has been treated as a subspecies of S. frontalis in the past. The species was first described validly by Swainson who also created the genus Dendrophila in which he initially placed the species; this was invalid as Hodgson had already used the name Dendrophila for a genus of partridges. Swainson used the species name given by Horsfield who had named the bird as Orthorynchus frontalis but Horsfield published only in 1821 giving priority to Swainson as the author.

=== Subspecies ===
Five subspecies are currently accepted, though it has been argued that some could be treated as phylogenetic species:

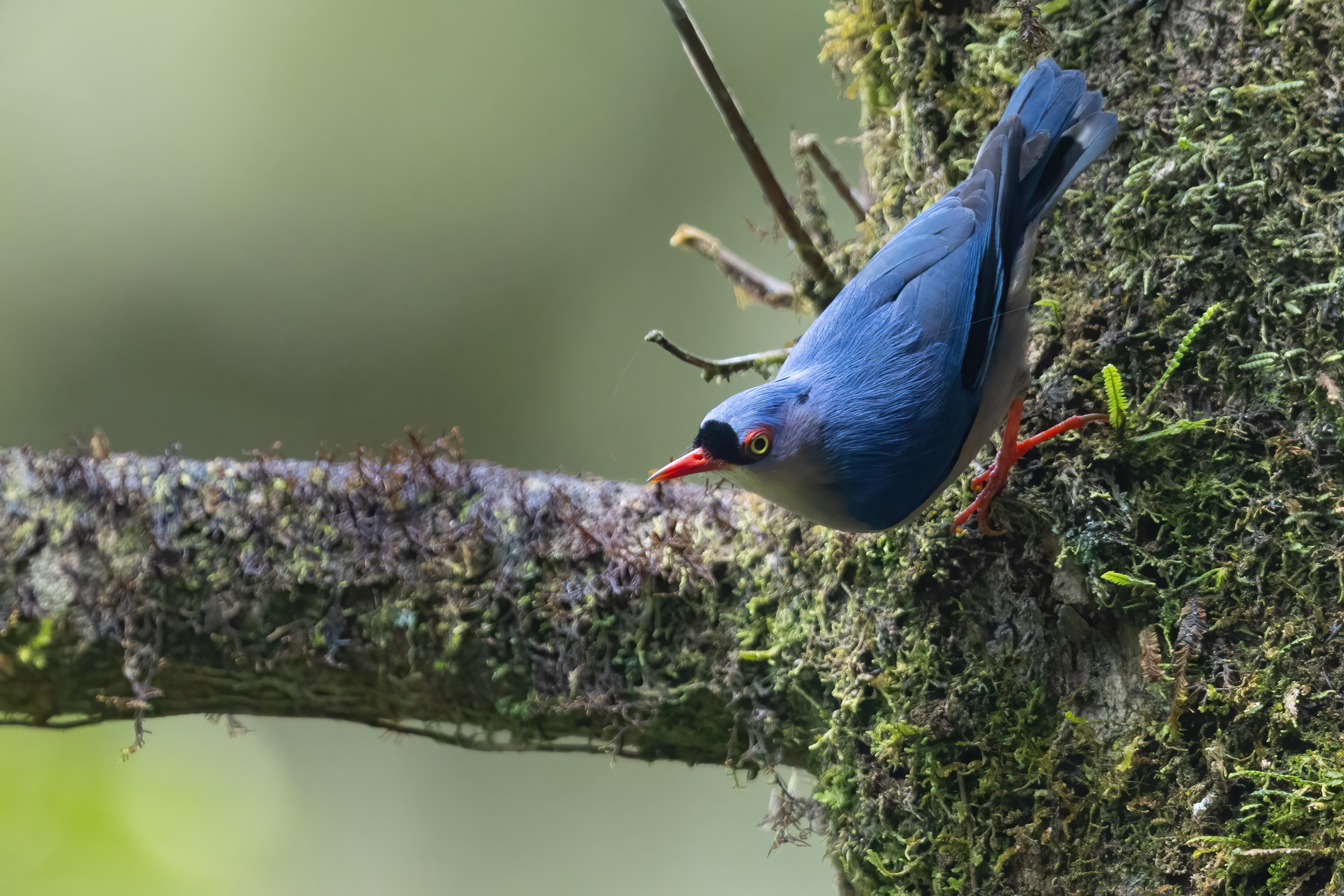
S. f. corallipes on Mount Kinabalu, Borneo

- S. f. frontalis Swainson, 1820 – the nominate form, in the hill forests of southern India in the Western Ghats, the Eastern Ghats, the central Indian forests and in Sri Lanka, the Himalaya, and east through Indochina and the far south of China. Legs yellowish. The population along the Himalaya is included, although the name S. f. corallina Hodgson, 1836 has been proposed for this population with individuals being slightly smaller (contrary to Bergmann's rule). The name S. f. simplex proposed by Koelz in 1939 for birds from the south of Bombay is also considered as a synonym. The Himalayan population extends from Uttarakhand east to Bangladesh and into Thailand, Myanmar, the Isthmus of Kra and possibly into Hong Kong where it may be an introduced species. The name S. f. chienfengensis was proposed by Tso-Hsin Cheng, 1964 for the birds of Hainan, China.
- S. f. saturatior E. J. O. Hartert, 1902 – Malay Peninsula south of the Isthmus of Kra, Penang, Singapore, the Lingga Archipelago, and northern Sumatra. Legs brownish.
- S. f. corallipes (Sharpe, 1888) – Borneo and adjacent Maratua Island. Legs bright orange-red.
- S. f. palawana E. J. O. Hartert, 1905 – Palawan and Balabac in the western Philippines. Legs light brownish.
- S. f. velata Temminck, 1821 – Java and southern Sumatra. Legs yellowish as in S. f. frontalis, but throat more extensively white.

The use of ectoparasites such as Brueelia as a proxy to unravel the phylogeny of the species is unreliable as the nuthatch shares the same Brueelia species with flycatchers (Rhipidura and Ficedula), possibly because these parasites are phoretic, travelling across hosts via blowflies.

== Habitat and ecology ==
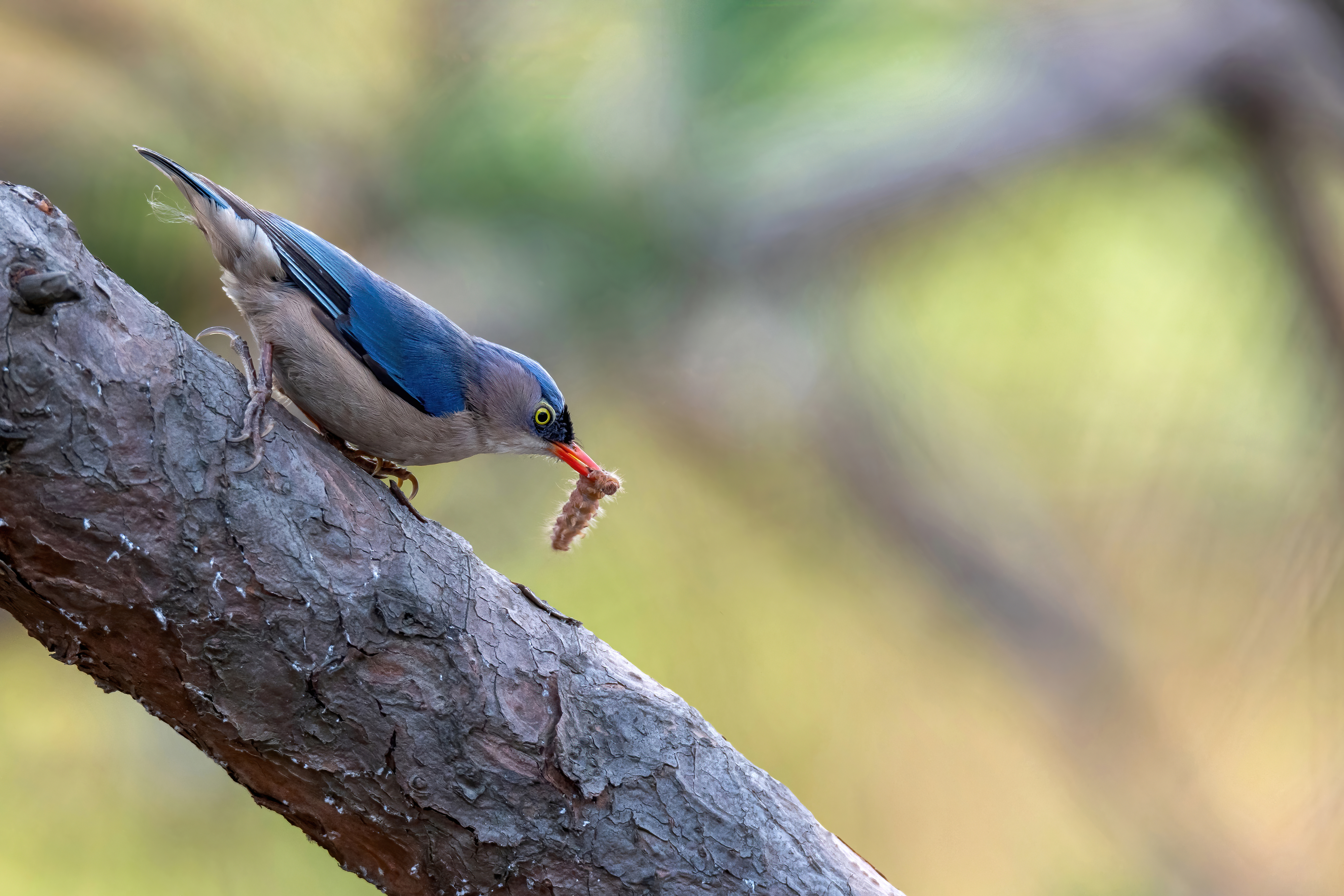
S. f. frontalis in Madhyapur Thimi, Nepal

The velvet-fronted nuthatch is a resident breeder of all types of forests from deciduous to evergreen forest. In the Sunderbans, they are found in Sonneratia mangrove forests. They also live within secondary forest and make use of the shade trees in south Indian coffee plantations.

Like other nuthatches they have strongly curved claws that allow them to climb down vertical tree trunks, unlike species such as woodpeckers that only work their way upwards. It moves jerkily up and down or around tree branches and trunks. It is an active feeder on insects and spiders, gleaned on the bark of the trunk and branches, and may be found in mixed feeding flocks with other passerines. The insects they disturb are sometimes taken by the racket-tailed drongo in Sri Lanka.

This is a noisy bird, often located by its repeated "sit-sit-sit" call.

Adults go through a complete postbreeding moult that begins at the end of June in northern India.

Plasmodium parasites including Haemoproteus have been detected in their blood. Feather mites of the genus Neodectes are found on the species.

== Breeding ==
The nests are in tree holes or crevices, lined with moss, fur and feathers, or grass. The breeding season on northern India is in summer, April to June, and January to May in southern India and Sri Lanka. Unlike other nuthatches, it is said not to use mud to narrow the entrance of the hole. Three to six eggs are laid, white speckled with red. The female spends more time incubating but both take turns in feeding the young.

== In culture ==
Being a small forest bird, only a few forest-dwelling tribes are aware of the species. The Lotha Naga people will hunt many birds for food but the velvet-fronted nuthatch is generally proscribed due to the belief that killing them would bring misfortune to the hunter. The birds forage in flocks and members are believed to stay on nearby if one is killed, and according to the Lothas, they will wait to be killed and the hunter would soon see people around him die in quick succession one after another. The Soliga people call it the maratotta or "tree hopper".
