= Mount Tambora =

Active stratovolcano on Sumbawa, Indonesia

- Tomboro
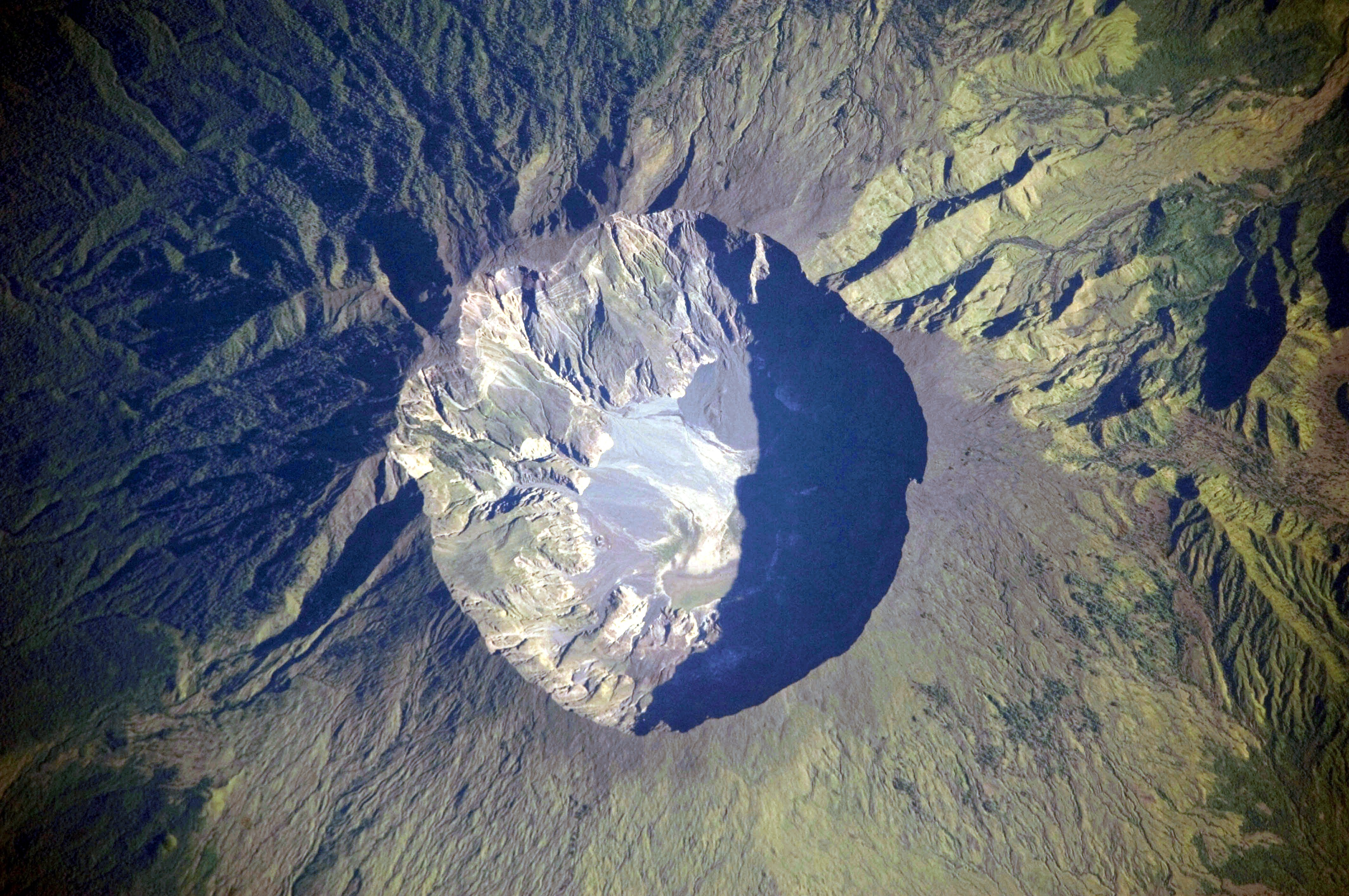
- Caldera of Mount Tambora as seen from Earth orbit

Highest point
- Elevation: 2,722 m (8,930 ft)
- Prominence: 2,722 m (8,930 ft)
- Listing: Ultras; Ribu
- Coordinates: 8°15′S 118°0′E

Geography
- Location within Indonesia
- Location: Bima and Dompu Regencies, Sanggar peninsula, Sumbawa, Lesser Sunda Islands, Indonesia

Geology
- Rock age: Late Pleistocene-recent
- Mountain type: Trachybasaltic-trachyandesitic stratovolcano
- Volcanic arc: Sunda Arc
- Last eruption: 1967

Climbing
- Easiest route: Southeast: Doro Mboha; Northwest: Pancasila

Mount Tambora, or Tomboro, is an active stratovolcano in West Nusa Tenggara, Indonesia. Located on Sumbawa in the Lesser Sunda Islands, volcanism is the result of subduction zones. The 1815 eruption was the largest in recorded history, erupting up to 150 cubic kilometers of volcanic material, making it a VEI-7 on the Volcanic Explosivity Index. This caused the summer of 1816 to become known as the "Year Without a Summer" due to global cooling from the eruption.

== Geographical setting ==
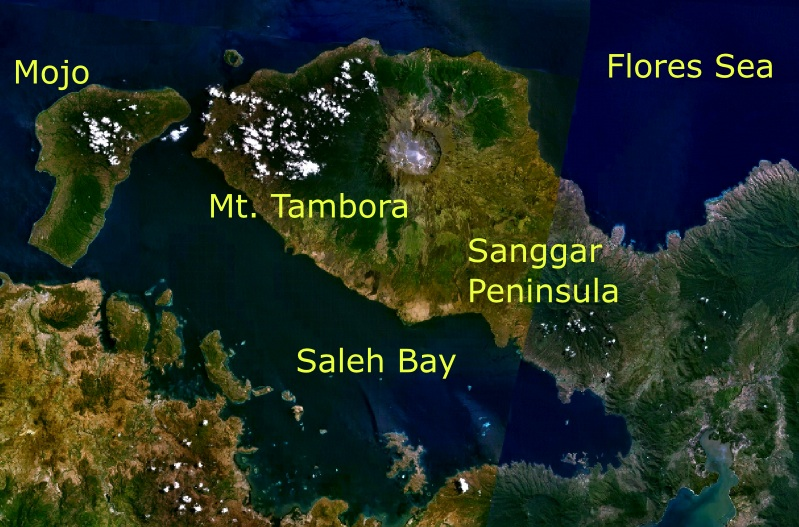
Mount Tambora and its surroundings as seen from space

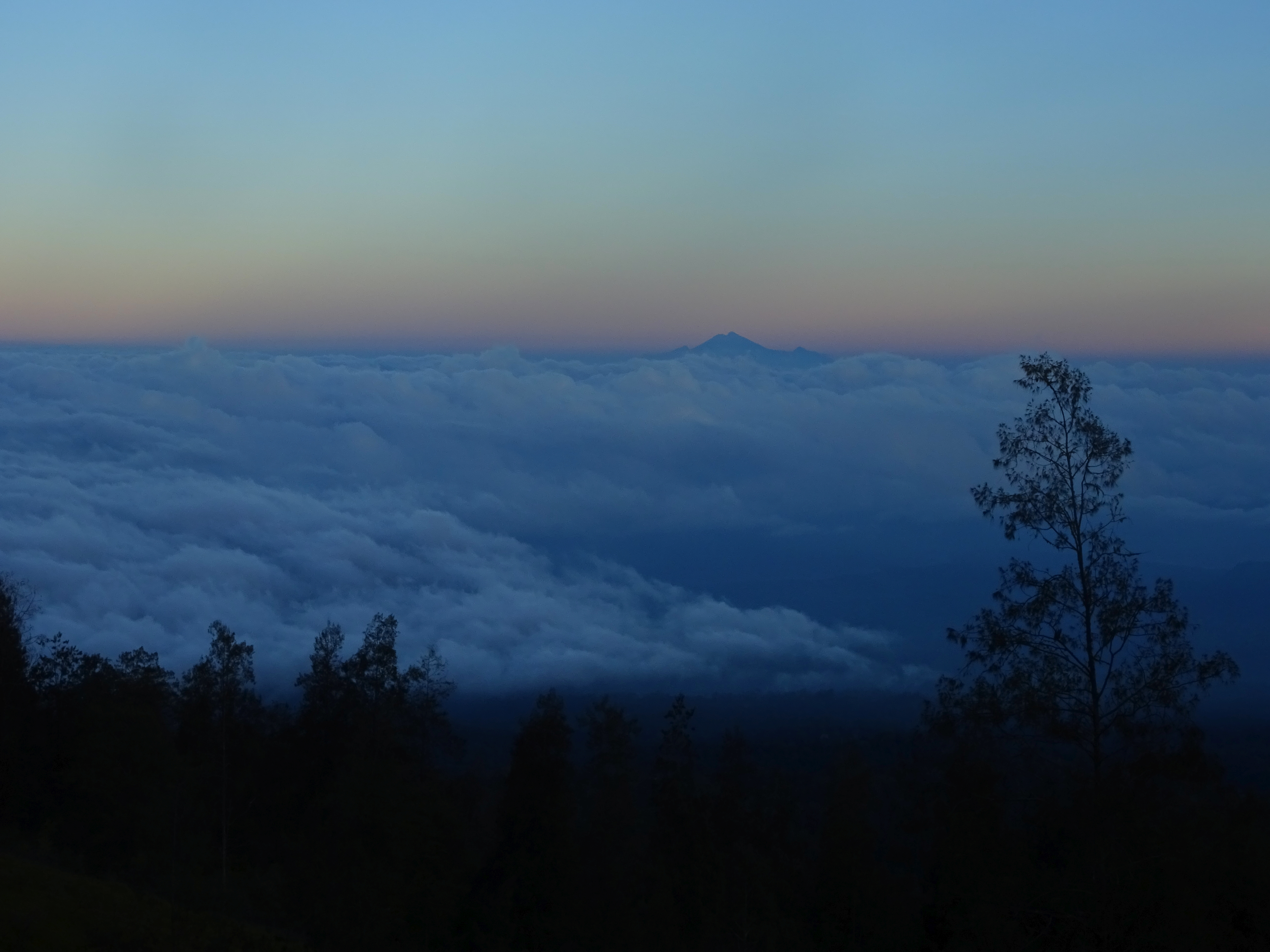
View of Mount Rinjani from Mount Tambora. Viewing distance is 165 kilometres (103 mi).

Mount Tambora is situated in the northern part of Sumbawa island, part of the Lesser Sunda Islands. It is a segment of the Sunda Arc, a chain of volcanic islands that make up the southern chain of the Indonesian archipelago. Tambora forms its own peninsula on Sumbawa, known as the Sanggar peninsula. To the north of the peninsula is the Flores Sea and to the south is the 86 kilometres (53 mi) long and 36 kilometres (22 mi) wide Saleh Bay. At the mouth of Saleh Bay there is an islet called Mojo.

Besides the seismologists and vulcanologists who monitor the mountain's activity, Mount Tambora is an area of interest to archaeologists and biologists. The mountain also attracts tourists for hiking and wildlife activities, though in small numbers. The two nearest cities are Dompu and Bima. There are three concentrations of villages around the mountain slope. At the east is Sanggar village, to the northwest are Doro Peti and Pesanggrahan villages, and to the west is Calabai village.

There are two routes of ascent to the caldera. The first begins at Doro Mboha village on the southeast of the mountain and follows a paved road through a cashew plantation to an elevation of 1,150 metres (3,770 ft). The road terminates at the southern part of the caldera, which at 1,950 metres (6,400 ft) is reachable only by hiking. This location is only one hour from the caldera, and usually serves as a base camp from which volcanic activity can be monitored. The second route starts from Pancasila village at the northwest of the mountain and is only accessible on foot. The 16-kilometre (10 mi) hike from Pancasila at 740 metres (2,430 ft) elevation to the caldera of the volcano takes approximately 14 hours with several stops (pos) en route to the top. The trail leads through dense jungle with wildlife such as Elaeocarpus, Asian water monitor, reticulated python, hawks, orange-footed scrubfowl, pale-shouldered cicadabird (Coracina dohertyi), brown and scaly-crowned honeyeater, yellow-crested cockatoo, yellow-ringed white-eye, helmeted friarbird, wild boar, Javan rusa and crab-eating macaques.

== History ==
=== Geological history ===
==== Formation ====
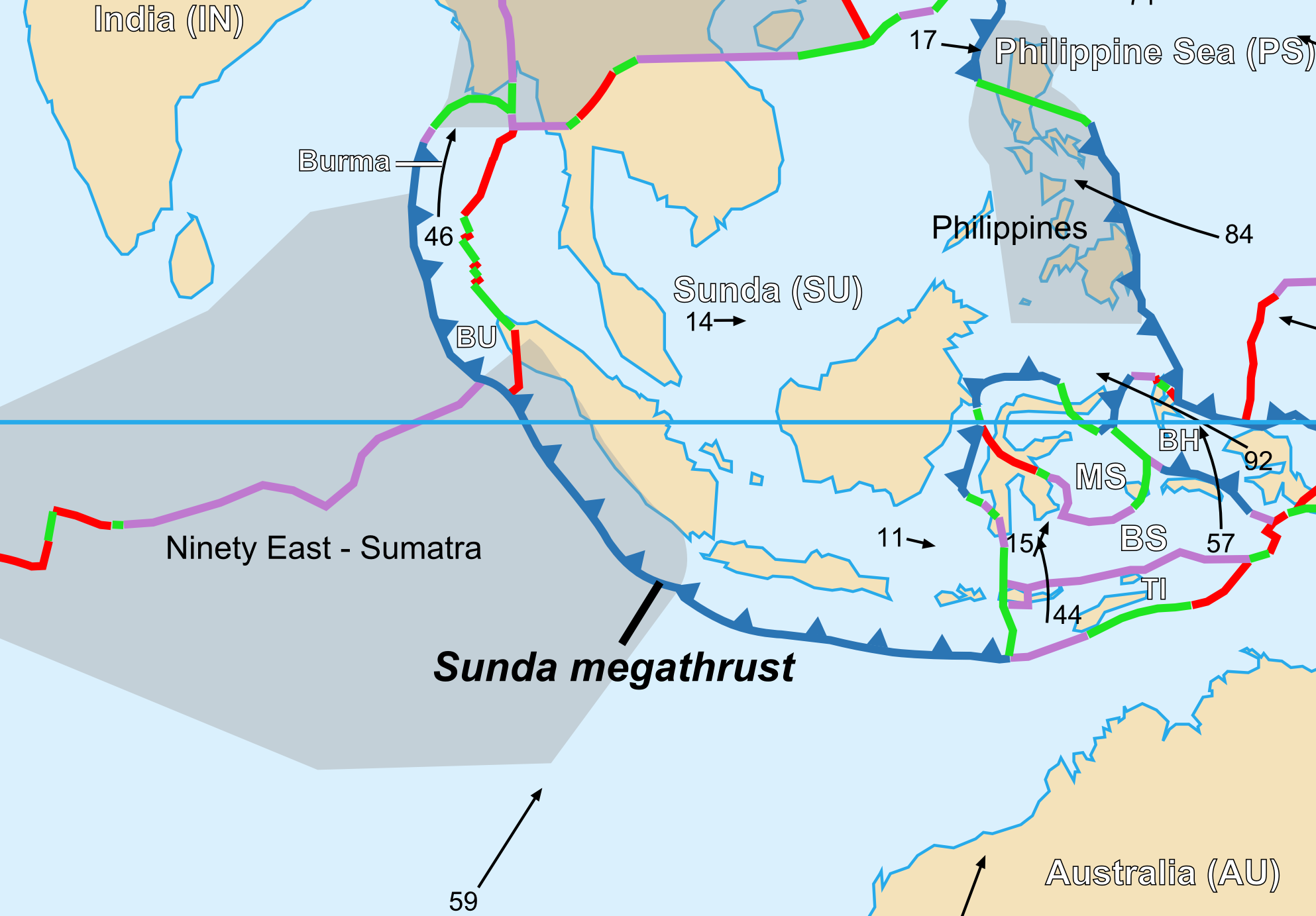
Plate boundaries of Indonesia, with the location of Mount Tambora to the lower right of "11"

Tambora lies 340 kilometres (210 mi) north of the Java Trench system and 180 to 190 kilometres (110 to 120 mi) above the upper surface of the active north-dipping subduction zone. Sumbawa Island is flanked to the north and south by oceanic crust. The convergence rate of the Australian Plate beneath the Sunda Plate is 7.8 centimetres (3.1 in) per year. Estimates for the onset of the volcanism at Mount Tambora range from 57 to 43 ka. The latter estimate published in 2012 is based on argon dating of the first pre-caldera lava flows. The formation of Tambora drained a large magma chamber pre-existing under the mountain. The Mojo islet was formed as part of this process in which Saleh Bay first appeared as a sea basin about 25,000 years ago.

A high volcanic cone with a single central vent formed before the 1815 eruption, which follows a stratovolcano shape. The diameter at the base is 60 kilometres (37 mi). The volcano frequently erupted lava, which descended over steep slopes. Tambora has produced trachybasalt and trachyandesite rocks which are rich in potassium. The volcanics contain phenocrysts of apatite, biotite, clinopyroxene, leucite, magnetite, olivine and plagioclase, with the exact composition of the phenocrysts varying between different rock types. Orthopyroxene is absent in the trachyandesites of Tambora. Olivine is most present in the rocks with less than 53 percent SiO_{2}, while it is absent in the more silica-rich volcanics, characterised by the presence of biotite phenocrysts. The mafic series also contain titanium magnetite and the trachybasalts are dominated by anorthosite-rich plagioclase. Rubidium, strontium and phosphorus pentoxide are especially rich in the lavas from Tambora, more than the comparable ones from Mount Rinjani. The lavas of Tambora are slightly enriched in zircon compared with those of Rinjani.

The magma involved in the 1815 eruption originated in the mantle and was further modified by melts derived from subducted sediments, fluids derived from the subducted crust and crystallization processes in magma chambers. ^{87}Sr^{86}Sr ratios of Mount Tambora are similar to those of Mount Rinjani, but lower than those measured at Sangeang Api. Potassium levels of Tambora volcanics exceed 3 weight percent, placing them in the shoshonite range for alkaline series.

Since the 1815 eruption, the lowermost portion contains deposits of interlayered sequences of lava and pyroclastic materials. Approximately 40% of the layers are represented in the 1-to-4 m-thick (3.3-to-13.1 ft) lava flows. Thick scoria beds were produced by the fragmentation of lava flows. Within the upper section, the lava is interbedded with scoria, tuffs, pyroclastic flows and pyroclastic falls. Tambora has at least 20 parasitic cones and lava domes, including Doro Afi Toi, Kadiendi Nae, Molo and Tahe. The main product of these parasitic vents is basaltic lava flows.

==== Eruptive history ====
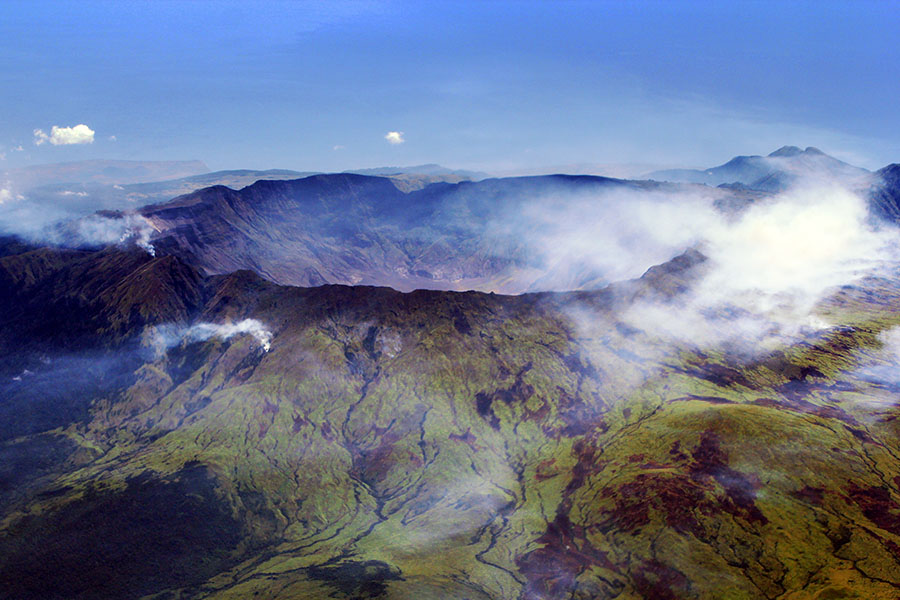
Aerial view of the caldera of Mount Tambora, 2011

Radiocarbon dating has established that Mount Tambora had erupted three times during the current Holocene epoch before the 1815 eruption, but the magnitudes of these eruptions are unknown. Their estimated dates are 3910 BC ± 200 years, 3050 BC and 740 AD ± 150 years. An earlier caldera was filled with lava flows starting from 43,000 BC; two pyroclastic eruptions occurred later and formed the Black Sands and Brown Tuff formations, the last of which was emplaced between about 3895 BC and 800 AD.

In 1812, Mount Tambora became highly active, with its maximum eruptive intensity occurring in April 1815. The magnitude was 7 on the Volcanic Explosivity Index (VEI) scale, with a total tephra ejecta volume of up to 1.8 × 10^{11} cubic metres, or 180 cubic kilometres. Its eruptive characteristics included central vent and explosive eruptions, pyroclastic flows, tsunamis and caldera collapse. This eruption had an effect on global climate. Volcanic activity ceased on 15 July 1815. Activity resumed in August 1819—a small eruption with "flames" and rumbling aftershocks, and was considered to be part of the 1815 eruption. This eruption was recorded at 2 on the VEI scale.

Around 1880 ± 30 years, eruptions at Mount Tambora have been registered only inside the caldera. It created small lava flows and lava dome extrusions; this was recorded at two on the VEI scale. This eruption created the Doro Api Toi parasitic cone inside the caldera.

Mount Tambora is still active and minor lava domes and flows were extruded on the caldera floor during the 19th and 20th centuries. The last eruption was recorded in 1967. It was a gentle eruption with a VEI of 0, which means it was non-explosive. Another very small eruption was reported in 2011. In August 2011, the alert level for the volcano was raised from level I to level II after increased activity was reported in the caldera, including earthquakes and steam emissions.

=== 1815 eruption ===
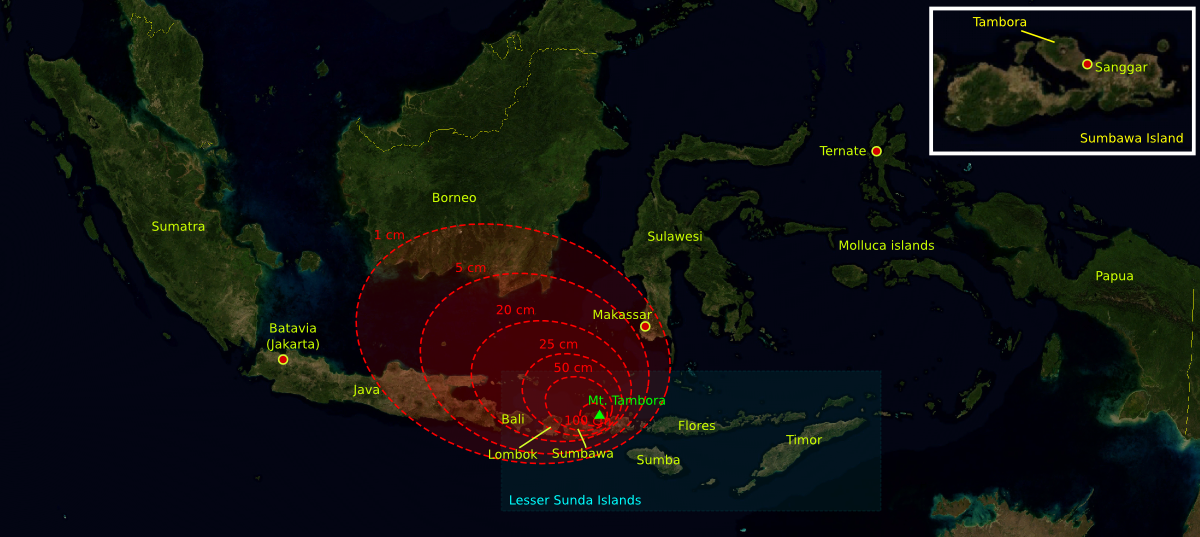
Estimated depth of volcanic ashfall during the 1815 eruption—the outermost region (1 cm) reached Borneo and the Sulawesi islands

Tambora underwent a series of violent eruptions, beginning on 5 April 1815, and culminating in the largest eruption in recorded human history. The magma chamber under Tambora had been drained by previous eruptions and lay dormant for several centuries as it refilled. Volcanic activity reached a peak that year, culminating in an explosive eruption that was heard on Sumatra island, more than 2,600 kilometres (1,600 mi) away and possibly over 3,350 kilometres (2,080 mi) away in Thailand and Laos. Heavy volcanic ash rains were observed as far away as Borneo, Sulawesi, Java, and Maluku Islands, and the maximum elevation of Tambora was reduced from about 4,300 to 2,850 metres (14,110 to 9,350 feet). Estimates vary, but the death toll was at least 71,000 people. The eruption contributed to global climate anomalies in the following years, while 1816 became known as the "Year Without a Summer" because of the effect on North American and European weather. In the Northern Hemisphere, crops failed and livestock died, resulting in the worst famine of the century.

==== Chronology of the eruption ====
Before 1815, Mount Tambora had been dormant for several centuries, as hydrous magma cooled gradually in a closed magma chamber. Inside the chamber, at depths of 1.5 to 4.5 kilometres (0.9 to 2.8 mi), cooling and partial crystallization of the magma exsolved high-pressure magmatic fluid. Overpressure of the chamber of about 4,000 to 5,000 bars (58,000 to 73,000 psi) was generated as temperatures ranged from 700 to 850 °C (1,300 to 1,600 °F). In 1812, the crater began to rumble and generated a dark cloud.

A moderate-sized eruption on 5 April 1815 was followed by thunderous detonation sounds that could be heard in Ternate on the Molucca Islands, 1,400 kilometres (870 mi) from Mount Tambora. On the morning of 6 April 1815, volcanic ash began to fall in East Java, with faint detonation sounds lasting until 10 April. What was first thought to be the sound of firing guns was heard on 10 and 11 April on Sumatra island (more than 2,600 kilometres (1,600 mi) away), and possibly over 3,350 kilometres (2,080 mi) away in Thailand and Laos.

The eruptions intensified at about 7:00 p.m. on the 10th. Three plumes rose and merged. Pieces of pumice of up to 20 centimetres (7.9 in) in diameter rained down at approximately 8 p.m., followed by ash at around 9–10 p.m. The eruption column collapsed, producing hot pyroclastic flows that cascaded down the mountain and towards the sea on all sides of the peninsula, wiping out the village of Tambora. Loud explosions were heard until the next evening, 11 April. The veil of ash spread as far as West Java and South Sulawesi, while a "nitrous odor" was noticeable in Batavia. The heavy tephra-tinged rain did not recede until 17 April. Analysis of various sites on Mount Tambora using ground-penetrating radar has revealed alternations of pumice and ash deposits covered by the pyroclastic surge and flow sediments that vary in thickness regionally.

The eruption is estimated to have had a Volcanic Explosivity Index of 7. It had 4–10 times the energy of the 1883 Krakatoa eruption. An estimated 100 cubic kilometres (24 cu mi) of pyroclastic trachyandesite was ejected, weighing approximately 1.4×10^{14} kg. This has left a caldera measuring 6 to 7 kilometres (3.7 to 4.3 mi) across and 600 to 700 metres (2,000 to 2,300 ft) deep. The density of fallen ash in Makassar was 636 kg/m^{3}. Before the explosion, Mount Tambora was approximately 4,300 metres (14,100 ft) high, one of the tallest peaks in the Indonesian archipelago. After the eruption of 1815, the maximum elevation was reduced to 2,851 metres (9,354 ft).

The 1815 Tambora eruption is the largest and most devastating observed eruption in recorded history; a comparison with other major eruptions is listed below. The explosion was heard 2,600 kilometres (1,600 mi) or 3,350 kilometres (2,080 mi) away, and ash deposits were registered at a distance of at least 1,300 kilometres (810 mi). A pitch of darkness was observed as far away as 600 kilometres (370 mi) from the mountain summit for up to two days. Pyroclastic flows spread to distances of about 20 kilometres (12 mi) from the summit and an estimated 9.3–11.8 × 10^{13} g of stratospheric sulfate aerosols were generated by the eruption.

==== Aftermath ====
The island's entire vegetation was destroyed as uprooted trees, mixed with pumice ash, washed into the sea and formed rafts of up to 5 kilometres (3.1 mi) across. One pumice raft was found in the Indian Ocean, near Calcutta, on 1 and 3 October 1815. Clouds of thick ash still covered the summit on 23 April. Explosions ceased on 15 July, although smoke emissions were still observed as late as 23 August. Flames and rumbling aftershocks were reported in August 1819, four years after the event.

On my trip towards the western part of the island, I passed through nearly the whole of Dompo and a considerable part of Bima. The extreme misery to which the inhabitants have been reduced is shocking to behold. There were still on the road side the remains of several corpses, and the marks of where many others had been interred: the villages almost entirely deserted and the houses fallen down, the surviving inhabitants having dispersed in search of food.
...
Since the eruption, a violent diarrhoea has prevailed in Bima, Dompo, and Sang’ir, which has carried off a great number of people. It is supposed by the natives to have been caused by drinking water which has been impregnated with ashes; and horses have also died, in great numbers, from a similar complaint.

— Lt. Philips, ordered by Sir Stamford Raffles to go to Sumbawa

A moderate tsunami struck the shores of various islands in the Indonesian archipelago on 10 April, with waves reaching 4 metres (13 ft) in Sanggar at around 10 p.m. A tsunami causing waves of 1 to 2 metres (3.3 to 6.6 ft) was reported in Besuki, East Java before midnight and another exceeded 2 metres (6.6 ft) in the Molucca Islands. The eruption column reached the stratosphere at an altitude of more than 43 kilometres (141,000 ft). Coarser ash particles fell one to two weeks after the eruptions, while finer particles stayed in the atmosphere for months to years at an altitude of 10 to 30 kilometres (33,000 to 98,000 ft). There are various estimates of the volume of ash emitted: a recent study estimates a dense-rock equivalent volume for the ash of 23 ± 3 cubic kilometres (5.52 ± 0.72 cu mi) and a dense-rock equivalent volume of 18 ± 6 cubic kilometres (4.3 ± 1.4 cu mi) for the pyroclastic flows. Longitudinal winds spread these fine particles around the globe, creating optical phenomena. Between 28 June and 2 July, and between 3 September and 7 October 1815, prolonged and brilliantly coloured sunsets and twilights were frequently seen in London. Most commonly, pink or purple colours appeared above the horizon at twilight and orange or red near the horizon.

==== Fatalities ====
The number of fatalities has been estimated by various sources since the 19th century. Swiss botanist Heinrich Zollinger travelled to Sumbawa in 1847 and recollected witness accounts about the 1815 eruption of Tambora. In 1855, he published estimates of directly killed people at 10,100, mostly from pyroclastic flows. A further 37,825 died from starvation on Sumbawa island. On Lombok, another 10,000 died from disease and hunger. Petroeschevsky (1949) estimated that about 48,000 and 44,000 people were killed on Sumbawa and Lombok, respectively. Several authors have used Petroeschevsky's figures, such as Stothers (1984), who estimated 88,000 deaths in total. Tanguy et al. (1998) considered Petroeschevsky's figures based on untraceable sources, so developed an estimate based solely on two primary sources: Zollinger, who spent several months on Sumbawa after the eruption, and the notes of Sir Stamford Raffles, Governor-General of the Dutch East Indies during the event. Tanguy pointed out that there may have been additional victims on Bali and East Java because of famine and disease, and estimated 11,000 deaths from direct volcanic action and 49,000 from post-eruption famine and epidemics. Oppenheimer (2003) estimated at least 71,000 deaths, and numbers as high as 117,000 have been proposed.

Comparison of major volcanic eruptions
Volcano	Location	Year	Column height (km)	VEI	N. hemisphere summer anomaly (°C)	Fatalities
Taupō Volcano	New Zealand	181	51	7	?	unlikely
Paektu Mountain	Democratic People's Republic of Korea	946	25	7	?	?
Mount Samalas	Indonesia	1257	38–43	7	−1.2	?
1452/1453 mystery eruption	Unknown	1452	?	7	−0.5	?
Huaynaputina	Peru	1600	46	6	−0.8	≈1,400
Mount Tambora	Indonesia	1815	44	7	−0.5	>71,000
Krakatoa	Indonesia	1883	80	6	−0.3	36,600
Santa María Volcano	Guatemala	1902	34	6	no anomaly	7,000–13,000
Novarupta	United States	1912	32	6	−0.4	2
Mount St. Helens	United States	1980	24	5	no anomaly	57
El Chichón	Mexico	1982	32	5	?	>2,000
Nevado del Ruiz	Colombia	1985	27	3	no anomaly	23,000
Mount Pinatubo	Philippines	1991	34	6	−0.5	1,202
Hunga Tonga–Hunga Haʻapai	Tonga	2022	58	5–6	?	6
Sources: Oppenheimer (2003), and Smithsonian Institution's Global Volcanism Program

===== Global effects =====
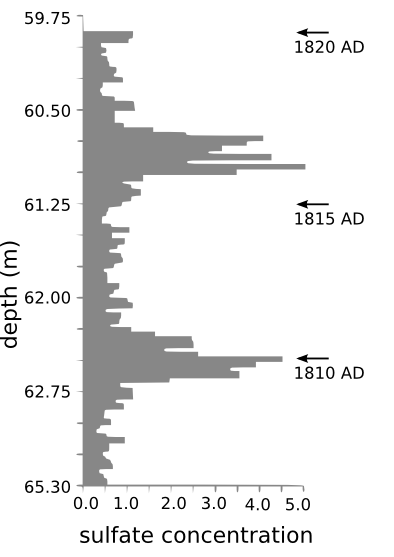
Sulfate concentration in ice core from Central Greenland, dated by counting oxygen isotope seasonal variations. There is an unknown eruption around the 1810s.

The 1815 eruption released 10 to 120 million tons of sulfur into the stratosphere, causing a global climate anomaly. Different methods have been used to estimate the ejected sulfur mass: the petrological method, an optical depth measurement based on anatomical observations, and the polar ice core sulfate concentration method, which calibrated against cores from Greenland and Antarctica.

In the spring and summer of 1816, a persistent stratospheric sulfate aerosol veil, described then as a "dry fog", was observed in the northeastern United States. It was not dispersed by wind or rainfall, and it reddened and dimmed sunlight to an extent that sunspots were visible to the naked eye. Areas of the Northern Hemisphere suffered extreme weather conditions and 1816 became known as the "Year Without a Summer". Average global temperatures decreased about 0.4 to 0.7 °C (0.7 to 1.3 °F), enough to cause significant agricultural problems around the globe. After 4 June 1816, when there were frosts in Connecticut, cold weather expanded over most of New England. On 6 June 1816, it snowed in Albany, New York and Dennysville, Maine. Similar conditions persisted for at least three months, ruining most crops across North America while Canada experienced extreme cold. Snow fell until 10 June near Quebec City, accumulating to 30 centimetres (12 in).

That year became the second-coldest year in the Northern Hemisphere since 1400, while the 1810s were the coldest decade on record, a result of Tambora's eruption and other suspected volcanic events between 1809 and 1810. (See sulfate concentration chart.) Surface-temperature anomalies during the summers of 1816, 1817 and 1818 were −0.51, −0.44 and −0.29 °C, respectively. Along with a cooler summer, parts of Europe experienced a stormier winter, and the Elbe and Ohře Rivers froze over for twelve days in February 1816. As a result, prices of wheat, rye, barley and oats rose dramatically by 1817.

This climate anomaly has been cited as a reason for the severity of the 1816–1819 typhus epidemic in southeast Europe and the eastern Mediterranean. Large numbers of livestock died in New England during the winter of 1816–1817, while cool temperatures and heavy rains led to failed harvests in the British Isles. Families in Wales travelled long distances as refugees, begging for food. Famine was prevalent in north and southwest Ireland, following the failure of wheat, oat and potato harvests. The crisis was severe in Germany, where food prices rose sharply. Demonstrations at grain markets and bakeries, followed by riots, arson and looting, took place in many European cities. It was the worst famine of the 19th century.

== Culture ==
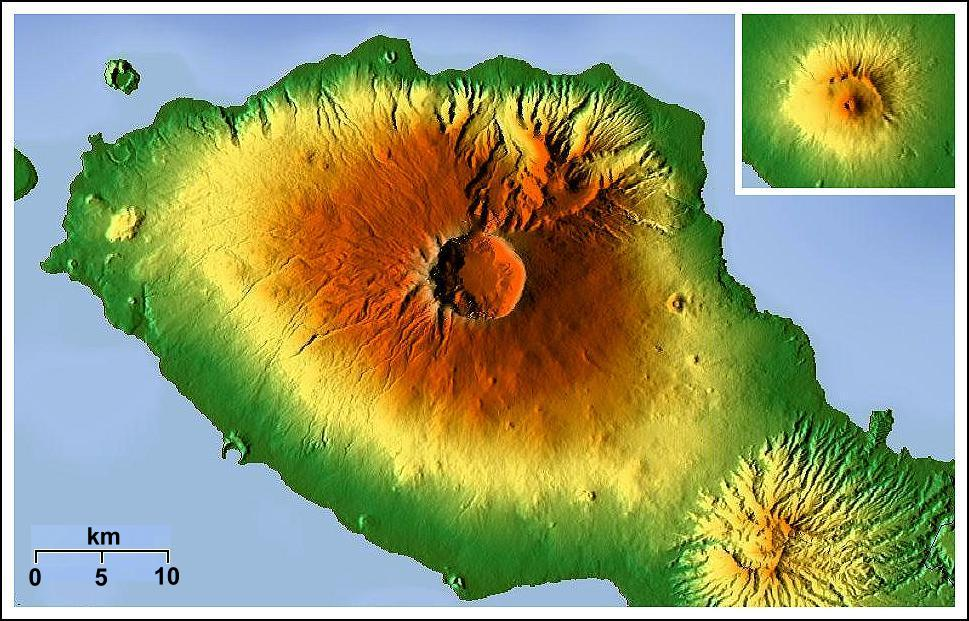
Size comparison of Mount Tambora ("Pompeii of the East") and Mount Vesuvius ("Pompeii")

A human settlement obliterated by the Tambora eruption was discovered in 2004. That summer, a team led by Haraldur Sigurðsson with scientists from the University of Rhode Island, the University of North Carolina at Wilmington and the Indonesian Directorate of Volcanology began an archaeological dig in Tambora. Over six weeks, they unearthed evidence of habitation about 25 kilometres (16 mi) west of the caldera, deep in jungle, 5 kilometres (3.1 mi) from shore. The team excavated 3 metres (9.8 ft) of deposits of pumice and ash. The scientists used ground-penetrating radar to locate a small buried house which contained the remains of two adults, bronze bowls, ceramic pots, iron tools and other artifacts. Tests revealed that objects had been carbonized by the heat of the magma. Sigurdsson dubbed the find the "Pompeii of the East", and media reports referred to the "Lost Kingdom of Tambora". Sigurdsson intended to return to Tambora in 2007 to search for the rest of the villages, and hopefully to find a palace. Many villages in the area had converted to Islam in the 17th century, but the structures uncovered so far do not show Islamic influence.

Based on the artifacts found, such as bronzeware and finely decorated china possibly of Vietnamese or Cambodian origin, the team concluded that the people were well-off traders. The Sumbawa people were known in the East Indies for their horses, honey, sappan wood (for producing red dye), and sandalwood (for incense and medications). The area was thought to be highly productive agriculturally.

The language of the Tambora people was lost with the eruption. Linguists have examined remnant lexical material, such as records by Zollinger and Raffles, and established that Tambora was not an Austronesian language, as would be expected in the area, but possibly a language isolate, or perhaps a member of one of the families of Papuan languages found 500 kilometres (310 mi) or more to the east.

The eruption is captured in latter-day folklore, which explains the cataclysm as divine retribution. A local ruler is said to have incurred the wrath of Allah by feeding dog meat to a hajji and killing him. This is expressed in a poem written around 1830:

Bunyi bahananya sangat berjabuh
Ditempuh air timpa habu
Berteriak memanggil anak dan ibu
Disangkanya dunia menjadi kelabu

Asalnya konon Allah Taala marah
Perbuatan sultan Raja Tambora
Membunuh tuan haji menumpahkan darah
Kuranglah pikir dan kira-kira

Translation:

Its noise reverberated loudly
Torrents of water mixed with ash descended
Children and mothers screamed and cried
Believing the world had turned to ash

The cause was said to be the wrath of God Almighty
At the deed of the King of Tambora
In murdering a worthy pilgrim, spilling his blood
Rashly and thoughtlessly

== Ecosystem ==
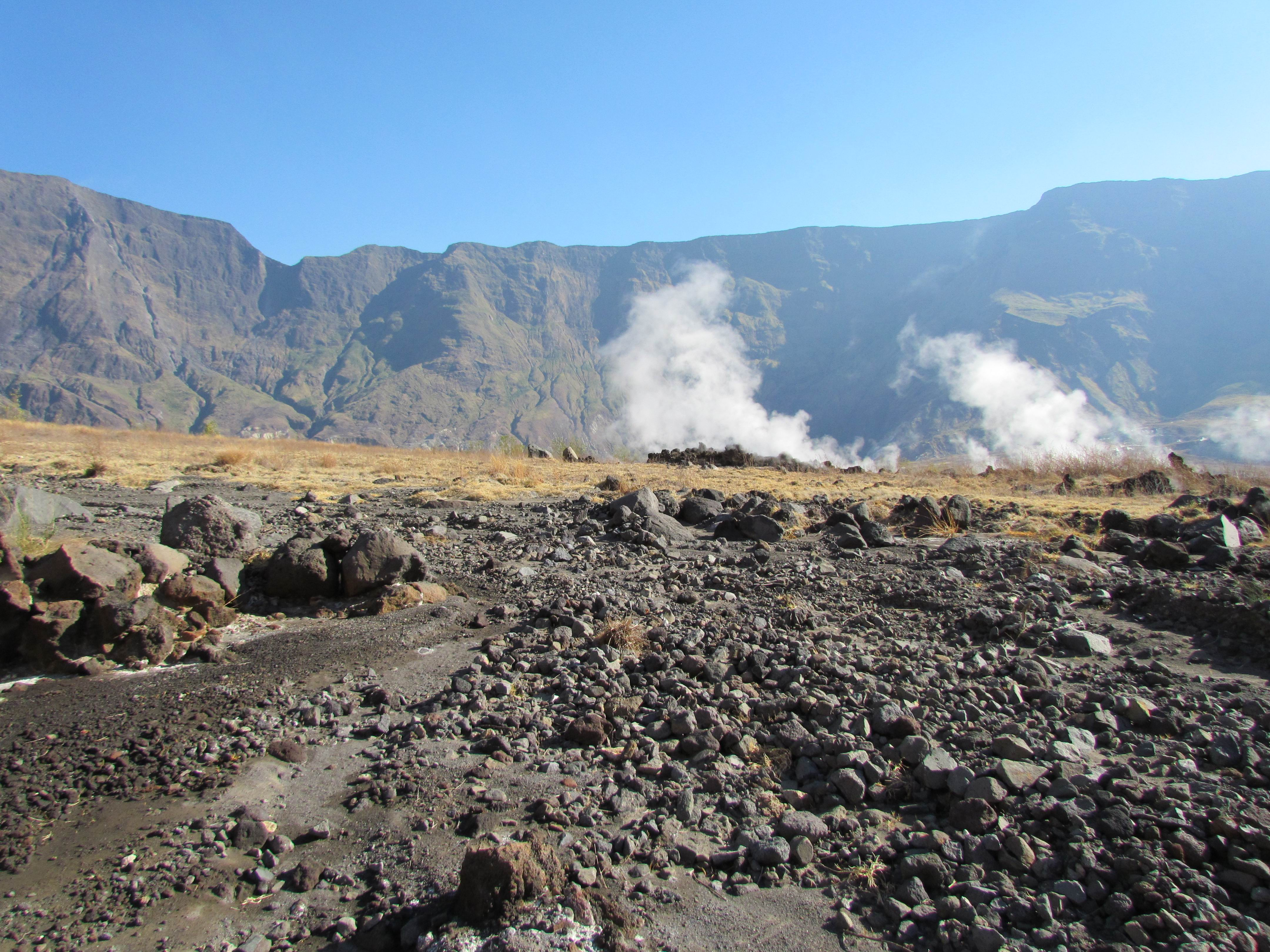
The floor of the caldera of Mount Tambora, looking north

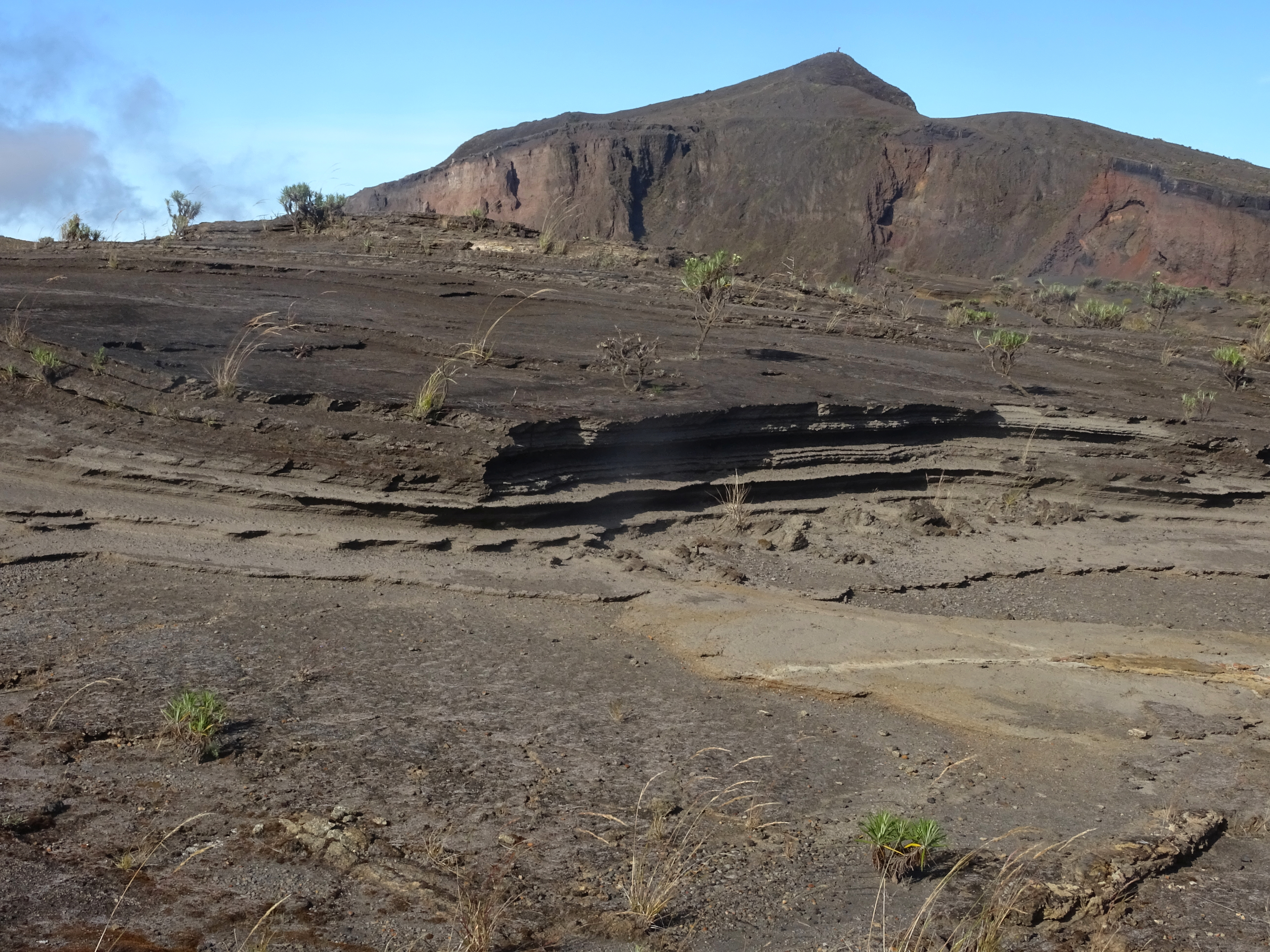
Tephra layers near the caldera (left) and summit (background) of Mount Tambora

A team led by the Swiss botanist Heinrich Zollinger arrived on Sumbawa in 1847. Zollinger sought to study the area of eruption and its effects on the local ecosystem. He was the first person after the eruption to ascend the summit, which was still covered by smoke. As Zollinger climbed, his feet sank several times through a thin surface crust into a warm layer of powder-like sulfur. Some vegetation had regrown, including trees on the lower slope. A Casuarina forest was noted at 2,200 to 2,550 metres (7,220 to 8,370 ft), while several Imperata cylindrica grasslands were also found. In August 2015 a team of Georesearch Volcanedo Germany followed the way used by Zollinger and explored this way for the first time since 1847. Because of the length of the distance to be travelled on foot, the partly very high temperatures and the lack of water it was a particular challenge for the team of Georesearch Volcanedo.

Resettlement of the area began in 1907, and a coffee plantation was established in the 1930s in the Pekat village on the northwestern slope. A dense rain forest of Duabanga moluccana trees had grown at an altitude of 1,000 to 2,800 metres (3,300 to 9,200 ft). It covers an area up to 80,000 hectares (200,000 acres). The rain forest was discovered by a Dutch team, led by Koster and de Voogd in 1933. From their accounts, they started their journey in a "fairly barren, dry and hot country", and then they entered "a mighty jungle" with "huge, majestic forest giants". At 1,100 metres (3,600 ft), the trees became thinner in shape. Above 1,800 metres (5,900 ft), they found Dodonaea viscosa flowering plants dominated by Casuarina trees. On the summit was sparse "edelweiss" (though true alpine edelweiss is not found in Indonesia) and Wahlenbergia.

An 1896 survey records 56 species of birds including the crested white-eye. Several other zoological surveys followed and found other bird species, with over 90 bird species discoveries in this period, including yellow-crested cockatoos, Zoothera thrushes, Hill mynas, green junglefowl and rainbow lorikeets are hunted for the cagebird trade by the local people. Orange-footed scrubfowl are hunted for food. This bird exploitation has resulted in population declines, and the yellow-crested cockatoo is nearing extinction on Sumbawa island.

A commercial logging company began to operate in the area in 1972, posing a threat to the rain forest. The company holds a timber-cutting concession for an area of 20,000 hectares (49,000 acres), or 25% of the total area. Another part of the rain forest is used as a hunting ground. In between the hunting ground and the logging area is a designated wildlife reserve where deer, water buffalos, wild pigs, bats, flying foxes and species of reptiles and birds can be found. In 2015, the conservation area protecting the mountain's ecosystem was upgraded to a national park.

=== Exploration of the caldera floor ===
360-degree digital elevation model (DEM) animation of Mount Tambora and its central caldera.

Zollinger (1847), van Rheden (1913) and W. A. Petroeschevsky (1947) could only observe the caldera floor from the crater rim. In 2013, a German research team (Georesearch Volcanedo Germany) for the first time carried out a longer expedition into this caldera, about 1,300 metres (4,300 ft) deep, and with the help of a native team climbed down the southern caldera wall, reaching the caldera floor while experiencing extreme conditions. The team stayed in the caldera for nine days. People had reached the caldera floor only in a few cases as the descent down the steep wall is difficult and dangerous, subject to earthquakes, landslides and rockfalls. Moreover, only relatively short stays on the caldera floor had been possible because of logistical problems, so that extensive studies had been impossible. The investigation program of Georesearch Volcanedo on the caldera floor included researching the visible effects of smaller eruptions which had taken place since 1815, gas measurements, studies of flora and fauna and measurement of weather data. Especially striking was the relatively high activity of Doro Api Toi ("Gunung Api Kecil" means "small volcano") in the southern part of the caldera and the gases escaping under high pressure on the lower north-east wall. Besides the team discovered near the Doro Api Toi a lavadome which had not yet been mentioned in scientific studies. The team called this new discovery "Adik Api Toi (Indonesian "adik": younger brother). Later this lavadome was called by the Indonesians "Doro Api Bou" ("new volcano"). This lavadome probably appeared in 2011/2012 when there was an increased seismic activity and probably volcanic activity on the caldera floor (no exact information about the caldera floor exists at that time). In 2014 the same research team carried out a further expedition into the caldera and set a new record: over 12 days the investigations of 2013 were continued.

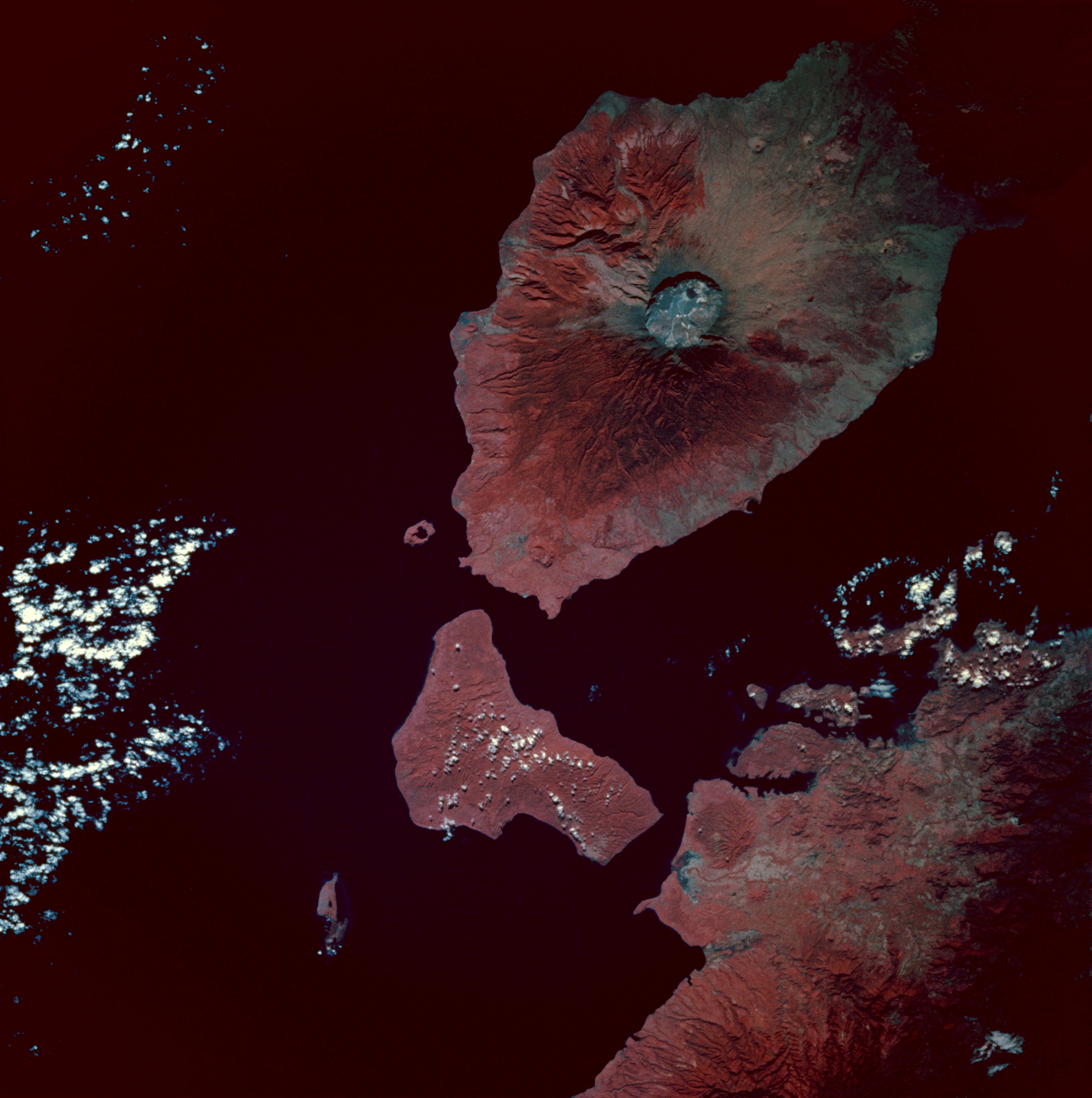
An infrared image of Mount Tambora (north is on the left)

== Monitoring ==
Indonesia's population has been increasing rapidly since the 1815 eruption. In 2020, the population of the country reached 270 million people, of which 56% concentrated on the island of Java. An event as significant as the 1815 eruption would impact about eight million people.

Seismic activity in Indonesia is monitored by the Directorate of Volcanology and Geological Hazard Mitigation with the monitoring post for Mount Tambora located at Doro Peti village. They focus on seismic and tectonic activity by using a seismograph. There has been no significant increase in seismic activity since the 1880 eruption. Monitoring is continuously performed inside the caldera, with a focus on the parasitic cone Doro Api Toi.

The directorate created a disaster mitigation map for Mount Tambora, which designates two zones for an eruption: a dangerous zone and a cautious zone. The dangerous zone identifies areas that would be directly affected by pyroclastic flows, lava flows or pyroclastic falls. It includes areas such as the caldera and its surroundings, a span of up to 58.7 square kilometres (14,500 acres) where habitation is prohibited. The cautious zone consists of land that might be indirectly affected, either by lahar flows and other pumice stones. The size of the cautious area is 185 square kilometres (46,000 acres), and includes Pasanggrahan, Doro Peti, Rao, Labuan Kenanga, Gubu Ponda, Kawindana Toi and Hoddo villages. A river, called Guwu, at the southern and northwest part of the mountain is also included in the cautious zone.

=== Recent unrest ===
Since the middle of 2025, volcanic unrest in the form of deep earthquakes has increased. On March 10, 2026, The Center for Volcanology and Geological Hazard/Pusat Vulkanologi dan Mitigasi Bencana Geologi (CVGHM/PVMBG) raised the alert level of Tambora from alert level 1 to alert level 2 due to an increased number of deep volcanic earthquakes. The public was told to stay at least 3 km from Tambora. Activity also included: tectonic seismicity, deep volcanic seismicity (Type A/vulkanik dalam), volcano-tectonic (VT) seismicity. The PVMBG further clarified in January 2026, 267 deep volcanic earthquakes were reported. By February, the number of earthquakes increased substantially to 453. This is interpreted as magma moving closer to the surface. Earthquake activity stayed high in the month of March. Between March 1-9, 88 earthquakes were recorded along with rockfalls. No emissions were visible, but weather did obstruct viewing at times.

== Panorama ==
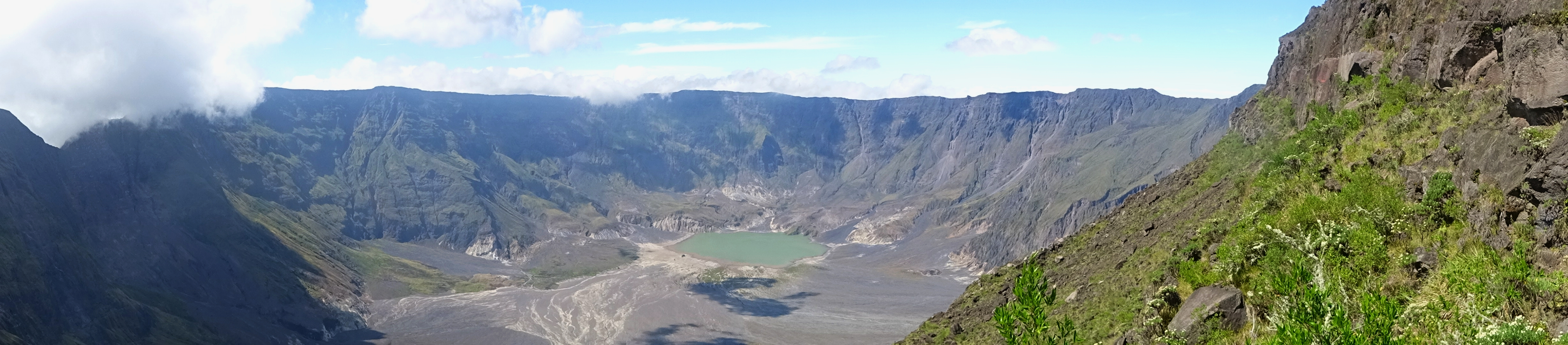
Panorama of the caldera of Mount Tambora, July 2017

== See also ==
- List of volcanoes in Indonesia
- List of ultras of the Malay Archipelago
- Mount Rinjani
- Krakatoa
- Mount Paektu
