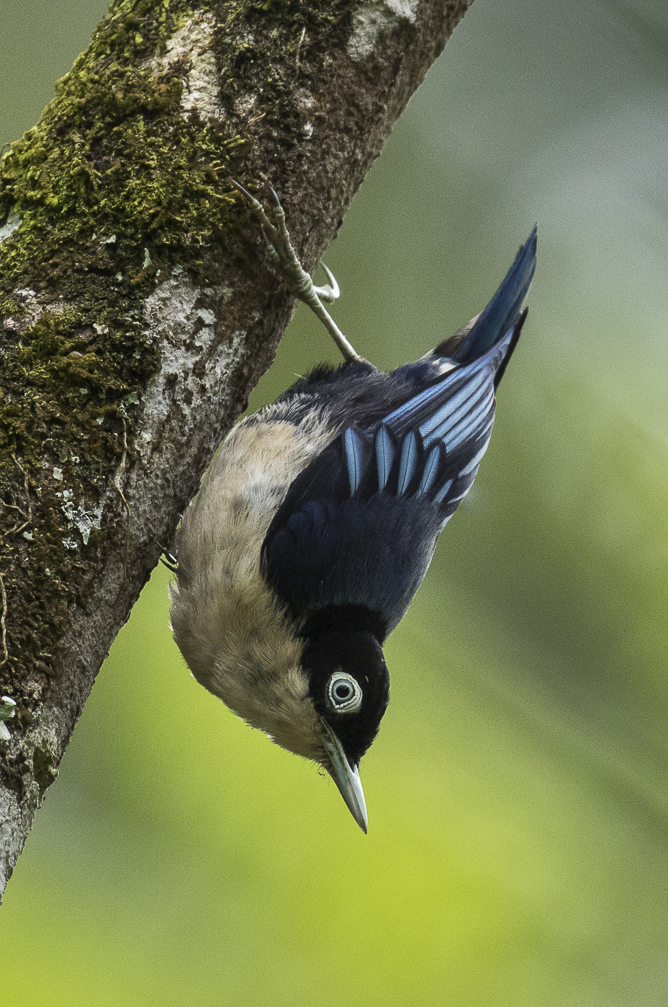
- Blue nuthatch at Cibodas Botanical Garden, Java, Indonesia

Conservation status
- Least Concern (IUCN 3.1)

Scientific classification
- Kingdom: Animalia
- Phylum: Chordata
- Class: Aves
- Order: Passeriformes
- Family: Sittidae
- Genus: Sitta
- Species: S. azurea

Binomial name
- Sitta azurea Lesson, 1830
- Blue nuthatch range

Synonyms
- • Callisitta azurea (Lesson, 1830) • Poliositta azurea (Lesson, 1830) • Dendrophila flavipes (Swainson, 1838) • Sitta flavipes (Swainson, 1838)

= Blue nuthatch =

Species of small passerine bird

The blue nuthatch (Sitta azurea) is a bird species in the nuthatch family Sittidae. It is a medium-sized nuthatch, measuring 13.5 cm (5.3 in) in length. The species, which shows slight sexual dimorphism, has dramatic plumage pattern unlike any other member of its genus. Its head is black or blackish-blue dark blue upperparts close to purple with azure feathers. The wings are edged with black. The throat and chest are white or a washed buff, contrasting with the upperparts and the belly of a very dark blue; the covert feathers are generally clear, blue-grey or purplish.

The blue nuthatch's ecology is poorly known, but it feeds on small invertebrates found on trees; reproduction takes place from April to June or July. It also forages in mixed-species flocks in larger groups. They can be found in the Malay Peninsula and on the islands of Sumatra and Java in Indonesia, where it inhabits subtropical or tropical moist lowland forest and subtropical or tropical moist montane forest above 900 m (3,000 ft) in altitude.

Three subspecies are accepted: S. a. expectata, S. a. nigriventer and S. a. azurea, which differ chiefly in the colour of their mantles, chests and bellies. The species' closest relatives are the velvet-fronted nuthatch (S. frontalis), the yellow-billed nuthatch (S. solangiae) and the sulphur-billed nuthatch (S. oenochlamys). The population of the species has not been determined but the species appears to be at low risk of extinction because of the extent of its distribution. It has been classified as of least concern by the International Union for Conservation of Nature.

== Taxonomy ==
The blue nuthatch was first described in 1830 under its current binomial name, Sitta azurea, by the French naturalist René Primevère Lesson (1794–1849). Sitta is derived from the Ancient Greek name for nuthatches, σίττη, sittē. The genus has occasionally been divided into seven subgenera, of which the blue nuthatch is placed alone in Poecilositta (Buturlin 1916).

The name "nuthatch", first recorded in 1350, is derived from "nut" and a word probably related to "hack", since these birds hack at nuts they have wedged into crevices.

The nuthatches constitute a genus, Sitta, of small passerine birds in the family Sittidae, typified by short, compressed wings and short, square tails with 12 feathers, a compact body, longish pointed bills, strong toes with long claws, and behaviourally, by their unique head-first manner of descending tree trunks. Most nuthatches have blue-grey upperparts and a black eyestripe. In 2006, the ornithologist Edward C. Dickinson proposed splitting Sitta in multiple genera on the basis of distinct morphological traits. He suggested as candidates the velvet-fronted nuthatch (Sitta frontalis) and the blue nuthatch, the morphology of which he describes as "rather aberrant ... in spite of a character trait (white edges to wing feathers) shared with Sitta formosa", and that doing so might, in turn, require the beautiful nuthatch (S. formosa) to be split off as well. He stated, however, that a molecular study would be warranted prior to any re-classification.

In 2014, Eric Pasquet and colleagues published a phylogeny based on examination of nuclear and mitochondrial DNA of 21 nuthatch species. The position of the blue nuthatch within the genus was not established with certainty, having a far lower correlation than many others in the model. Nevertheless, under the findings the species appears best represented by a clade comprising the velvet-fronted nuthatch and the sulphur-billed nuthatch S. oenochlamys (and presumably also the very similar yellow-billed nuthatch S. solangiae, which remains untested). These tropical Asian nuthatches are themselves a sister clade to one comprising the subgenus Sitta (Micrositta) (sometimes called the S. canadensis group), along with the brown-headed nuthatch (S. pusilla) and the pygmy nuthatch (S. pygmaea). These results were confirmed by a further study in 2020 by Martin Päckert and colleagues.

Phylogenetic tree detail
Nuthatch phylogenic detail according to Pasquet, et al. (2014):

- Weakly-supported clade
      - Brown-headed nuthatch (S. pusilla)
      - Pygmy nuthatch (S. pygmaea)
    - Sitta canadensis group
    - Blue nuthatch (S. azurea)
      - Velvet-fronted nuthatch (S. frontalis)
      - Sulphur-billed nuthatch (S. oenochlamys)

=== Subspecies ===
Three subspecies of blue nuthatch are accepted:

- S. a. expectata (Hartert, 1914), described in 1914 by German ornithologist Ernst Hartert as Callisitta azurea expectata from a holotype from the Semangko Pass in Pahang on the Malay Peninsula; it is also found in Sumatra;
- S. a. nigriventer (Robinson & Kloss, 1919), described in 1919 by British zoologists Herbert Robinson and Cecil Kloss as Poliositta azurea nigriventer from a holotype from Mount Gede in West Java, Indonesia. The British ornithologist William Swainson had earlier described it under the name Dendrophila flavipes in 1838, but this name was little used subsequently, and can be considered a nomen oblitum ("forgotten name");
- S. a. azurea (Lesson, 1830) the nominate subspecies, was described in 1830 by René Lesson from a specimen possibly from the Arjuno-Welirang stratovolcano; inhabits central and eastern Java.

== Description ==
The blue nuthatch is a medium-sized nuthatch that has an average length of 13.5 cm (5.3 in). The weight is not known. Its appearance differs significantly from all other nuthatches. All of its subspecies are broadly black and white (especially when viewed in low-light conditions in which their dark blue colour is not apparent) and have upper plumage shot through with dramatic notes of cobalt, azure and other lighter shades of blue, as well as greys and purples. The head is black, or blackish-blue with a broad, pale blue eye ring.

The three subspecies vary in the colour of their mantle, chest and belly. The upperparts are dark blue at the mantle or purplish in some subspecies. The rectrices are pale blue in the middle with a black border and contrast sharply with the dark areas of the coat. The throat and breast are white, or washed buff, especially in S. a. nigriventer. The belly and abdomen are blackish, contrasting with blue-grey or purplish coverts. The bill is lavender, slightly tinged with green, and black at the tip; the legs are a pale blue-grey and the claws are slate-grey or black.

The species displays no significant sexual dimorphism, but the Japanese ornithologist Nagamichi Kuroda describes the female as having slightly duller upperparts. Juveniles resemble adults, but have a duller crown and ear coverts, as well as a brown cast that does not cover their entire body. The belly is a dull black and the undertail coverts are variably edged creamy white. The juvenile's bill is blackish, with a pink base. Adults experience a partial moult before the breeding season (February–March for S. a. expectata; March–April for S. a. azurea) involving the throat, chest and mantle; a complete moult takes place after the breeding season (March–April and August in Java in Malaysia).

The three subspecies and their distinct morphological characteristics

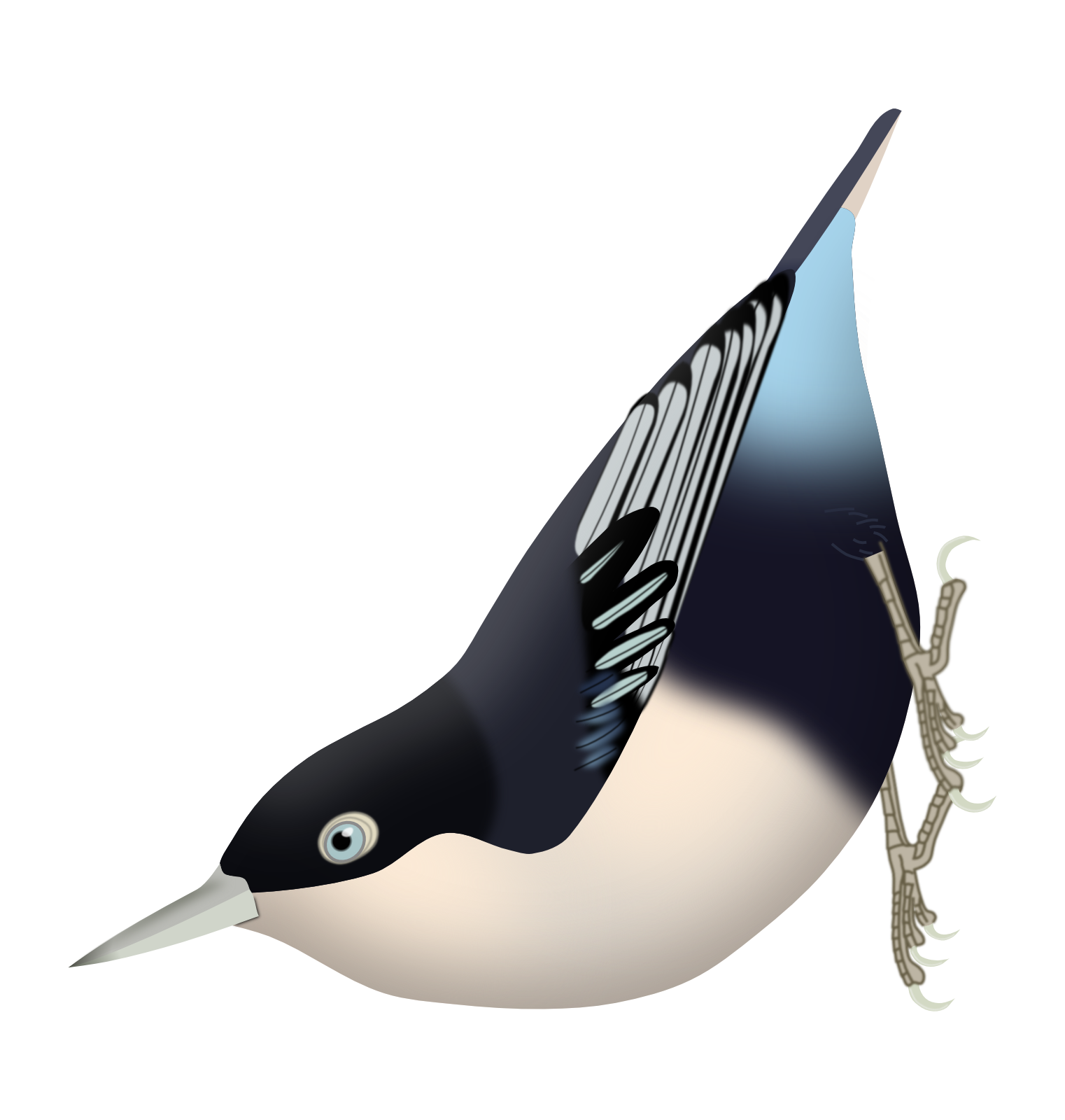
Sitta azurea expectata - Malay Peninsula, Sumatra
Dark blue upper parts and azure coverts.

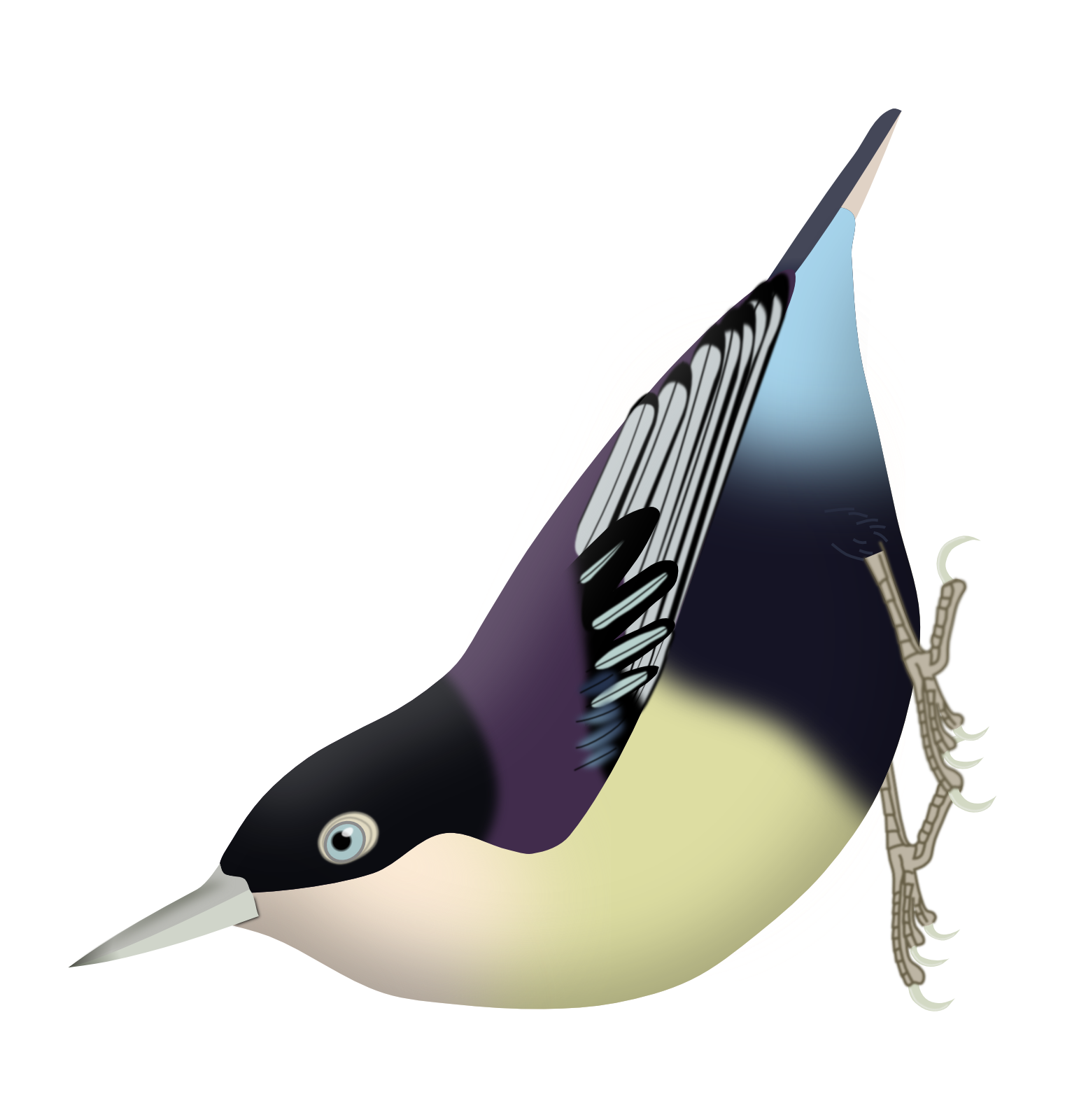
Sitta azurea nigriventer - Western Java
Purplish-blue upper parts, blue coverts and buffy belly.

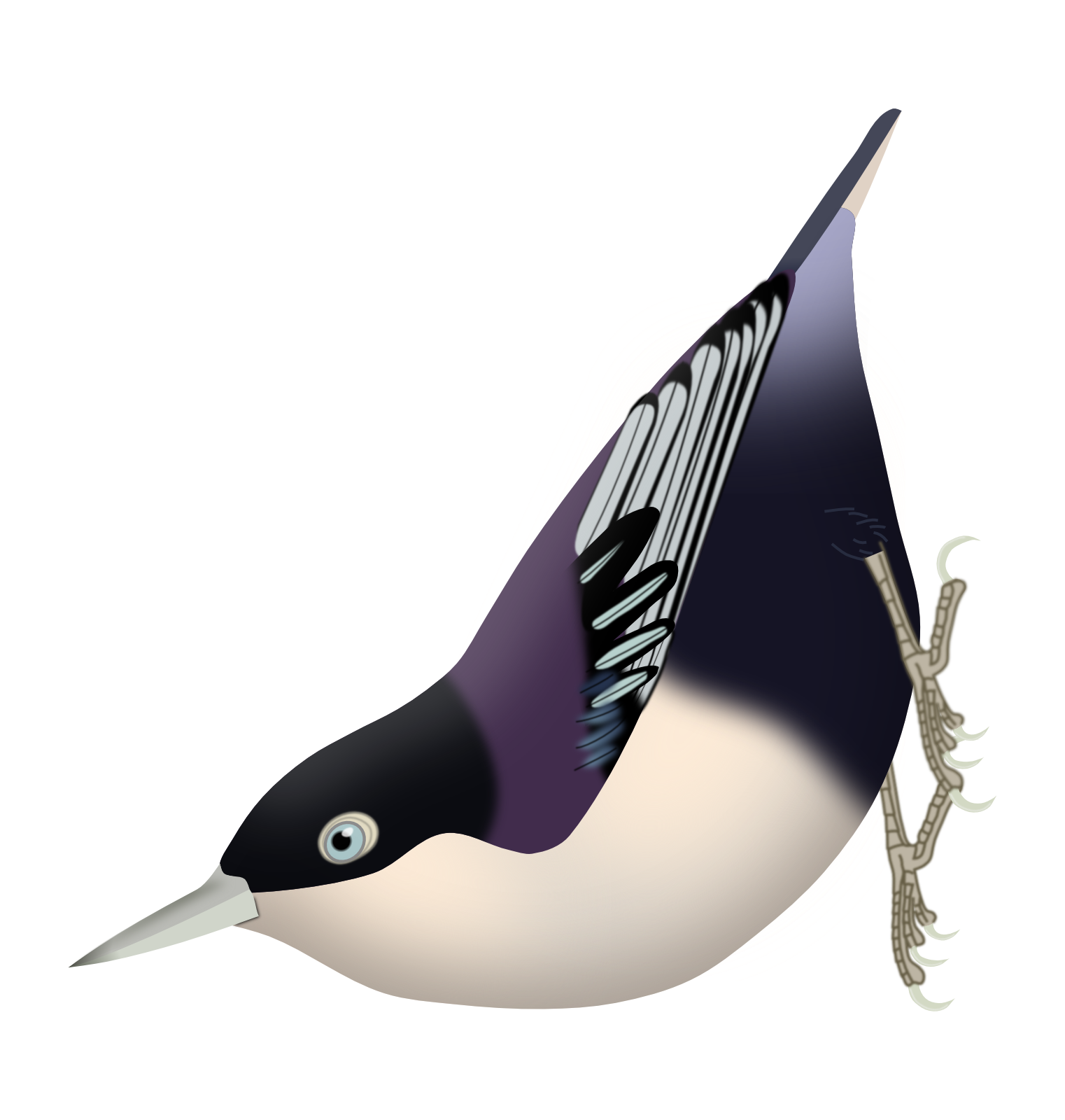
Sitta azurea azurea - Central and eastern Java
Purple upper parts and violet coverts.

=== Songs and calls ===
The species' calls include a melodious tup or tip, a sudden whit, a thin hissing sit, and a fuller, harder, and more forceful chit. When excited, sit and chit notes are frequently given quickly and repetitively as a chi-chit, chit-chit-chit or chir-ri-rit, which can be prolonged, accelerated into staccato trilling tititititititik, or even becoming a rattling tr-r-r-r-r-r-t. Other calls include a thin, squeaking zhe and zhe-zhe, a squeaky toy-like nasal snieu or kneu, and a buzzy chirr-u. The vocal repertoire of the blue nuthatch is quite varied and is reminiscent of the velvet-fronted nuthatch and, to a lesser extent, the sulphur-billed nuthatch.

== Behaviour and ecology ==
A blue nuthatch of subspecies S. a. expectata foraging in a tree, Fraser's Hill, Malaysia

The blue nuthatch is very active, often seen running on tree branches in pairs, in larger groups, or mingling in mixed-species foraging flocks.

=== Diet ===
The blue nuthatch feeds on arthropods, of which some have been particularly identified as common in its diet, including Trachypholis beetles, click beetles, Eumolpinae leaf beetles, spiders, and moth caterpillars. It typically forages for prey in the upper half of large trees, and occasionally in smaller trees. While prospecting on tree trunks, the bird protects its corneas from falling bark and other debris by contracting the bare skin around its eyes, an adaptation apparently unique to the species.

=== Breeding ===
Its breeding has not been extensively studied. The nest is made in a small tree hole in which it lays three to four dirty-white eggs, washed in greyish-lavender tones and densely speckled with reddish-brown; the eggs measure 19.3 mm × 13.4 mm (0.76 in × 0.53 in). In Peninsular Malaysia, juveniles just reaching maturity were observed in late June; on the island of Java, the breeding season takes place from April to July; and on Sumatra an adult feeding its young was observed on 9 May.

=== Predation ===
Little has been specifically reported on blue nuthatch predators, but one individual was seen to freeze during the passage of a prospecting black eagle (Ictinaetus malayensis).

== Distribution and habitat ==
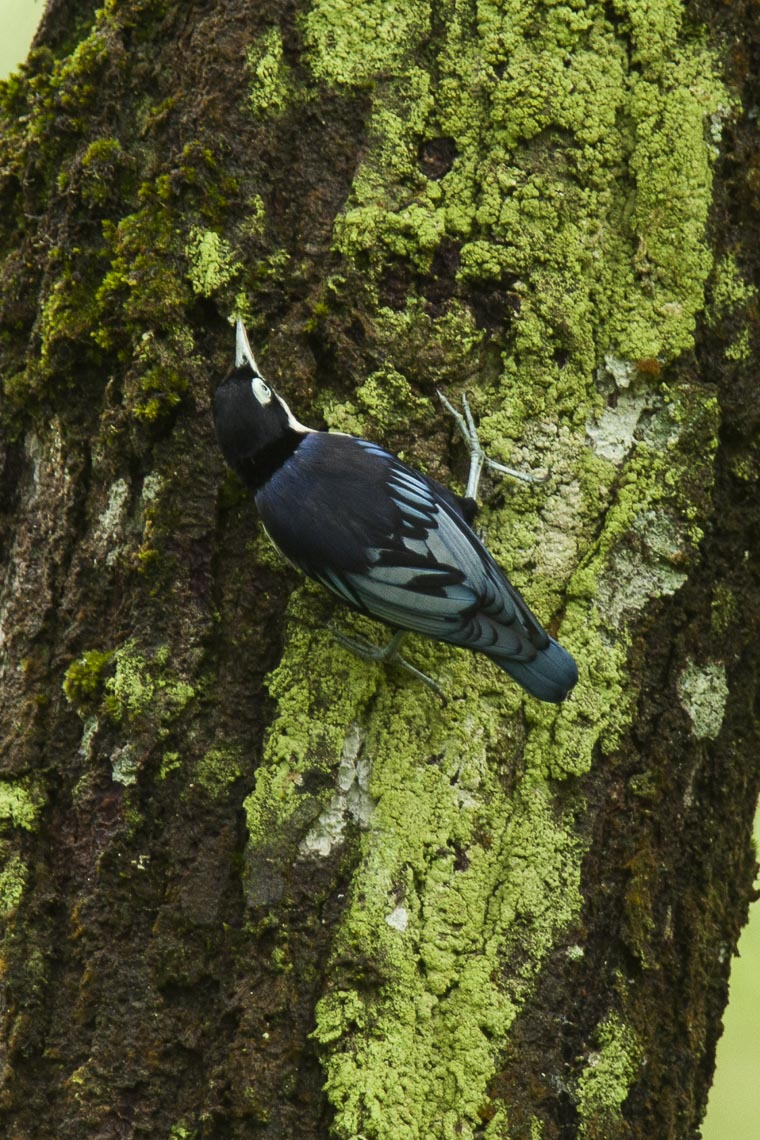
A blue nuthatch on a tree trunk at Fraser's Hill, Malaysia.

This species lives in the Malay Peninsula (in extreme southern Thailand and northern Malaysia) and in Indonesia on the islands of Sumatra and Java. In Malaysia, the species has been observed in Bukit Larut, in the state of Perak, in the Titiwangsa Mountains, in southern Hulu Langat, in the state of Selangor, as well as some isolated populations on the slopes of the massive Mount Benom in the state of Pahang, on Mount Tahan located at the Pahang-Kelantan border, on Mount Rabong in Kelantan and at Mount Padang in the Sultanate of Terengganu.

In Sumatra, the bird is found throughout the Barisan Mountains, and has been observed in the Gayo Highlands of Aceh province, the Batak Highlands of northern Sumatra, and at Dempo in the south of the island. In a 1918 expedition by Robinson and Kloss, they commented: "from the commencement of heavy jungle on the valley slopes up to about 8,000 feet on Korinchi Peak this strikingly coloured little Nuthatch was very common, feeding on tall tree trunks in parties of six or seven."

The blue nuthatch is typically found on mountains, inhabiting subtropical or tropical moist lowland forest and subtropical or tropical moist montane forest. In Malaysia, it is found from 1,070 m (3,510 ft) to the highest point in the country at 2,186 m (7,172 ft). In Sumatra, the species has been reported at an altitudinal range of between 900 m (3,000 ft) and 2,400 m (7,900 ft), and on Java, between 915 m (3,002 ft) and 2,745 m (9,006 ft). It has also been seen occasionally at lower altitudes on the plains of Java.

== Threats and protection ==
The blue nuthatch is a common bird in Sumatra, including in the area of Kerinci Seblat National Park and relatively common in Malaysia and Java. It has a very wide distribution area, approaching 361,000 km^{2} (139,000 sq mi). The population has not been rigorously estimated but is considered significant and at low risk, despite BirdLife International's observation that some decline is likely (but not as yet confirmed) due to known destruction and fragmentation of areas the species is known to inhabit. The blue nuthatch is placed in the category of least concern by the International Union for Conservation of Nature.

== Footnotes ==
1. Being Callisitta, Poecilositta, Oenositta, Sitta, Mesositta, Micrositta and Leptositta.
2. The 21 species are out of 24 accepted as making up the genus by Harrap and Quinn as of 1996. Of these, the study omitted the Indian nuthatch (Sitta castanea), the yellow-billed nuthatch (Sitta solangiae) and the white-browed nuthatch (Sitta victoriae). The International Ornithological Congress now accepts 29 species as of 2025, based on the elevation of five taxa from subspecies to full species status, including Przevalski's nuthatch (S. przewalskii), Bahama nuthatch (S. insularis), and three species from the S. europaea group.

== Bibliography ==
- Harrap, Simon (1996). Christopher Helm (ed.). Tits, Nuthatches and Treecreepers. Illustrated by David Quinn. Christopher Helm. ISBN 0-7136-3964-4.
- Matthysen, Erik (2010). The Nuthatches. Illustrated by David Quinn. A & C Black. ISBN 978-1-4081-2870-1.
