= Sonneratia hainanensis =

Conservation status
- Critically Endangered (IUCN 2.3)

Scientific classification
- Kingdom: Plantae
- Clade: Tracheophytes
- Clade: Angiosperms
- Clade: Eudicots
- Clade: Rosids
- Order: Myrtales
- Family: Lythraceae
- Genus: Sonneratia
- Species: S. hainanensis

Binomial name
- Sonneratia hainanensis Ko, E.Y. Chen & S.Y. Chen

Species of flowering plant

Sonneratia hainanensis, the Hainan sonneratia, is a species of plant in the family Lythraceae.

It is endemic to Hainan island/province in southeastern China.
