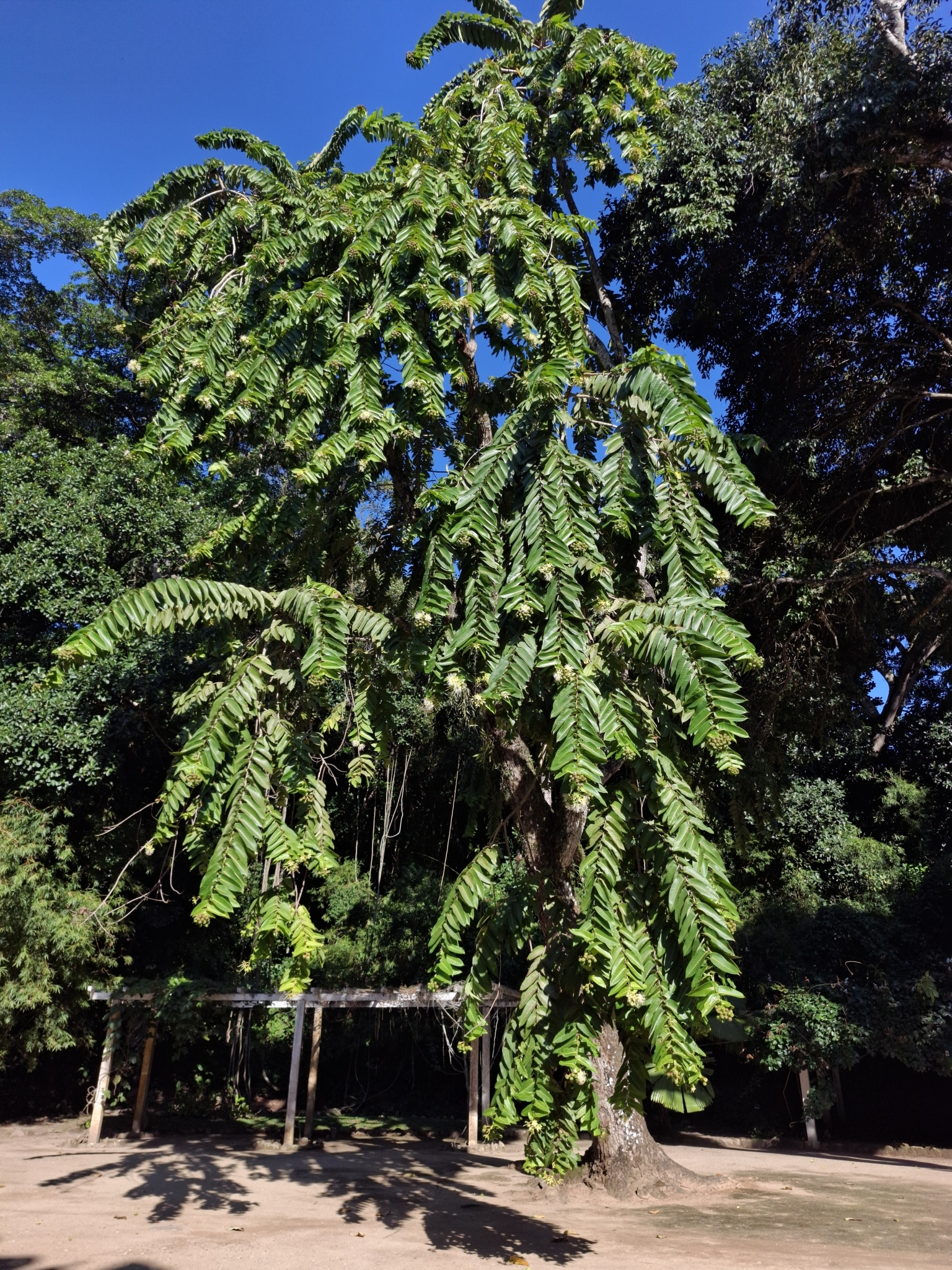

Conservation status
- Least Concern (IUCN 3.1)

Scientific classification
- Kingdom: Plantae
- Clade: Tracheophytes
- Clade: Angiosperms
- Clade: Eudicots
- Clade: Rosids
- Order: Myrtales
- Family: Lythraceae
- Genus: Duabanga
- Species: D. grandiflora

Binomial name
- Duabanga grandiflora (Roxb. ex DC.) Walpers

= Duabanga grandiflora =

Species of flowering plant

Duabanga grandiflora (syn. D. sonneratioides) is a species of evergreen tropical tree. From its peculiar habit, it is a singular feature in its native forests. The trunk is erect, 40–80 feet high, undivided but sometimes forking from the base. The lower limbs spread drooping from the trunk; these are long, slender, sparingly branched, and the branches are four-angled, loosely covered with large spreading leaves. Since the leaves are arranged in two ranks, the slender branches resemble petioles, bearing pinnae of a compound leaf; the leaves are further often recurved, and are deep green above, and almost white beneath. The large blossoms expand in April, exhaling a rank odour reportedly resembling asafoetida when they first burst, but they become inodorous before the petals drop. The stamens are all bent inwards in bud. The fruit is a large as a small apple. The wood is white and soft.

== Distribution ==
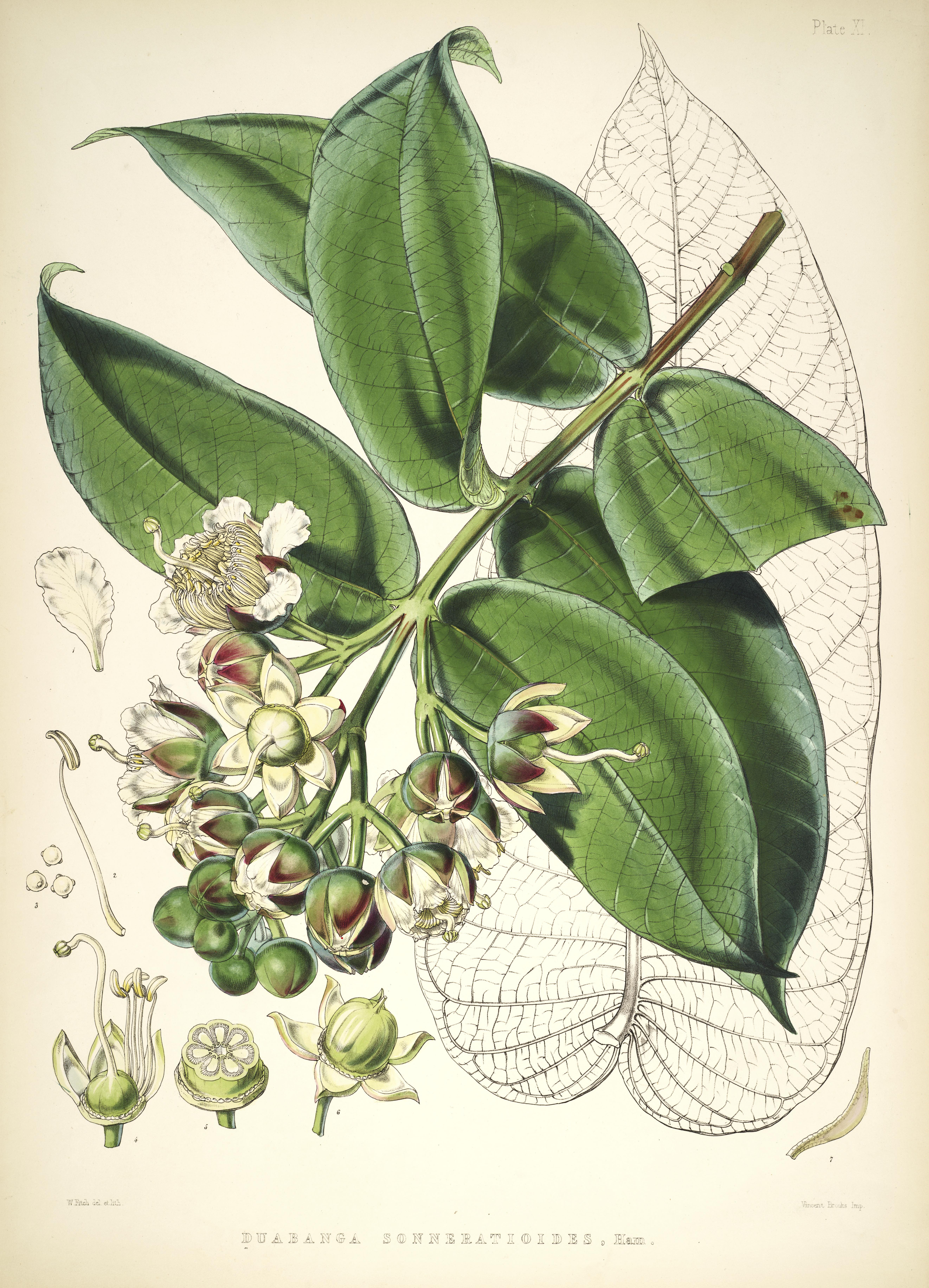
Plate XI in Illustrations of Himalayan plants

Native to India, Nepal, southern China, Myanmar and Malaysia.

== Gallery ==
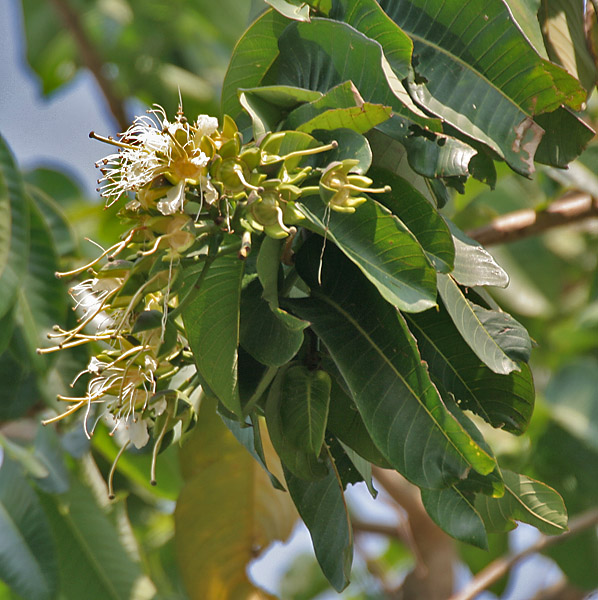
Flowers at Jayanti in Buxa Tiger Reserve in Jalpaiguri district of West Bengal, India

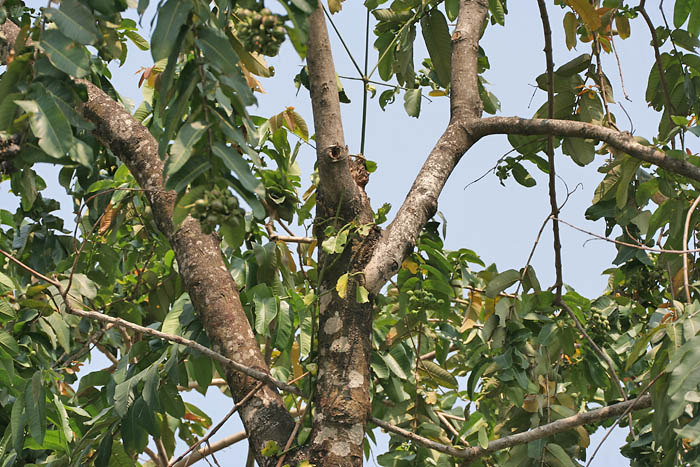
Middle story at Jayanti

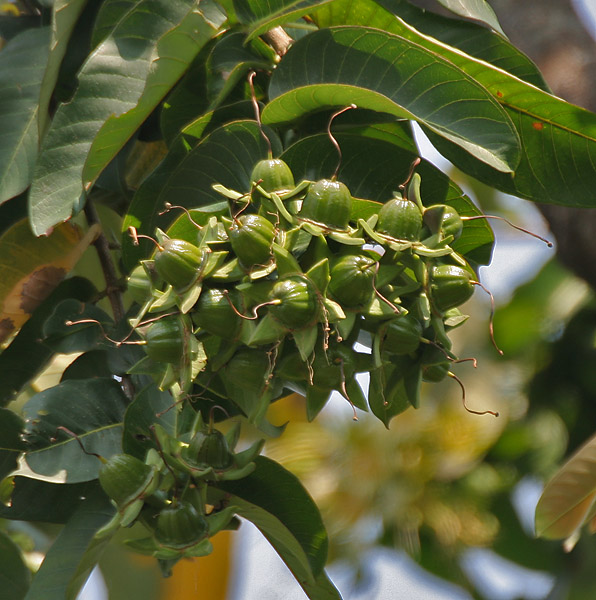
At Jayanti

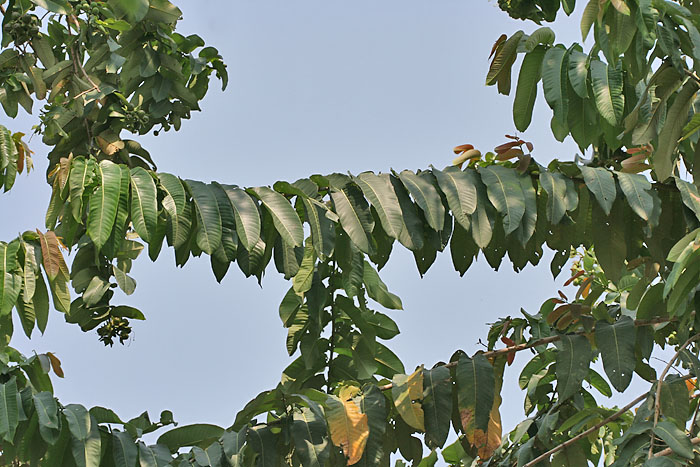
Leaves at Jayanti
