= Sonneratiaceae =

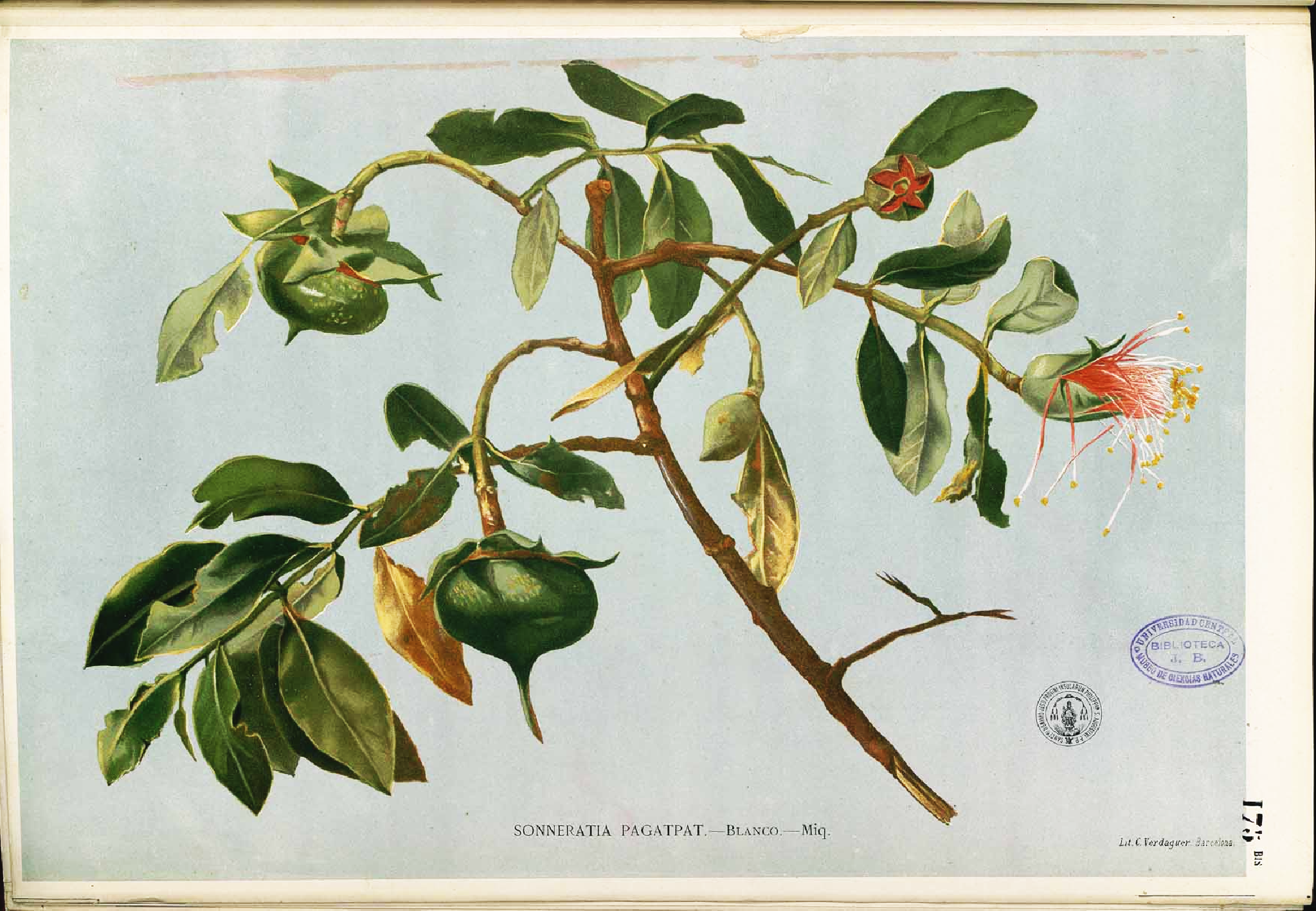
Sonneratia pagatpat

Sonneratiaceae were a family of flowering plants placed in the order Myrtales by the Cronquist system. They consisted of two genera, Sonneratia and Duabanga. These are now generally placed in their own monotypic subfamilies of the family Lythraceae, making Sonneratiaceae superfluous.

The family is named for French naturalist Pierre Sonnerat.
