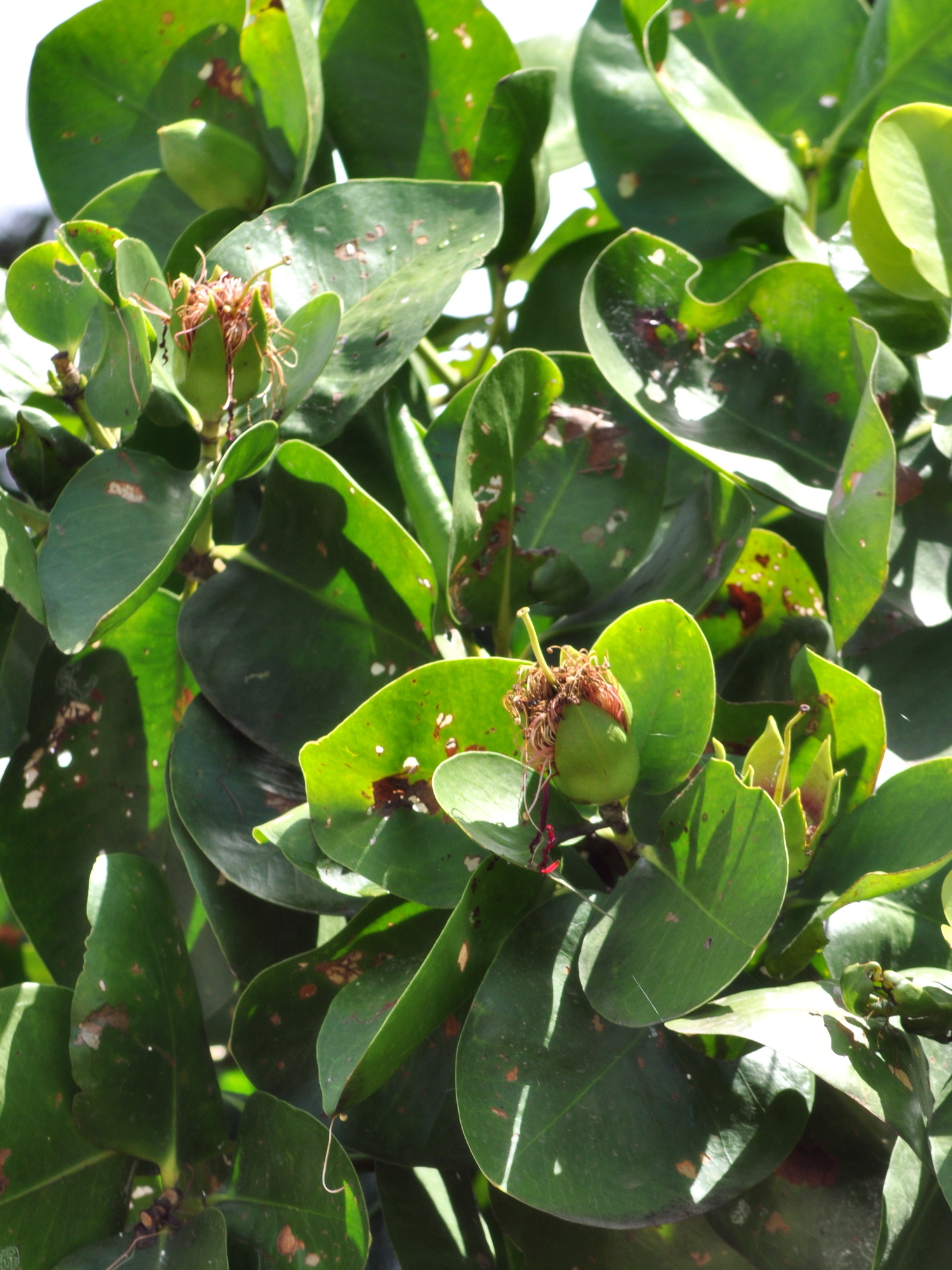
- In Raja Ampat, Indonesia

Conservation status
- Near Threatened (IUCN 3.1)

Scientific classification
- Kingdom: Plantae
- Clade: Tracheophytes
- Clade: Angiosperms
- Clade: Eudicots
- Clade: Rosids
- Order: Myrtales
- Family: Lythraceae
- Genus: Sonneratia
- Species: S. ovata

Binomial name
- Sonneratia ovata Backer

= Sonneratia ovata =

Species of plant

Sonneratia ovata is a mangrove tree in the family Lythraceae. The specific epithet ovata is from the Latin meaning 'oval', referring to the shape of the leaf.

== Description ==
Sonneratia ovata grows up to 20 metres (70 ft) tall with a trunk diameter of up to 20 centimetres (8 in). The grey bark is smooth to fissured bark. The calyx is cup-shaped with its inner surface reddish at the base. The fruits, dark green when young and ripening to yellowish green, measure up to 7 cm (3 in) long.

== Distribution and habitat ==
Sonneratia ovata grows naturally from southern China (Hainan) to Indochina, Malesia, Palau, New Guinea and Australia. Its habitat is on tidal river banks and on muddy soils subject to spring tides.

== Uses ==
The mature fruit is eaten in Sarawak.
