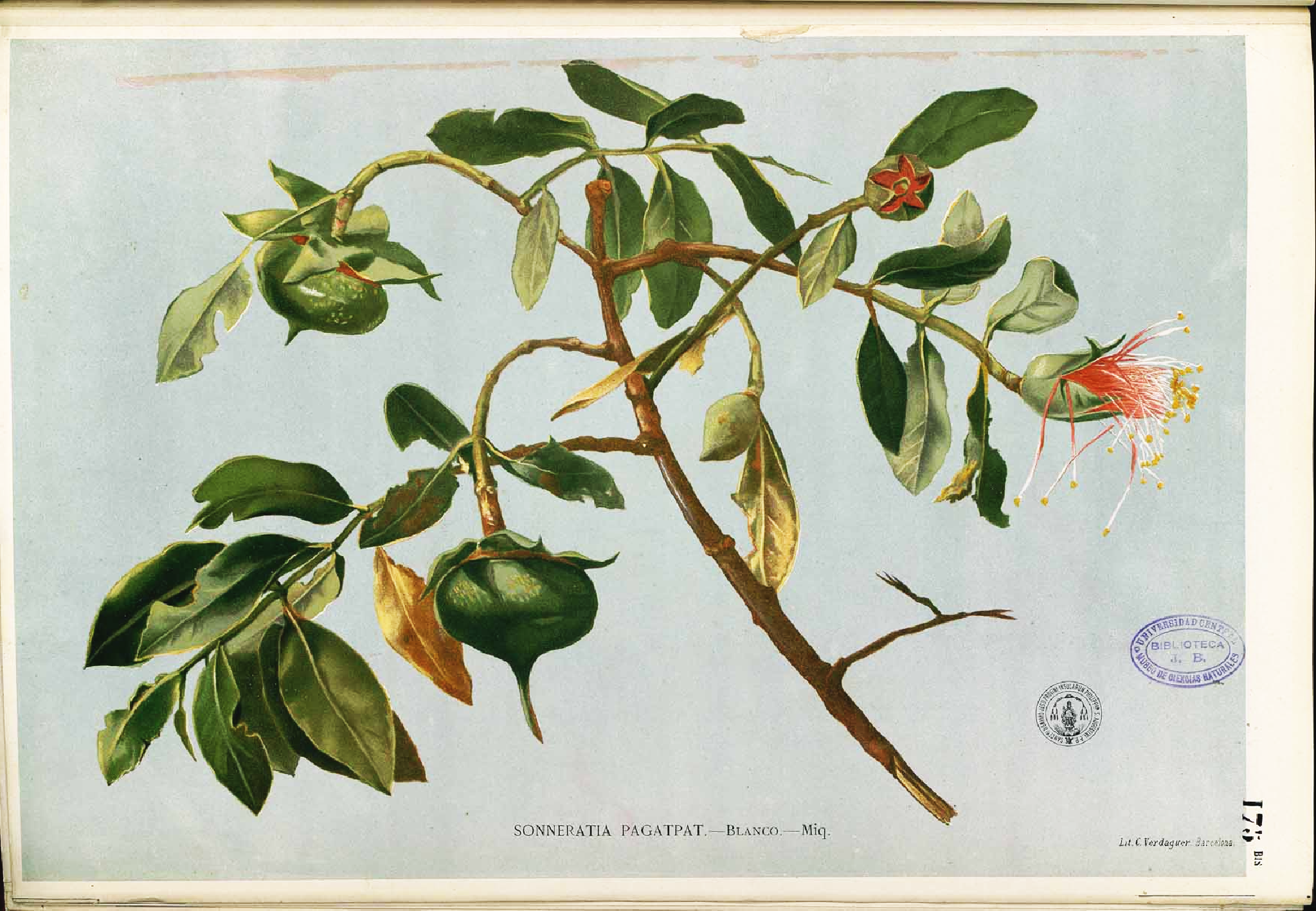
- Sonneratia pagatpat (Blanco 1837)

Scientific classification
- Kingdom: Plantae
- Clade: Tracheophytes
- Clade: Angiosperms
- Clade: Eudicots
- Clade: Rosids
- Order: Myrtales
- Family: Lythraceae
- Subfamily: Sonneratioideae (Engl. & Gilg 1924) S.A.Graham, Thorne & Reveal
- Genus: Sonneratia; L.f.

Synonyms
- Blatti James Edward Smith

= Sonneratia =

Genus of trees

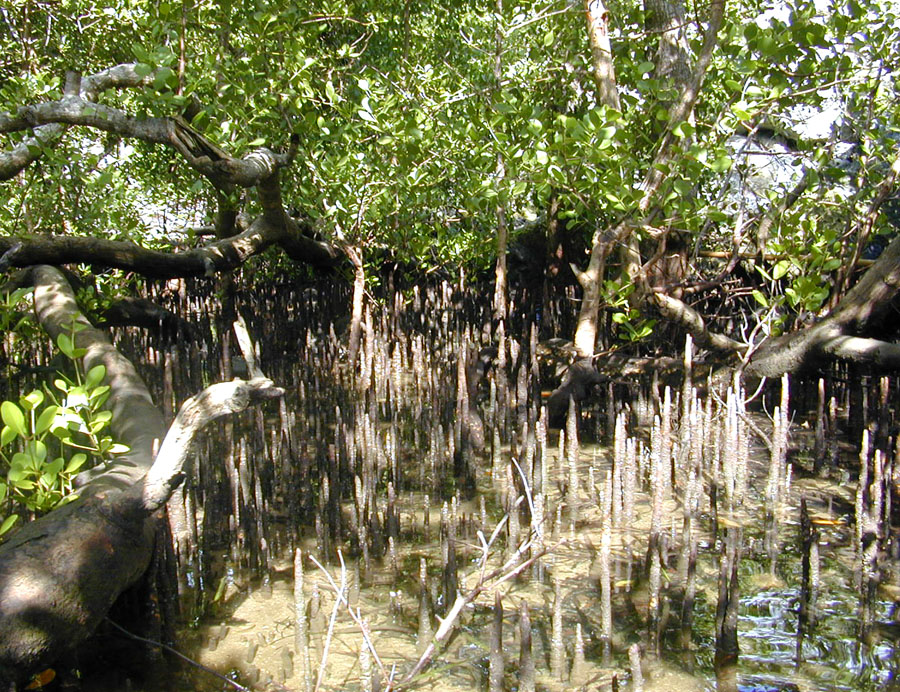
Mangrove trees and pneumatophores of genus Sonneratia on the coast of Yap

Sonneratia is a genus of plants in the family Lythraceae. Formerly the Sonneratia were placed in a family called Sonneratiaceae which included both the Sonneratia and the Duabanga, but these two are now placed in their own monotypic subfamilies of the family Lythraceae. The genus was also named Blatti by James Edward Smith, but Sonneratia had botanical nomenclature priority. Sonneratia species are mangrove trees.

== Species ==
The genus Sonneratia has the following species:

- Sonneratia alba Sm.
- Sonneratia apetala Banks
- Sonneratia caseolaris (L.) Engl.
- Sonneratia griffithii Kurz
- Sonneratia × gulngai N.C.Duke
- Sonneratia × hainanensis W.C.Ko, E.Y.Chen & W.Y.Chen
- Sonneratia lanceolata Blume
- Sonneratia ovata Backer
- Sonneratia × urama N.C.Duke

== See also ==
- Mangroves
