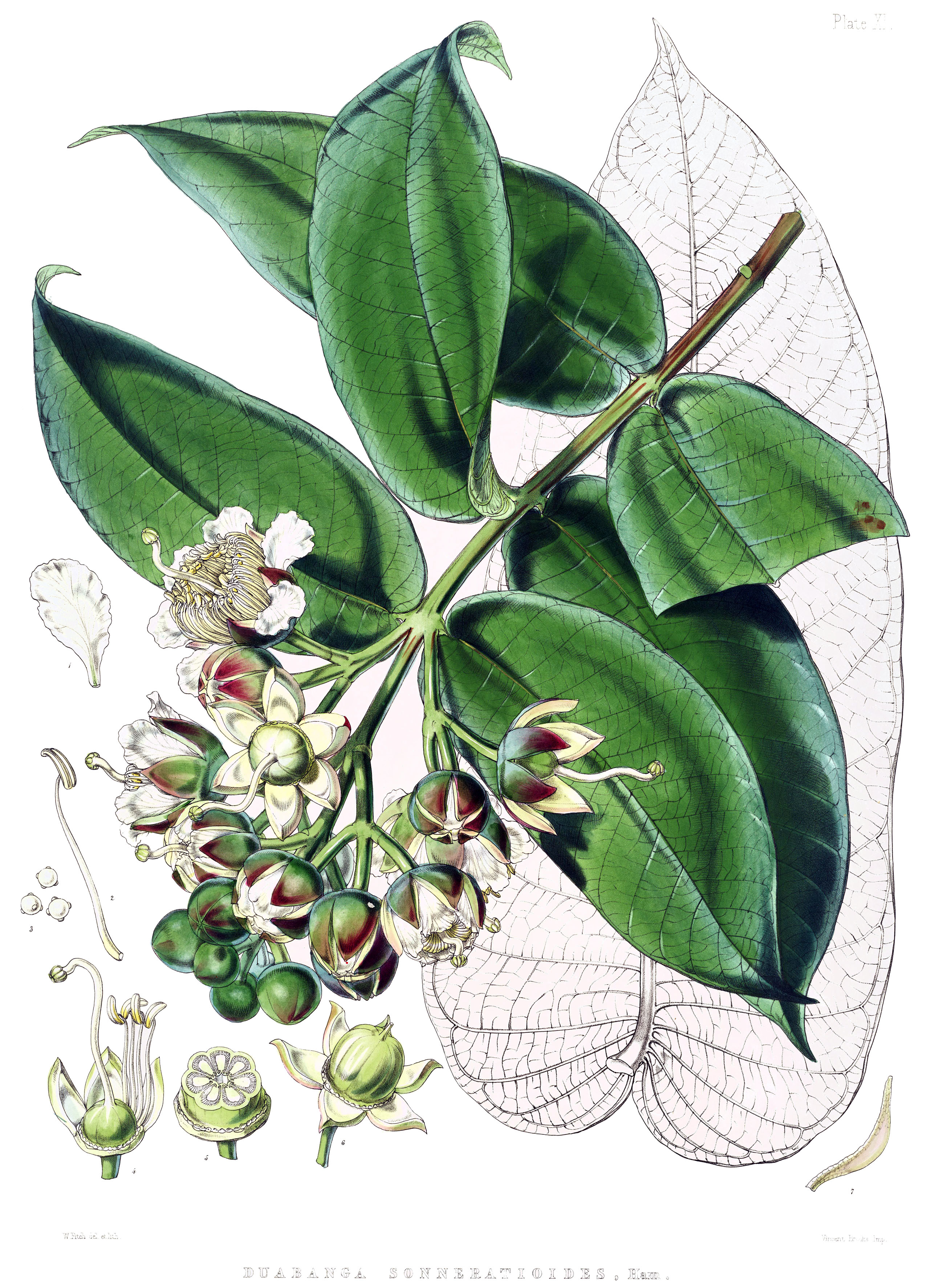
- Duabanga grandiflora

Scientific classification
- Kingdom: Plantae
- Clade: Embryophytes
- Clade: Tracheophytes
- Clade: Spermatophytes
- Clade: Angiosperms
- Clade: Eudicots
- Clade: Rosids
- Order: Myrtales
- Family: Lythraceae
- Subfamily: Duabangoideae (Takht.) S. A. Graham, Thorne & Reveal
- Genus: Duabanga; Buch.-Ham.

Species
- Duabanga grandiflora (Roxb. ex DC.) Walpers; Duabanga moluccana Blume; Duabanga taylorii Jayaweera

= Duabanga =

Genus of flowering plants

Duabanga is a small genus of lowland evergreen rainforest trees in southeast Asia, with two or three species. Duabanga was traditionally included in the ditypic family Sonneratiaceae, but it is now classified in its own monotypic subfamily Duabangoideae of the Lythraceae. The genus name was given by Francis Buchanan-Hamilton based on a local name, duyabangga, in use in Tripura.

A fossil from the Deccan Traps of Kutch has been placed in the genus Duabangoxylon and is considered to be closely related to extant Duabanga species.

Species in the genus are large trees that grow in moist tropical forest areas from the Himalayas through Southeast Asia to New Guinea. The species include:

- D. moluccana - Java, Borneo, Celebes, Moluccas, New Guinea, Talaud, Lesser Sunda, Philippines
- D. grandiflora - Northeast India, Andamans, Myanmar, Thailand, Cambodia, Malaysia, Vietnam and parts of China
- D. taylorii - from Java
