= Duabanga moluccana =

Scientific classification
- Kingdom: Plantae
- Clade: Tracheophytes
- Clade: Angiosperms
- Clade: Eudicots
- Clade: Rosids
- Order: Myrtales
- Family: Lythraceae
- Genus: Duabanga
- Species: D. moluccana

Binomial name
- Duabanga moluccana Blume

Species of flowering plant

Duabanga moluccana is a species of tree native to Indonesia and surrounding areas. Its common names include kalanggo (Indonesia) loktob (Philippines) and magas (Malaysia).
