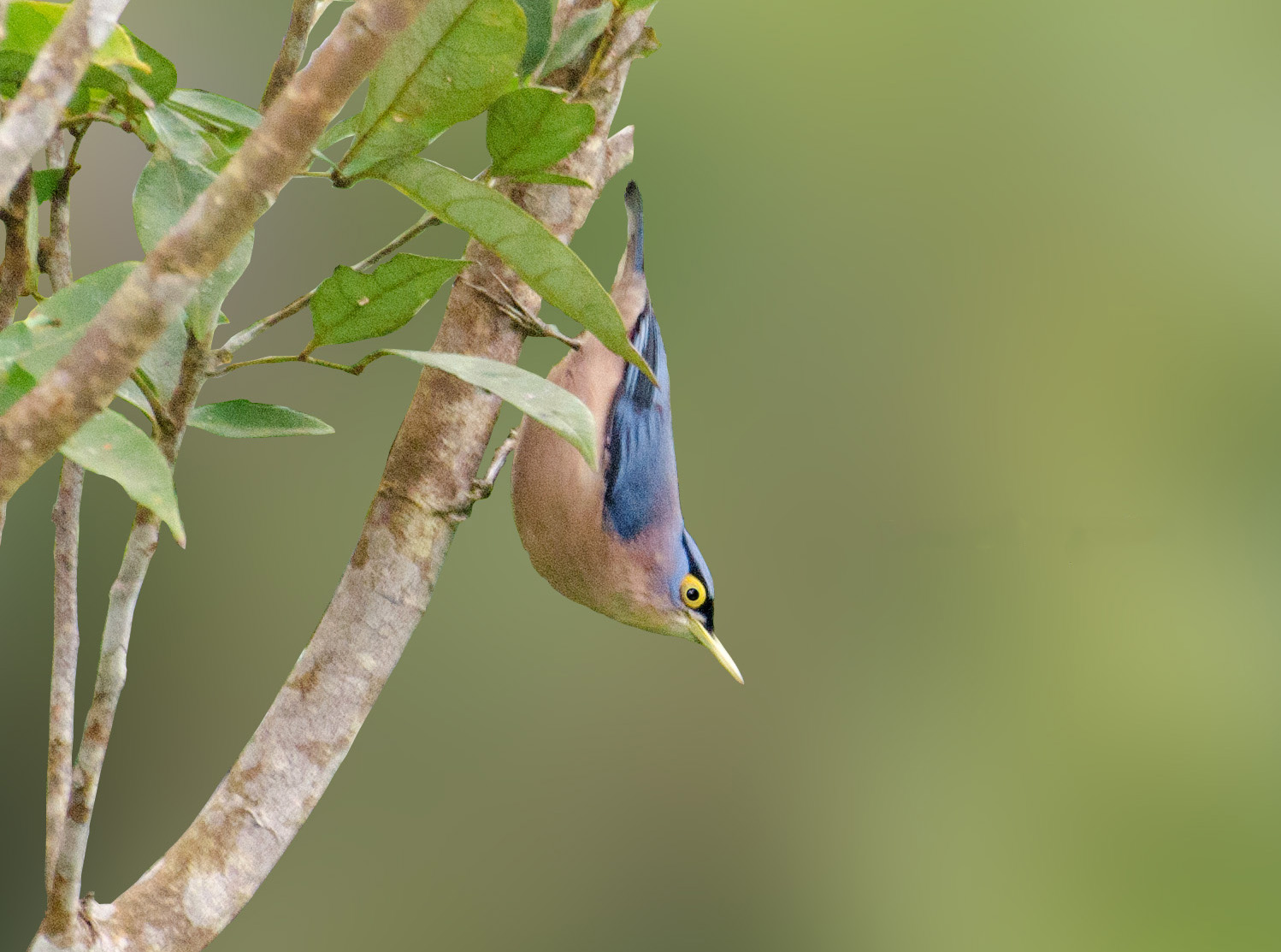

Conservation status
- Least Concern (IUCN 3.1)

Scientific classification
- Kingdom: Animalia
- Phylum: Chordata
- Class: Aves
- Order: Passeriformes
- Family: Sittidae
- Genus: Sitta
- Species: S. oenochlamys

Binomial name
- Sitta oenochlamys (Sharpe, 1877)

= Sulphur-billed nuthatch =

Species of bird

The sulphur-billed nuthatch (Sitta oenochlamys) is a species of bird in the family Sittidae. It is endemic to the Philippines. Its natural habitats are tropical moist lowland forest and tropical moist montane forest. It is commonly found in mixed flocks along with Blue-headed fantails, sunbirds, flowerpeckers and other small forest birds.

== Description and taxonomy ==
=== Subspecies ===
Six subspecies are accepted:

- Sitta oenochlamys oenochlamys — Panay, Guimaras, Negros and Cebu
- Sitta oenochlamys mesoleuca — Northwest Luzon around the Cordillera Mountain Range
- Sitta oenochlamys isarog — Luzon except the Northwest
- Sitta oenochlamys lilacea — Samar, Leyte, Biliran,
- Sitta oenochlamys apo — Mindanao except for the Zamboanga Peninsula
- Sitta oenochlamys zamboanga — Zamboanga Peninsula, and Basilan

== Ecology and behavior ==
Feeds on insects. Found singly, in pairs, in flocks of up to 20 individuals and also joins mixed species flocks. It is very active and forages near the canopy, it is often seen on trunks where its gleans loose bark, moss or epiphytes.

Birds have been collected in breeding condition with enlarged gonads in January to May. Not much else is known.

== Habitat and conservation status ==
Its natural habitats at tropical moist lowland and montane primary forest and secondary forest up to 2,060 meters above sea level. It is more common in higher elevations.

The IUCN Red List has assessed this bird as least-concern species as it is still common throughout its large range. The population is decreasing due to the habitat loss and deforestation in the Philippines. More studies are recommended to better understand this species, population and conservation status.
