= Pacific monarch =

Pacific monarch may refer to:

- Pale-blue monarch, a species of flycatcher found in the Solomon Islands
- Buff-bellied monarch, a species of flycatcher found in Indonesia
