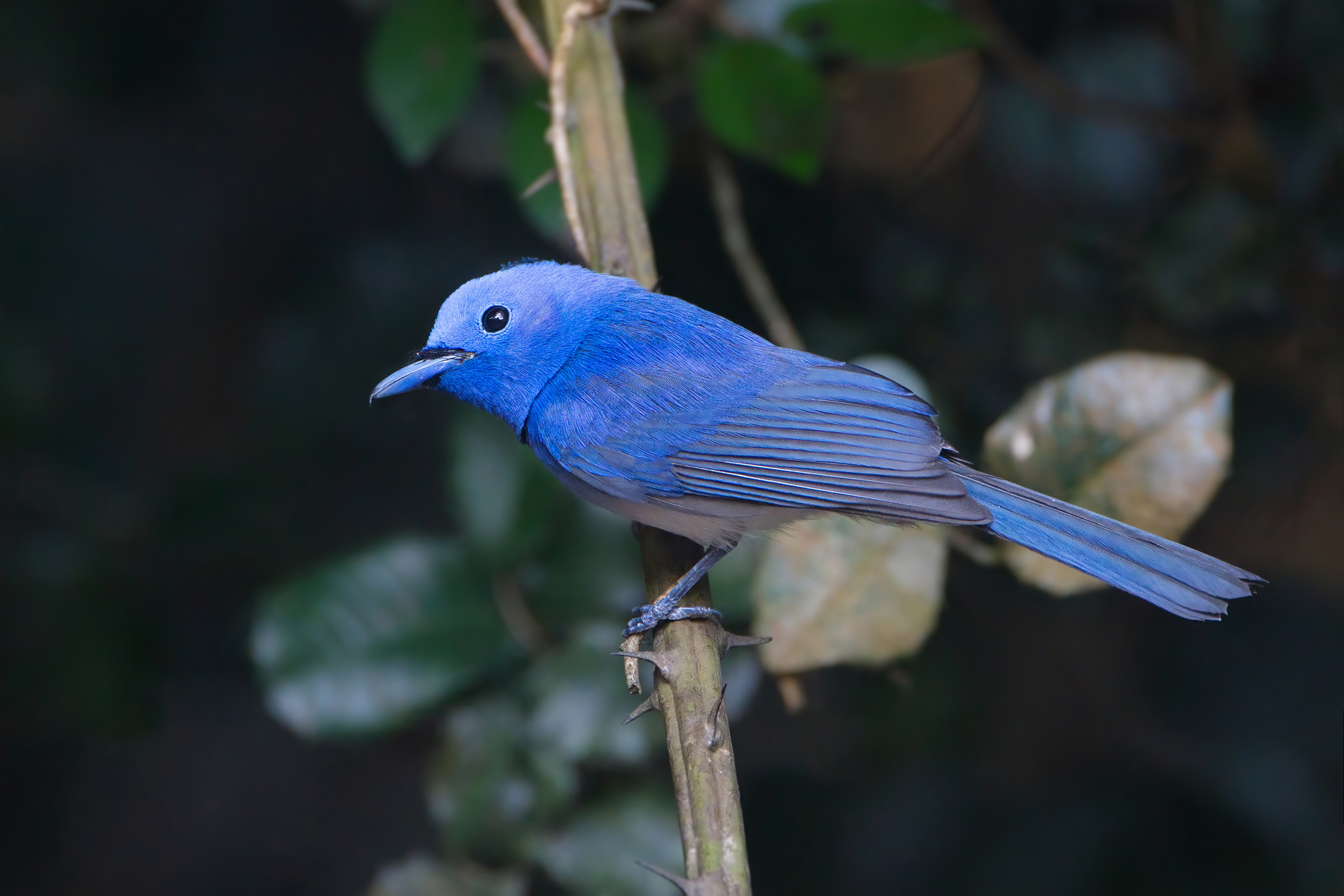
- A male (H. a. montana) from Kaeng Krachan in Thailand
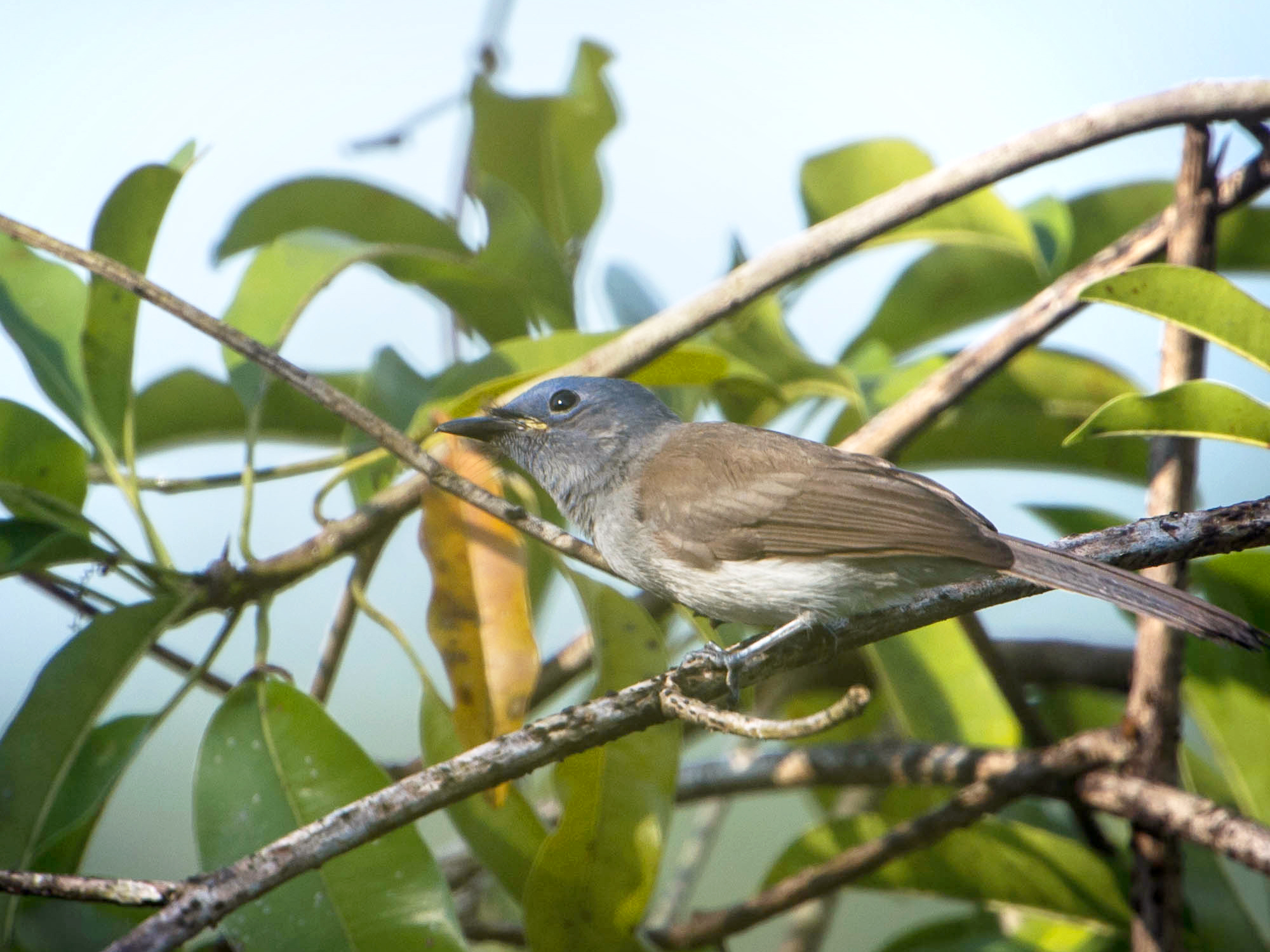
- H. a. montana female

Conservation status
- Least Concern (IUCN 3.1)

Scientific classification
- Kingdom: Animalia
- Phylum: Chordata
- Class: Aves
- Order: Passeriformes
- Family: Monarchidae
- Genus: Hypothymis
- Species: H. azurea

Binomial name
- Hypothymis azurea (Boddaert, 1783)

Subspecies
- See text
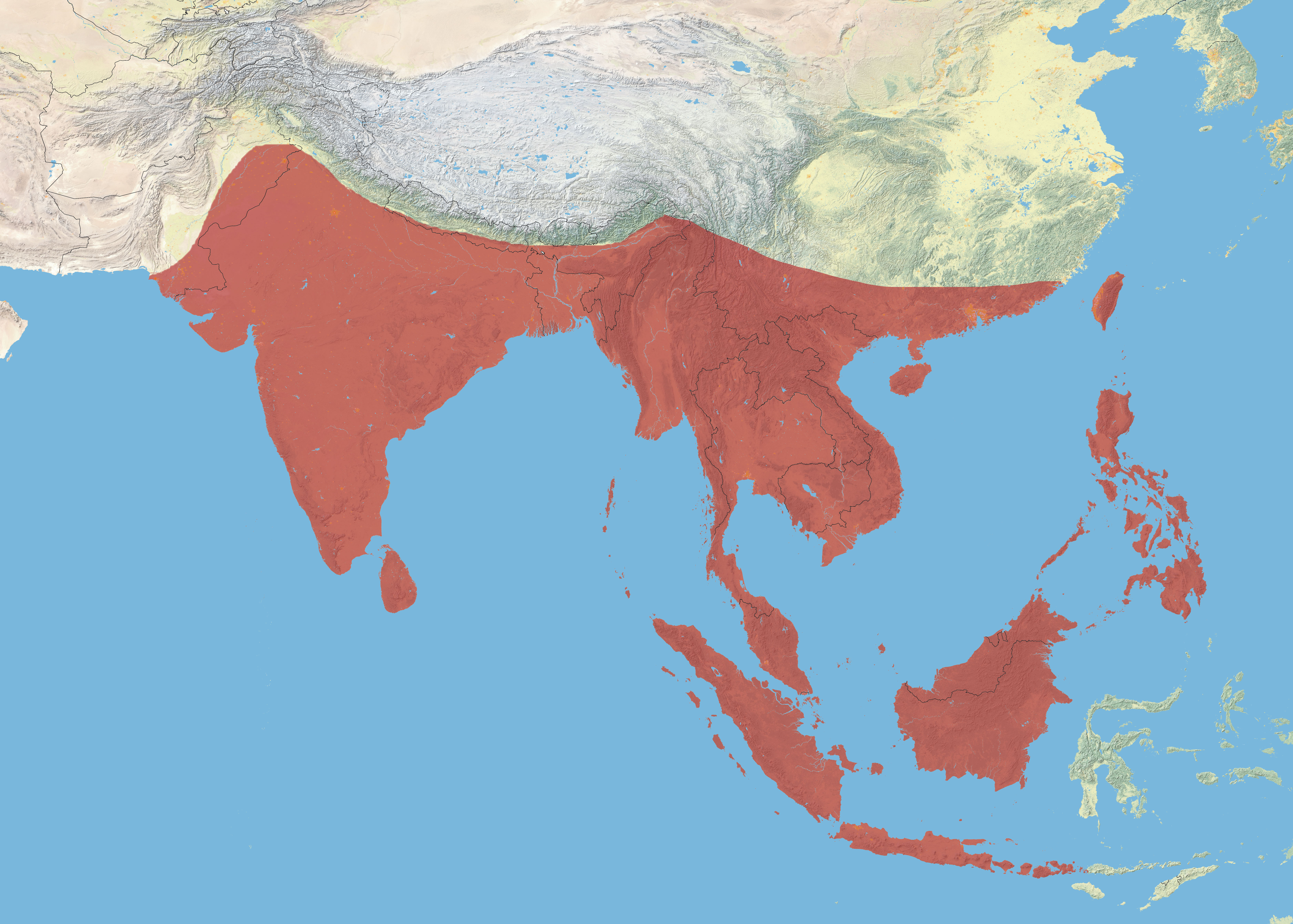
- approximate distribution

Synonyms
- Monarcha azurea; Muscicapa azurea

= Black-naped monarch =

Species of bird

The black-naped monarch (Hypothymis azurea) is a passerine bird belonging to the family of monarch flycatchers found in southern and south-eastern Asia. They are sexually dimorphic, with the male having a distinctive black patch on the back of the head and a narrow black half collar ("necklace"), while the female is duller with olive brown wings and lacking the black markings on the head. They have a call that is similar to that of the Asian paradise flycatcher, and in tropical forest habitats, pairs may join mixed-species foraging flocks. Populations differ slightly in plumage colour and sizes.

== Taxonomy ==
The black-naped monarch was described by the French polymath Georges-Louis Leclerc, Comte de Buffon in 1779 in his Histoire Naturelle des Oiseaux. The bird was also illustrated in a hand-coloured plate engraved by François-Nicolas Martinet in the Planches Enluminées D'Histoire Naturelle which was produced under the supervision of Edme-Louis Daubenton to accompany Buffon's text. Neither the plate caption nor Buffon's description included a scientific name but in 1783 the Dutch naturalist Pieter Boddaert coined the binomial name Muscicapa azurea in his catalogue of the Planches Enluminées. Buffon specified that his specimen had been collected in the Philippines, and in 1939 the American ornithologist James L. Peters restricted the type locality to Manila on the island of Luzon. The black-naped monarch is now placed in the genus Hypothymis was introduced by the German zoologist Friedrich Boie in 1826 with the black-naped monarch as the type species. The genus name is from the Ancient Greek hupothumis, the name of an unidentified bird mentioned by the playwright Aristophanes. The specific epithet azurea is from the Medieval Latin azureus meaning "azure-coloured" or "azure-blue".

Alternate names for the black-naped monarch include black-naped blue monarch and black-naped monarch flycatcher. Some authorities separate two former subspecies, H. a. blasii (Banggai Island) and H. a. puella (Sulawesi), and place them as subspecies of the pale-blue monarch (Hypothymis puella).

=== Subspecies ===
Twenty-three subspecies are recognized:

- H. a. styani – (Hartlaub, 1899): Originally described as a separate species in the genus Ficedula, found from India and Nepal to southeast China and Vietnam. The abdomen is whitish in males.
- H. a. oberholseri – Stresemann, 1913: Found in Taiwan
- H. a. ceylonensis – Sharpe, 1879: Originally described as a separate species, found in Sri Lanka. The males lack the black necklace.
- H. a. tytleri – (Beavan, 1867): Originally described as a separate species in the genus Myiagra. Found in the Andaman Islands. The abdomen of males is blue.
- H. a. idiochroa – Oberholser, 1911: Found on Car Nicobar (northern Nicobar Islands). The abdomen of males is white tinged with blue.
- H. a. nicobarica – Bianchi, 1907: Found on southern Nicobar Islands. The abdomen of males is white tinged with blue.
- H. a. montana – Riley, 1929: Found in northern and central Thailand
- H. a. galerita – (Deignan, 1956), 1929: Found in southwest and southeast Thailand
- H. a. forrestia – Oberholser, 1911: Found in Mergui Archipelago (off western Myanmar)
- H. a. prophata – Oberholser, 1911: Found on Malay Peninsula, Sumatra and Borneo
- H. a. javana – Chasen & Kloss, 1929: Found on Java and Bali (Indonesia)
- H. a. penidae – Meise, 1942: Found on Nusa Penida (near Bali in the Lesser Sundas)
- H. a. karimatensis – Chasen & Kloss, 1932: Found on Karimata Island (off western Borneo)
- H. a. opisthocyanea – Oberholser, 1911: Found on Anambas Islands (in the South China Sea)
- H. a. gigantoptera – Oberholser, 1911: Found on Natuna Besar (Natuna Islands, South China Sea)
- H. a. consobrina – Richmond, 1902: Originally described as a separate species, found on Simeulue (off north-western Sumatra)
- H. a. leucophila – Oberholser, 1911: Found on Siberut (off western Sumatra)
- H. a. richmondi – Oberholser, 1911: Found on Enggano Island (off south-western Sumatra)
- H. a. abbotti – Richmond, 1902: Originally described as a separate species, found on Reusam and Babi Islands (off north-western Sumatra)
- H. a. symmixta – Stresemann, 1913: Found on western and central Lesser Sundas
- H. a. azurea (Philippine black-naped monarch) – (Boddaert, 1783): Also known as the black-capped monarch and Philippine black-naped blue monarch. Found in Philippines (except Camiguin Sur Island)
- H. a. aeria – Bangs & Peters, JL, 1927: Originally described as a separate species, found on Maratua Island (off eastern Borneo)
- H. a. catarmanensis – Rand & Rabor, 1969: Found on Camiguin Sur Island (southern Philippines)

== Description ==
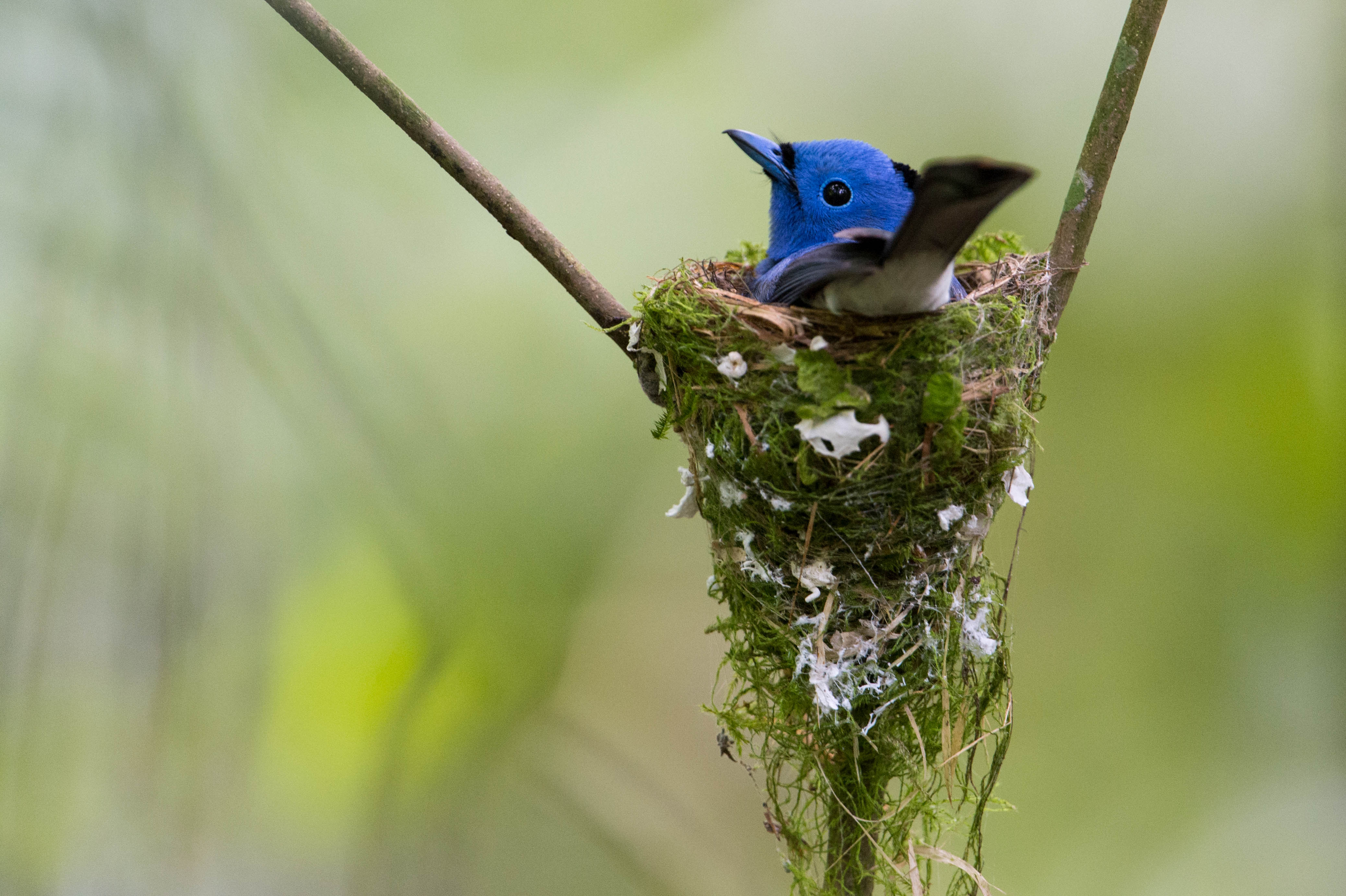
H. a. montana at nest in Thailand

Adult male. Cebu, Philippines

The adult male black-naped monarch is about 16 cm long, and is mainly pale azure blue apart from a whitish lower belly. It has a black nape and a narrow black gorget. The female is duller and lacks the black markings. Its wings and back are grey-brown. However, several geographically separated breeding populations differ in the extent and shade of markings. The Indian peninsula has subspecies H. a. styani (which subsumes H. a. sykesi of Stuart Baker), in which males have very distinct black markings and a whitish abdomen. Males of the Sri Lankan race H. a. ceylonensis lack the black nape and gorget and the shade is more purplish. The subspecies of the Andaman Islands, H. a. tytleri, has the underparts blue grey. The form on Car Nicobar Island, H. a. idiochroa, has a greyish white belly, while H. a. nicobarica from the southern Nicobars has a smaller and finer bill. The colour of the gape is yellowish to green.

The black-naped monarch's calls are a sharp and abrupt skrip.

== Distribution and habitat ==
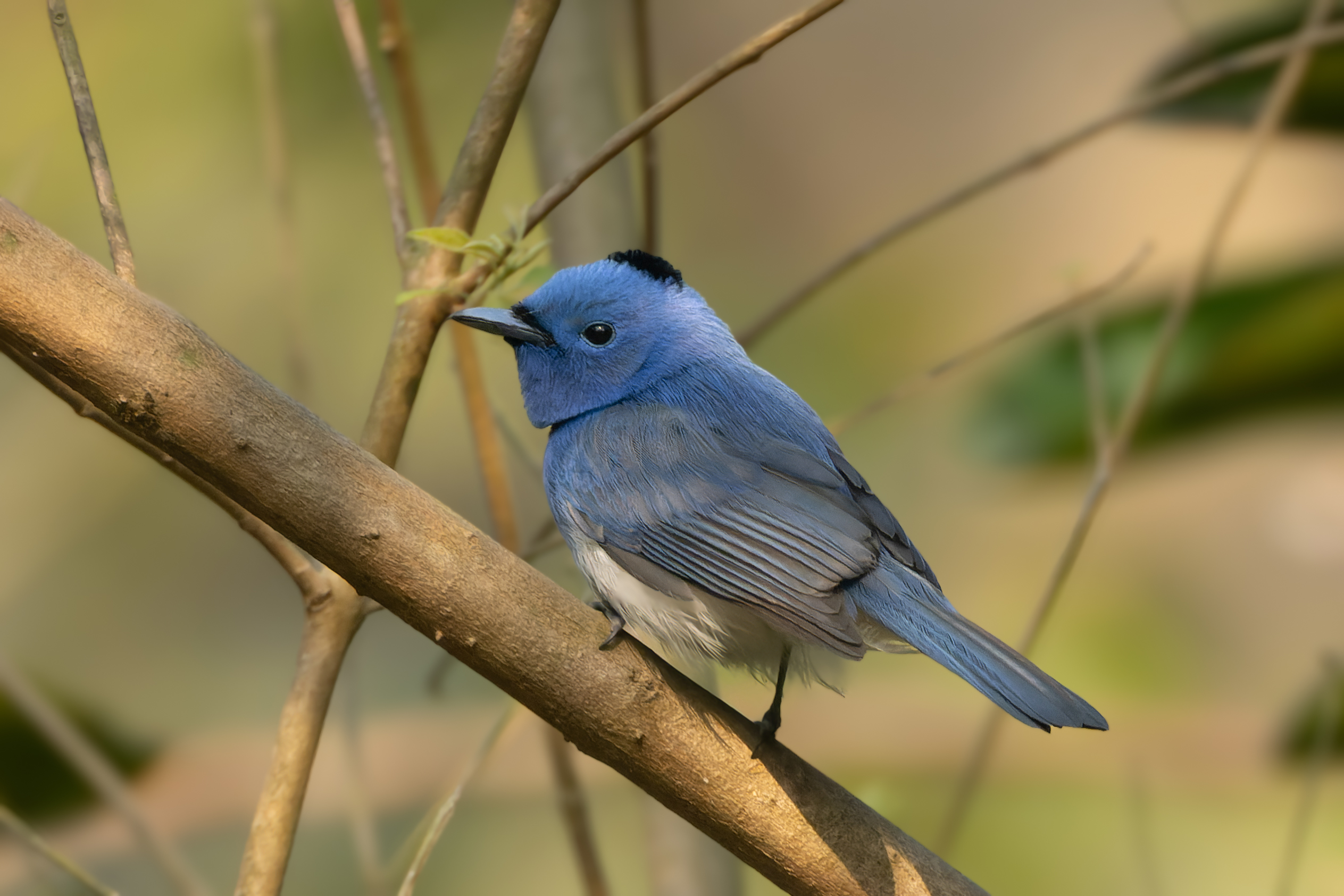
Black-naped Monarch (Hypothymis azurea) male in Rabindra Sarobar, West Bengal, India.

The black-naped monarch breeds across tropical southern Asia from Iran and Sri Lanka east to Indonesia and the Philippines. This species is usually found in thick forests and other well-wooded habitats.

The main breeding season in India is in summer from May to July. Two to three eggs are laid in a cup nest placed in the fork of a tree. The nest is decorated with spider-egg cases.

== Behaviour and ecology ==
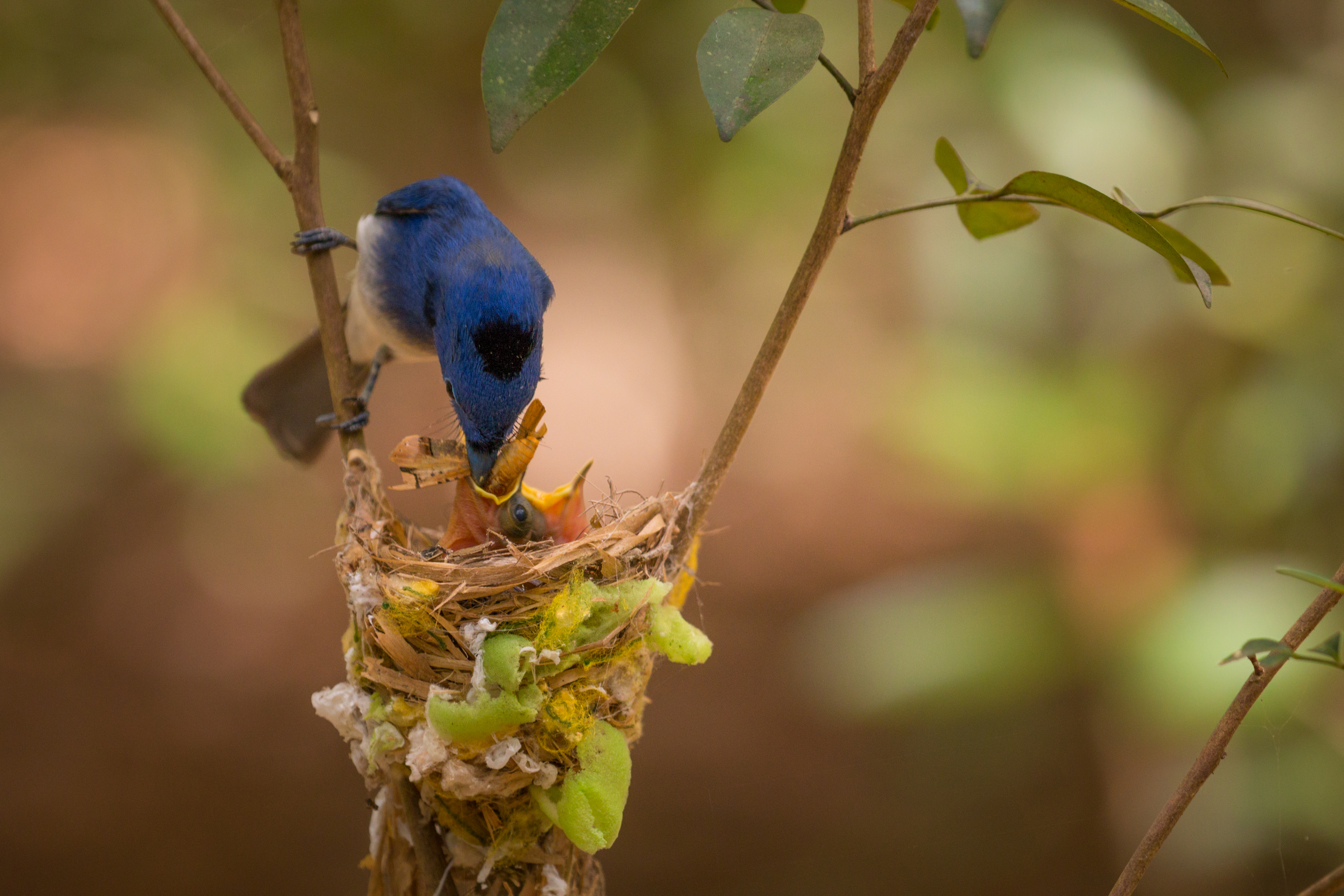
Black-naped monarch feeding its nestlings at Wilpattu national park – Sri Lanka

The black-naped monarch has short legs and sits very upright whilst perched prominently, like a shrike. It is insectivorous, often hunting by flycatching. When alarmed or alert, the nape feathers are raised into a pointed crest. They join mixed-species foraging flocks, being among the most significant members of such flocks in the Western Ghats, and are active in the understory of forest canopies. A study in Sri Lanka showed that they are affected by human disturbance causing them to recede from disturbed edges by about 75 m.

Although they are largely residents, local seasonal movements are known. The breeding season in India is March to August and the nest is a neat cup placed in a fork. The cup is lined with filaments of webbing and fungi including those of the genus Marasmius which are known to produce antibiotics and may benefit the birds by protecting the young from infection. The nest is built by the female while the male guards. The typical clutch is three eggs, which both parents incubate and both feed the young, which hatch after about 12 days.

The webs of large spiders, such as Nephila maculata, have been known to trap the bird. An astrovirus was detected in a black-naped monarch in Cambodia, a virus that was earlier unknown from passerines. The feather mite Proterothrix hypothymis (Pterodectinae: Protophyllodidae) has been described from black-naped monarchs in Vietnam.

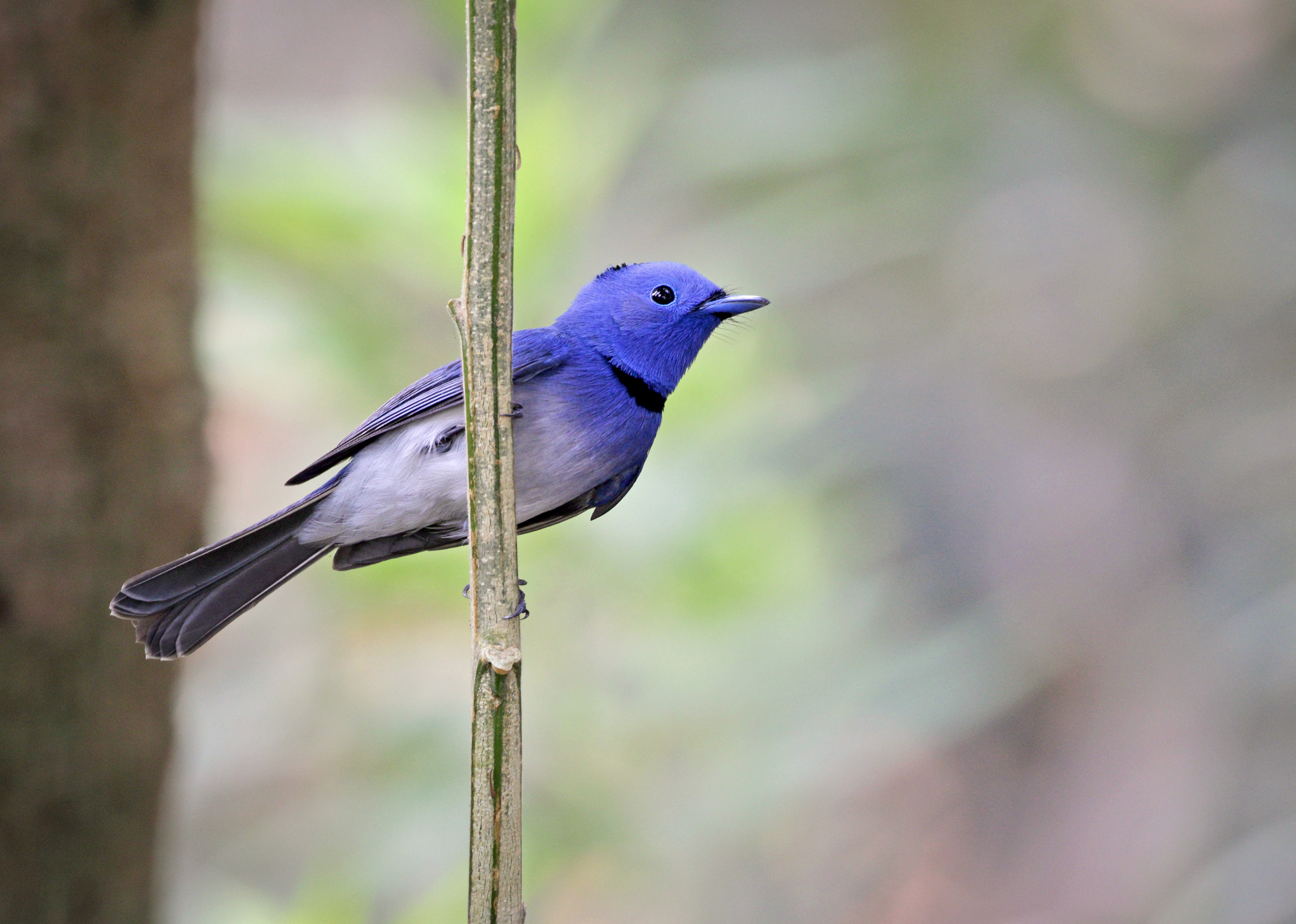
Male

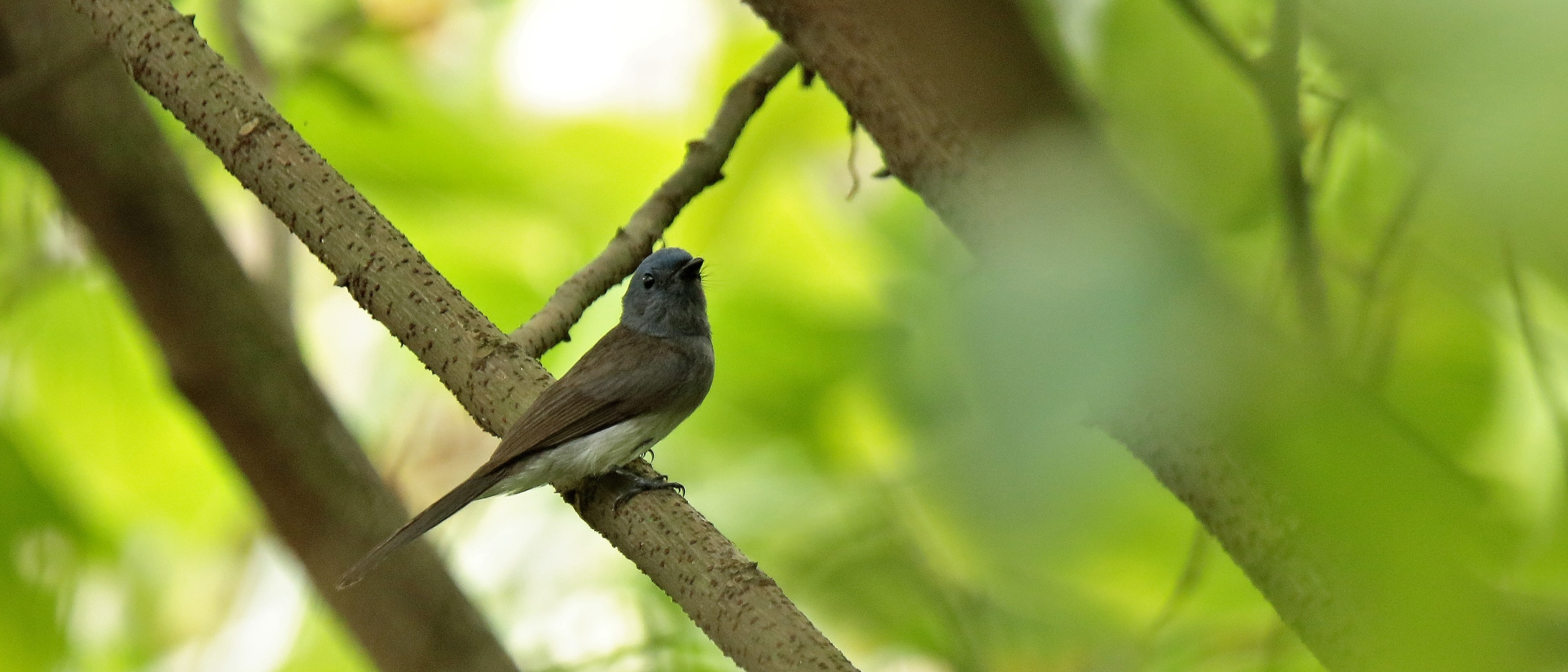
Female
