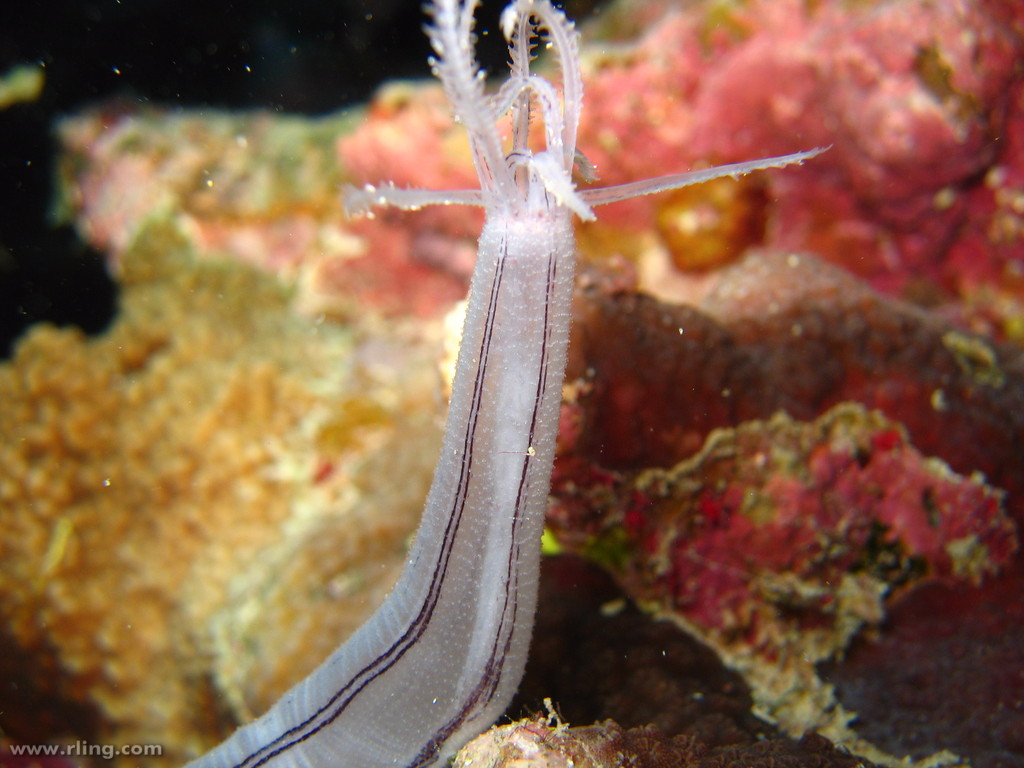

Scientific classification
- Kingdom: Animalia
- Phylum: Echinodermata
- Class: Holothuroidea
- Order: Apodida
- Family: Synaptidae
- Genus: Synaptula
- Species: S. lamperti

Binomial name
- Synaptula lamperti Heding, 1928

= Synaptula lamperti =

Species of echinoderm

Synaptula lamperti is a species of sea cucumber in the family Synaptidae in the phylum Echinodermata, found on coral reefs in the Indo-Pacific region. The echinoderms are marine invertebrates and include the sea urchins, starfish and sea cucumbers. They are radially symmetric and have a water vascular system that operates by hydrostatic pressure, enabling them to move around by use of many suckers known as tube feet. Sea cucumbers are usually leathery, gherkin-shaped animals with a cluster of short tentacles at one end. They live on the sea bottom.

== Description ==
S. lamperti has an elongated, opaque body with several dark-coloured, longitudinal stripes. There are no tube feet on the body but a few have been modified into a tuft of pinnate feeding tentacles which are constantly in motion. The skeletal system consists of small calcareous plates which are embedded in the cuticle. These ossicles consist of little hooks that protrude through the skin and make the animal seem sticky. It moves around rapidly and efficiently using the hooks at one end of its body for adhesion while muscular contractions and hydrostatic pressure changes alter the position of the other end.

The genus Synaptula comprises some thirty very similar species, and identification as Synaptula lamperti is often wrongly attributed to all species observed by amateurs. However, the coloration patterns formerly used to distinguish these species (notably by Heding, 1928) is no more considered reliable, and the number of synonymies of visually distinct species, notably with Synaptula lamperti, should call for the greatest caution, apart from any verification by dermal spicules.

== Distribution ==
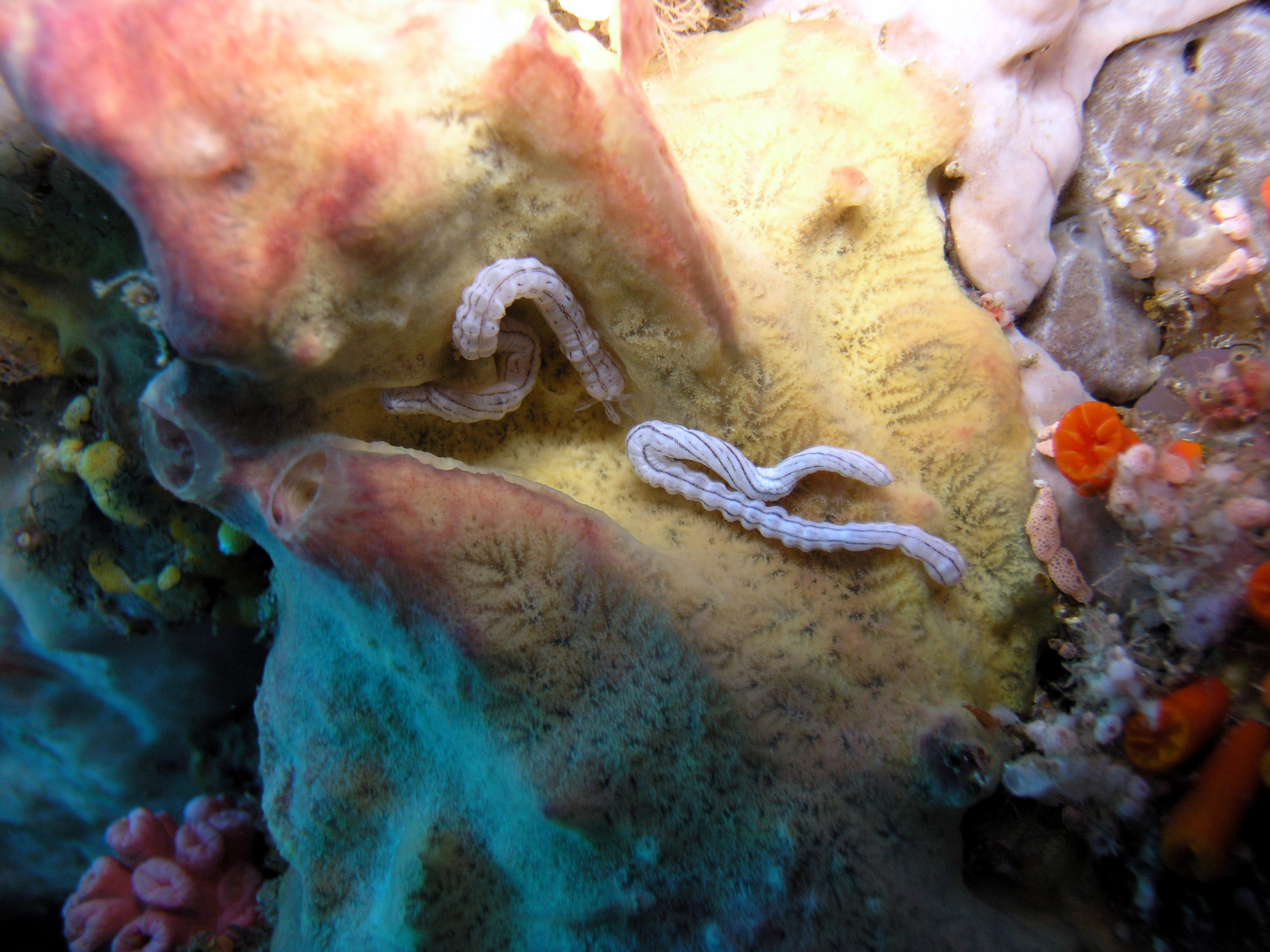
Synaptula lamperti

S. lamperti is found in the Western Pacific including the coasts of Indonesia, Papua New Guinea, Micronesia and the Philippines.

== Biology ==
S. lamperti is very common on coral reefs, both on the exposed and the inner slopes. It is a detrivore that specifically feeds on or around living sponges of the Ianthella basta species. Synaptula lamperti often remains firmly attached to the surface of its sponge host, sometimes for extended periods, rather than moving across the substrate, indicating a sessile-oriented feeding strategy on the sponge surface.It appears to require the nutrients provided by this particular sponge to thrive, as it ingests microscopic organic particles such as diatoms and also substances exuded from the surface of its host sponge. It feeds only at night, and food is processed rapidly, with a passage time through the digestive tract of under an hour.

Most individuals of S. lamperti are either male or female, but hermaphrodites occasionally occur and self-fertilisation may take place. The closely related species Synaptula hydriformis has been studied in detail and its fertilised eggs are retained in the coelom where the juveniles develop in a safe protected environment. If S. lamperti becomes damaged, both the anterior and the posterior portions can regenerate into new individuals.
