= Synaptula spinifera =

Scientific classification
- Kingdom: Animalia
- Phylum: Echinodermata
- Class: Holothuroidea
- Order: Apodida
- Family: Synaptidae
- Genus: Synaptula
- Species: S. spinifera

Binomial name
- Synaptula spinifera Massin & Tomascik, 1996

Species of sea cucumber

Synaptula spinifera is a species of sea cucumber from the family Synaptidae, the worm-like sea cucumbers. The species was first described from the anchialine lagoon of Kakaban island, part of Indonesia's Derawan Islands, and is thought to be endemic to that waterbody.

== Description ==
S. spinifera is a small species of holothurian, with the biggest of the preserved specimens being 85 millimetres (3.3 in) long and 8 millimetres (0.31 in) in diameter. In life, they are various hues of brown-red with white-colored very fine longitudinal lines and small dots. There are 13 tentacles on its anterior end, each possessing 18 to 22 digitations which are united by a web. Akin to other members of its order, these tentacles are used for feeding, and this species is primarily a suspension feeder.

Within its body, a "very large" or prominent cartilagenous ring encloses the white calcareous ring. The species' ossicles have a few forms, being anchors, anchor-plates, and miliary granules, though the granules are often absent. Ossicles are spread throughout the body wall but are absent in the tentacles. The specific name spinifera refers to the long spine on the bridge of the anchor-plate.

== Habitat ==
Synaptula spinifera inhabits the lagoon of Kakaban Island, which is completely encircled by a densely vegetated limestone ridge; being anchialine, its only connection to the sea is through submarine connections through the porous carbonate rock and small fissures. Prehistorically an atoll, the island was uplifted 40–60 metres (130–200 ft) above today's sea level, which isolated the lagoon's ecosystem. The salinity of the lagoon is lower than that of seawater, being 26-28 psu (physical salinity units). Echinoderms and especially holothurians appear to be sensitive to low salinities, so it is proposed that the species currently inhabiting the lagoon gradually adapted to the changing conditions after it was uplifted, and are the remnants of an initially more diverse fauna.

This holothurian species is found throughout the 1.5 by 2.6 kilometres (0.93 mi × 1.62 mi) lagoon, often being found between the thalli of the dominant Halimeda algae or upon Enteromorpha clathrata which often grows on the Halimeda. S. spinifera is found at depths of between 0.25 to 8 metres (9.8 in to 26 ft 3.0 in), with a density of 20-34 individuals per m² in the Halimeda "meadows". The species may also live on the roots of Rhizophora mangroves that fringe the lagoon, which are often overgrown with epiphytic algae and invertebrates, such as encrusting sponges.

Extensive surveys of the outer reef of Kakaban atoll, part of the surrounding marine ecosystem, have failed to find Synaptula spinifera, suggesting that it is endemic to the isolated lagoon within Kakaban.
