= Kakaban =

Island in Indonesia

Kakaban Island
Native name: Pulau Kakaban (Indonesian)
- Interactive map of Kakaban Island

Geography
- Location: South East Asia
- Coordinates: 2°08′42″N 118°32′09″E
- Archipelago: Derawan

Administration
- Indonesia
- Regency: Maratua

Demographics
- Population: Uninhabited

Kakaban island (also known as Samama island) is a member of the Derawan archipelago, East Kalimantan, Indonesia. The island has an area of 774.2 hectares (1,913 acres) and is quite steep. Its limestone cliffs are covered with dense jungle right down to the water's edge. The wall drops to 180 metres (590 ft), and currents can be strong with upwelling, downcurrent, and reversing directions.

Its most distinctive feature is the huge brackish water lake in the middle of the island; in the local dialect Kakaban means "hug" as the island "hugs" the lake from the surrounding seawater. This marine lake houses an ecosystem isolated from the surrounding sea, and a number of endemic species are found here.

== Geology ==
Kakaban is an uplifted coral atoll which was raised relatively recently, around the Late Pleistocene-Holocene.

== Landmarks ==
=== Barracuda Point ===
This is a steep "wall" (reef drop off), where the current brings large pelagics like whitetip sharks, leopard sharks, jacks, tunas, snapper and barracuda. Drift diving can be done with the help of a grab line permanently secured 24 metres (79 ft) across a relatively flat area on the upcurrent side of the point. Currents can be fierce with down currents.

=== Blue Light Cave ===
The cave starts at a crack at 2 metres (6 ft 7 in) deep and descends through a narrow chimney. At about 21 metres (69 ft) the chimney opens into a large cavern that extends for about 120 metres (390 ft). The exit is a long vertical crack in the wall at 44 metres (144 ft). The name of the cave comes from the blue light of the sea which is seen from the cavern.

=== Jellyfish Lake ===
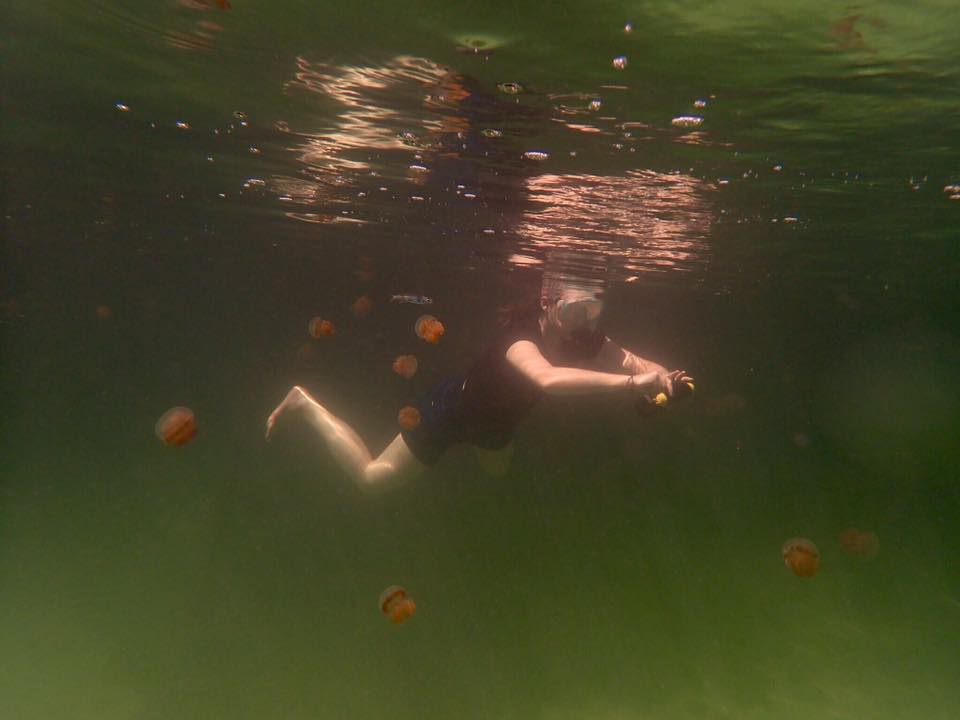
Snorkeling among the Mastigias jellyfish in the lake

In the middle of this island is a mangrove-fringed marine lake, slightly above sea level, which is 17 metres (56 ft) deep at most with poor visibility; Kakaban was probably uplifted sometime during the Holocene era which trapped the seawater within, forming a landlocked marine lake (though technically it is anchialine, connected to the ocean through the porous and cracked rock). The water is now brackish, being a mixture of saltwater and fresh water from rainfall. The lake is around a 10-minute walk from the beach.

The lake is dominated by meadows of Halimeda algae, and is also home to thousands of jellyfish, making it interesting for diving. The jellyfish consist of four different species, all of which do not have the ability to harm humans with their stinging cells. They are Aurelia sp. with a transparent body, Tripedalia cystophora which is fingertip size, Mastigias cf. papua is similar to Palau's golden jellyfish, and Cassiopea ornata which is an upside-down jellyfish with upright tentacles. Although they cannot sting humans, they still have poison and can sting their prey. Similar lakes exist in the Philippines (Siargao), and in Palau, with Jellyfish Lake being the best known.

Other animals within the lake include the endemic Synaptula spinifera and Holothuria (Lessonothuria) cavans sea cucumbers, other echinoderms such as Aquilonastra seastars and Ophiarachnella brittle stars, fish such as Exyrias puntang gobies, Fibramia lateralis cardinalfish, and Zenarchopterus dispar halfbeaks; sea anemones similar to Entacmaea medusivora, endemic Styela complexa tunicates, crustaceans (including an endemic crab), nudibranchs, flatworms, and snakes.

The surrounding jungle is inhabited by various birds, water monitors, and snakes.
