= Maratua Airport =

Maratua Airport Bandar Udara Maratua
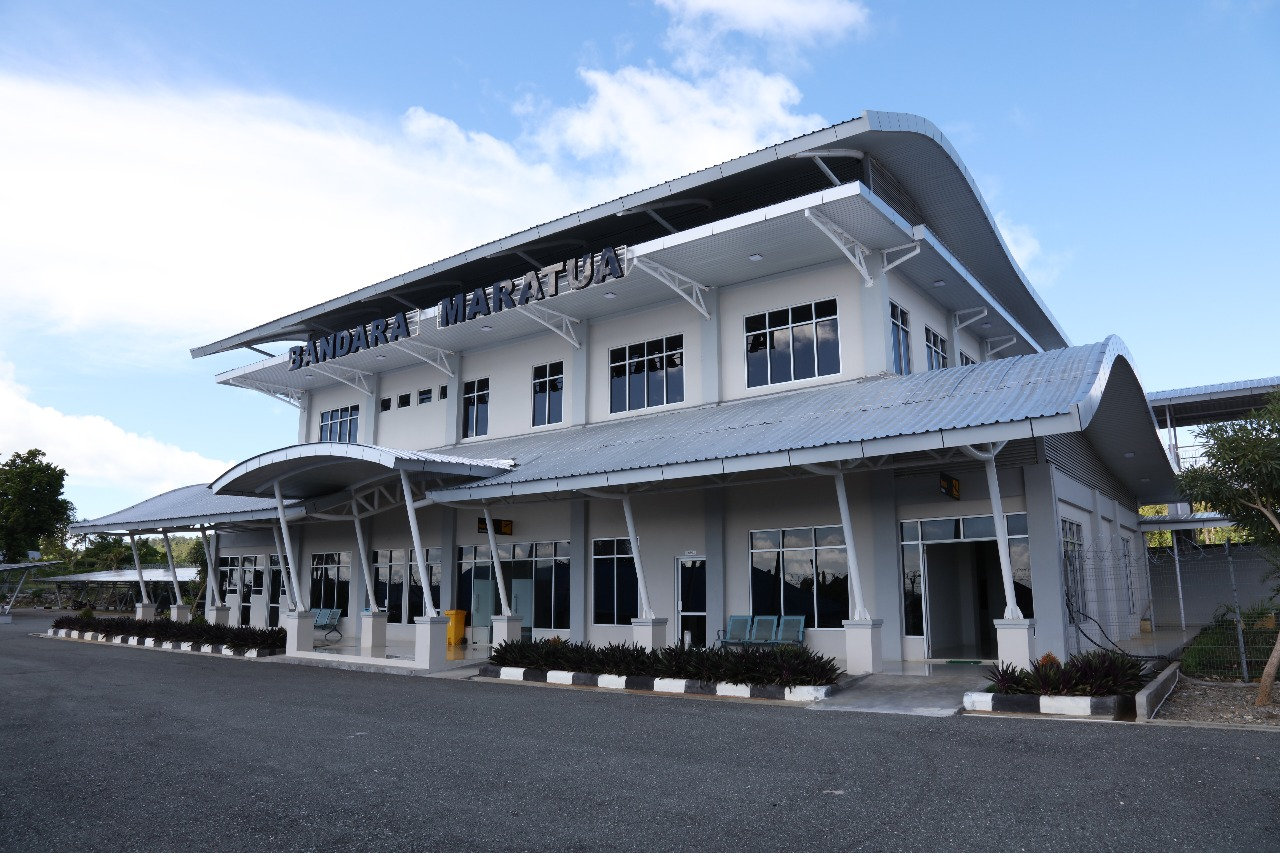
- IATA: RTU; ICAO: WAQC

Summary
- Airport type: Public
- Owner: Government of Indonesia
- Operator: Directorate General of Civil Aviation
- Serves: Maratua Island
- Location: Payung-payung, Maratua District, Berau Regency, East Kalimantan, Indonesia
- Time zone: WITA (UTC+08:00)
- Elevation AMSL: 59 ft (18 m)
- Coordinates: 02°11′51″N 118°35′57″E

Map
- Location in Kalimantan

Runways
Direction	Length		Surface
Direction	m	ft	Surface
01/19	1,600	5,250	Asphalt

Statistics (2024)
- Passengers: 5,977 (▲44.2%)
- Cargo (tonnes): 0.15 (▲650.0%)
- Aircraft movements: 647 (▲44.1%)
- Source: DGCA

Maratua Airport (IATA: RTU, ICAO: WAQC) is a domestic regional airport located on Maratua Island in Berau Regency, East Kalimantan, Indonesia. The airport is situated approximately 6.7 km (4.2 miles) from the Maratua District Office and serves as the main gateway by air to the Maratua Islands and the wider Derawan Islands archipelago, a major biodiversity area renowned for its snorkeling and coral reef ecosystems. The airport currently serves only interprovincial routes within the region, including flights to Samarinda, the provincial capital of East Kalimantan, and Tanjung Redeb, the administrative seat of Berau Regency, both operated by Smart Aviation, as well as flights to Tarakan in North Kalimantan operated by Susi Air. The airport previously had a direct service to Balikpapan operated by Wings Air and TransNusa, but the route has since been discontinued.

== History ==
=== Background and construction ===
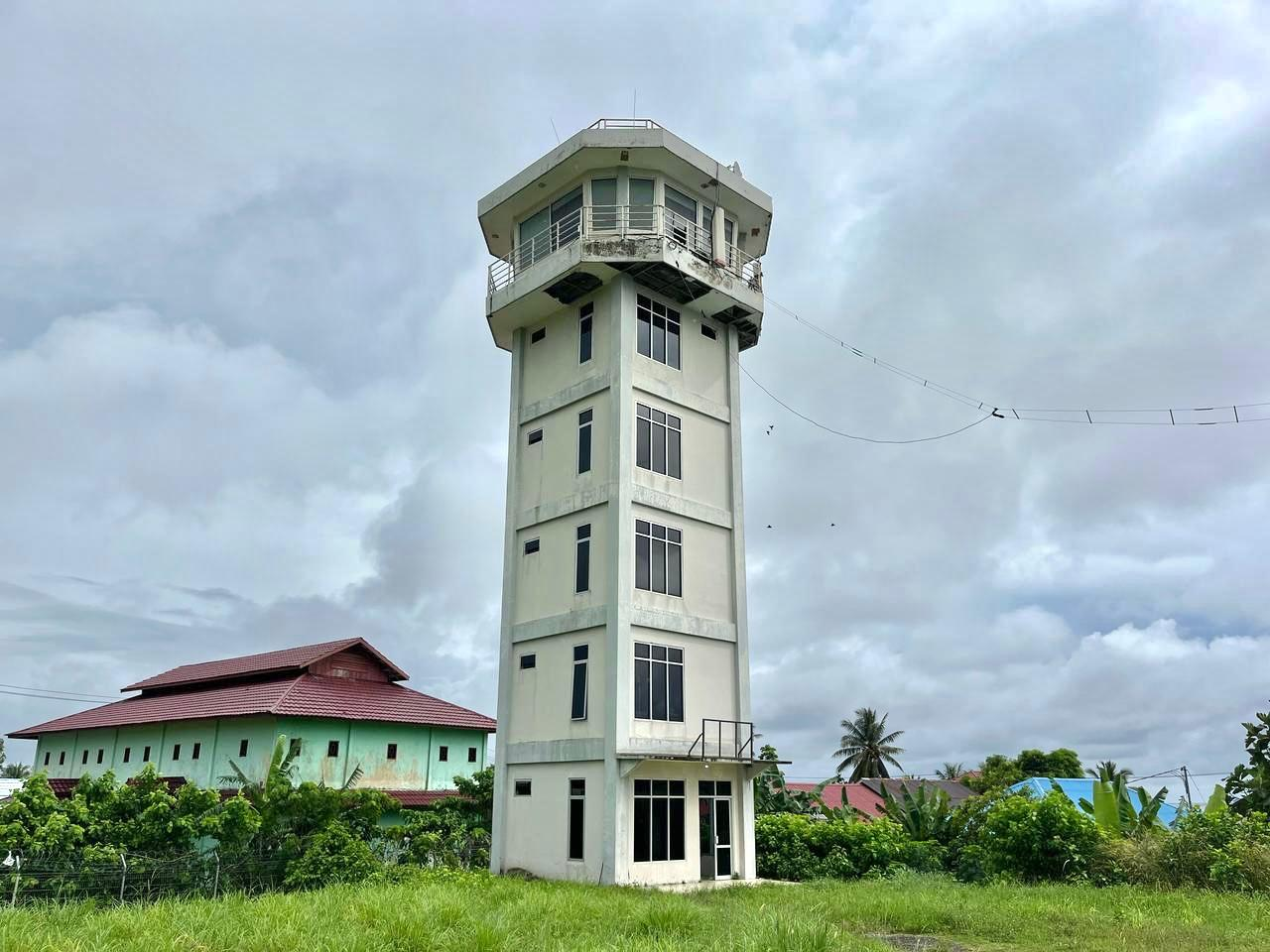
ATC tower

Prior to the construction of Maratua Airport, access to the Derawan Islands was relatively limited, with visitors relying primarily on speedboats from mainland Kalimantan, a journey that could take considerable time. To reach Maratua, visitors previously had to travel by boat from Tanjung Redeb to Derawan Island, a journey of approximately two hours, before transferring to another boat for the trip to Maratua Island, which took a further 1.5 hours. With the new airport, the journey from Tanjung Redeb to Maratua was expected to be reduced to approximately 30 minutes by air.

The airport was constructed to promote tourism and strengthen transportation connectivity, while also serving strategic and defense purposes due to Maratua Island's proximity to the borders of Malaysia and the Philippines. In addition to serving the transportation needs of the local population, the airport facilitates access for domestic and international tourists visiting the Derawan Islands, which are renowned for their internationally recognized marine tourism destinations.

Planning and budgeting for Maratua Airport began in 2008, following a proposal by the Berau Regency and East Kalimantan provincial governments. However, land clearing and construction did not begin until 2011. By June 2015, the 1,400 m × 30 m runway had been completed, although construction of the passenger terminal was still unfinished. As a result, the government proposed temporarily repurposing a building owned by the Berau Regency Government to serve as the airport's terminal. In September 2015, the foundation stone for the passenger terminal was laid, marking the official start of its construction.

By December 2016, construction of the airport had been fully completed. On 13 February 2017, a Wings Air ATR 72 successfully landed at Maratua Airport, marking an important milestone in the airport's development. The airport began operations in June 2017, initially handling charter flights operated by Wings Air and Garuda Indonesia. The airport was officially inaugurated by then-President of Indonesia Joko Widodo on 25 October 2018. The total cost of the airport construction project, initially proposed by the local government and later taken over by the Ministry of Transportation, was approximately Rp112.72 billion.

=== Contemporary history ===
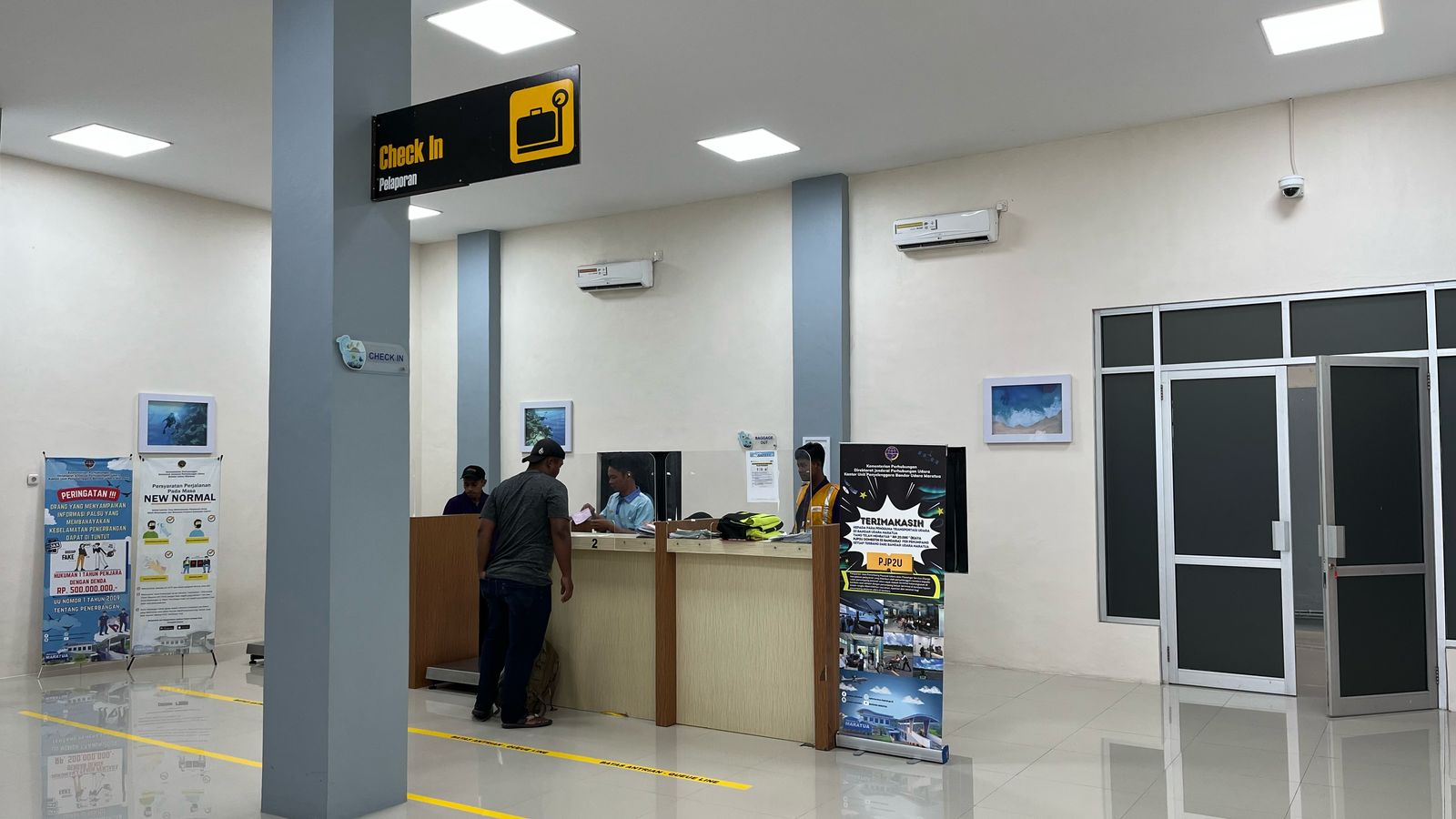
Check-in counters

In 2017, Maratua Airport recorded 693 arriving passengers and 692 departing passengers. Passenger traffic increased in 2018, with 1,220 arrivals and 1,303 departures.

By 2019, the airport had begun serving scheduled commercial routes to destinations including Balikpapan, Tanjung Redeb, and Tarakan, operated by TransNusa and Susi Air. In addition, Garuda Indonesia continued to operate charter flights to Balikpapan, while Wings Air expressed interest in launching scheduled services to Maratua at the time. In January 2020, Susi Air inaugurated a new route between Maratua and Samarinda, operated by a Cessna Grand Caravan. The route was subsidized by the central government as part of a program to support pioneer air services to remote and underserved areas.

In November 2023, Citilink expressed interest in launching routes between Tanjung Redeb and Maratua and between Samarinda and Maratua using ATR 72 aircraft, potentially complementing Susi Air, which was already operating services on these routes at the time.

In early 2026, the airport faced a threat from coastal erosion along the shoreline near the airport. In response, the East Kalimantan provincial government began constructing a seawall as an initial measure to protect the airport and its surrounding area from further erosion. At the same time, on January 2026, Wings Air launched flights between Tanjung Redeb and Maratua. However, the service lasted only for about two months due to very low passenger occupancy, likely because many visitors preferred traveling by speedboat, which was a more affordable option.

The Berau Regency Government has been actively encouraging more airlines to operate services to Maratua. It is currently lobbying Wings Air to resume flights to the island by introducing a Tanjung Redeb–Maratua–Samarinda route.

== Facilities and development ==
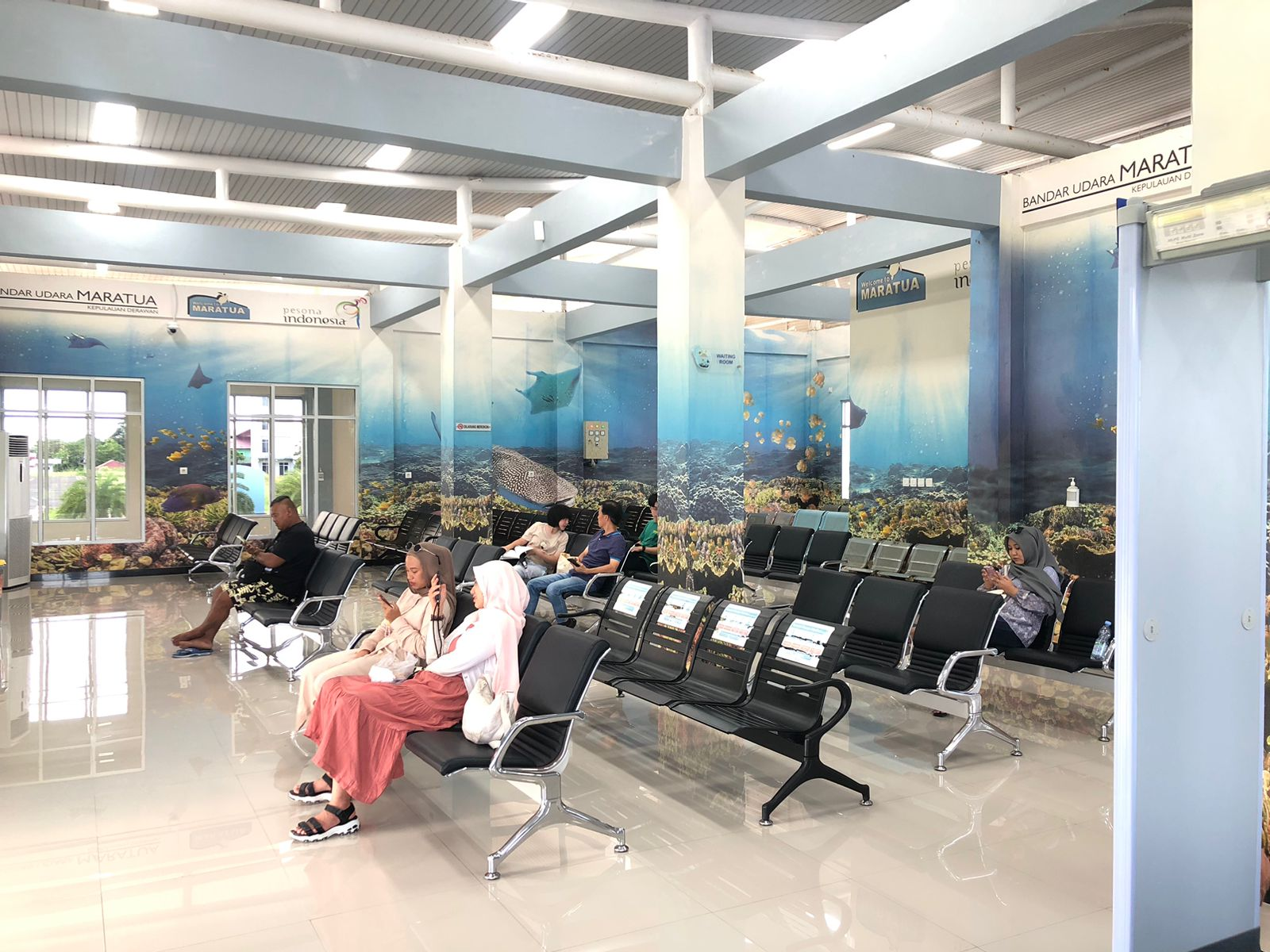
Boarding gate

The airport's landside facilities include a 400 m² passenger terminal capable of accommodating up to 36,000 passengers per year. Like a typical rural airstrip, the airport has a relatively modest passenger terminal equipped with basic facilities, including check-in counters, boarding gates, a baggage claim area, and a car park. The airport is also equipped with a solar power system that provides supplementary electricity for lighting and other landside facilities. Other facilities include a 108 m² Aircraft Rescue and Fire Fighting (PKP-PK) building, a 96 m² generator building, and a 50 m² administrative office. The airport also has a six-story operations building measuring 5 m × 4 m, two X-ray machines, and a 60 m × 8 m access road connecting the airport to the surrounding road network.

On the airside, the airport has a 1,600 m × 30 m runway, a 75 m × 15 m taxiway, and a 70 m × 100 m aircraft apron. This allows the airport to accommodate aircraft up to the size of an ATR 72, Cessna Grand Caravan and the de Havilland Canada DHC-6 Twin Otter. The runway is also equipped with 200-meter Runway End Safety Areas (RESA) at each end to enhance operational safety. The airport does not have a permanent Air Traffic Control (ATC) tower; instead, flight information services are provided through an Aerodrome Flight Information Service (AFIS) system. The apron has sufficient capacity to accommodate two to three small aircraft simultaneously. The runway is equipped with basic lighting, and flight operations are generally limited to daytime under Visual Flight Rules (VFR).

The runway is planned to be extended to approximately 2,000 m in the future, allowing the airport to accommodate narrow-body aircraft such as the Boeing 737 and Airbus A320.

== Airlines and destinations ==
Airlines	Destinations
Smart Aviation	Samarinda, Tanjung Redeb
Susi Air	Tarakan

== Statistics ==
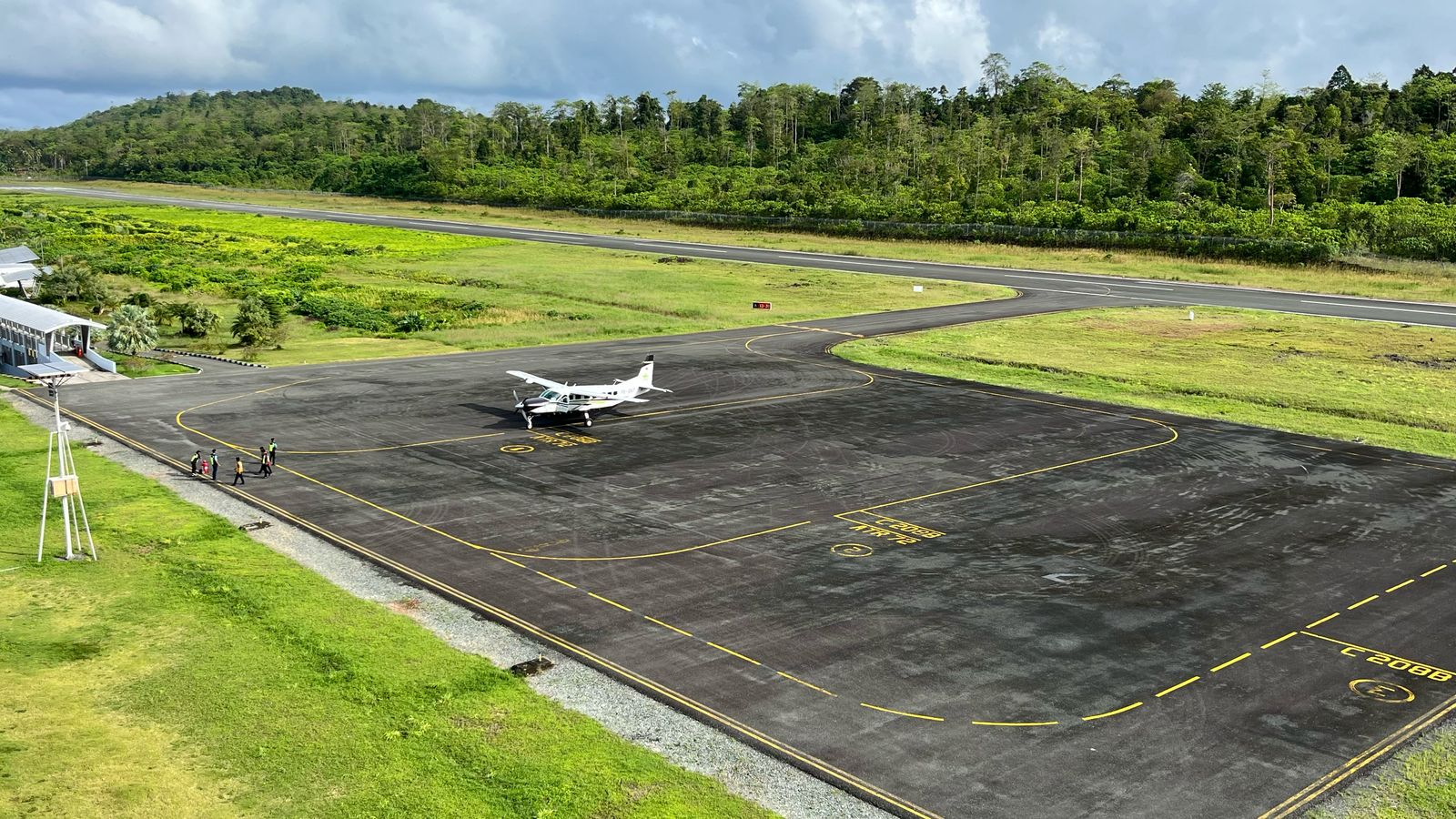
Apron view of Maratua Airport

Annual passenger numbers and aircraft statistics
Year	Passengers handled	Passenger % change	Cargo (tonnes)	Cargo % change	Aircraft movements	Aircraft % change
2017	1,385	Steady	N/A	Steady	N/A	Steady
2018	2,523	▲82.2	N/A	Steady	N/A	Steady
2019	2,249	▼10.9	N/A	Steady	238	Steady
2020	855	▼62.0	1.71	Steady	280	▲17.6
2021	2,620	▲206.4	0.26	▼84.8	506	▲80.7
2022	3,008	▲14.8	0.11	▼57.7	390	▼22.9
2023	4,146	▲37.8	0.02	▼81.8	449	▲15.1
2024	5,977	▲44.2	0.15	▲650.0	647	▲44.1
^{Source: DGCA, BPS}
