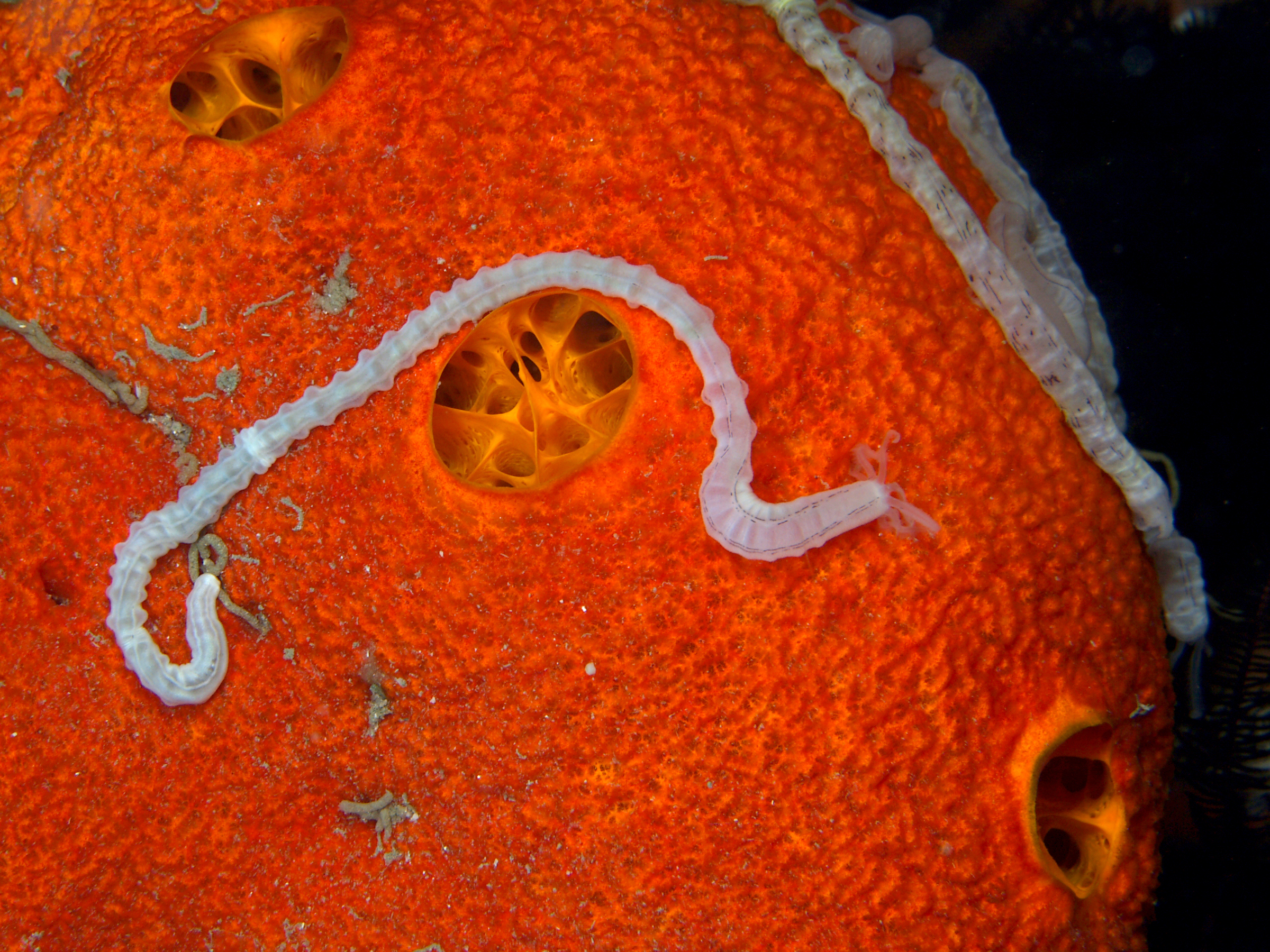
- Synaptula cf. lamperti (sea cucumber) on Plakortis sp. (chicken liver sponge)

Scientific classification
- Kingdom: Animalia
- Phylum: Echinodermata
- Class: Holothuroidea
- Order: Apodida
- Family: Synaptidae
- Genus: Synaptula; Oersted, 1849

= Synaptula =

Genus of sea cucumbers

Synaptula is a genus of sea cucumbers, in the family Synaptidae.

This genus contains many species, most of them whitish, often associated with sponges. However, they are extremely difficult to identify from sight, and many tropical Indo-Pacific are referred to as Synaptula lamperti, which is often the only species named by touristic guides.

== List of species ==
The genus contains the following species:

- Synaptula alba Heding, 1928
- Synaptula albolineata Heding, 1928
- Synaptula ater Heding, 1928
- Synaptula bandae Heding, 1928
- Synaptula denticulata Heding, 1928
- Synaptula hydriformis (Lesueur, 1824)
- Synaptula indivisa (Semper, 1867)
- Synaptula jolensis Heding, 1928
- Synaptula lactea (Sluiter, 1887)
- Synaptula lamperti Heding, 1928
- Synaptula macra (H. L. Clark, 1938)
- Synaptula maculata (Sluiter, 1887)
- Synaptula madreporica Heding, 1928
- Synaptula media Cherbonnier & Féral, 1984
- Synaptula minima Heding, 1928
- Synaptula mortensenii Heding, 1929
- Synaptula neirensis Heding, 1928
- Synaptula psara (Sluiter, 1887)
- Synaptula reciprocans (Forskal, 1775)
- Synaptula recta (Semper, 1867)
- Synaptula reticulata (Semper, 1867)
- Synaptula rosea Heding, 1928
- Synaptula rosetta Heding, 1928
- Synaptula secreta Ancona Lopez, 1957
- Synaptula spinifera Massin & Tomascik, 1996
- Synaptula tualensis Heding, 1928
- Synaptula varians (Nair, 1946)
- Synaptula violacea Heding, 1928
- Synaptula virgata (Sluiter, 1901)

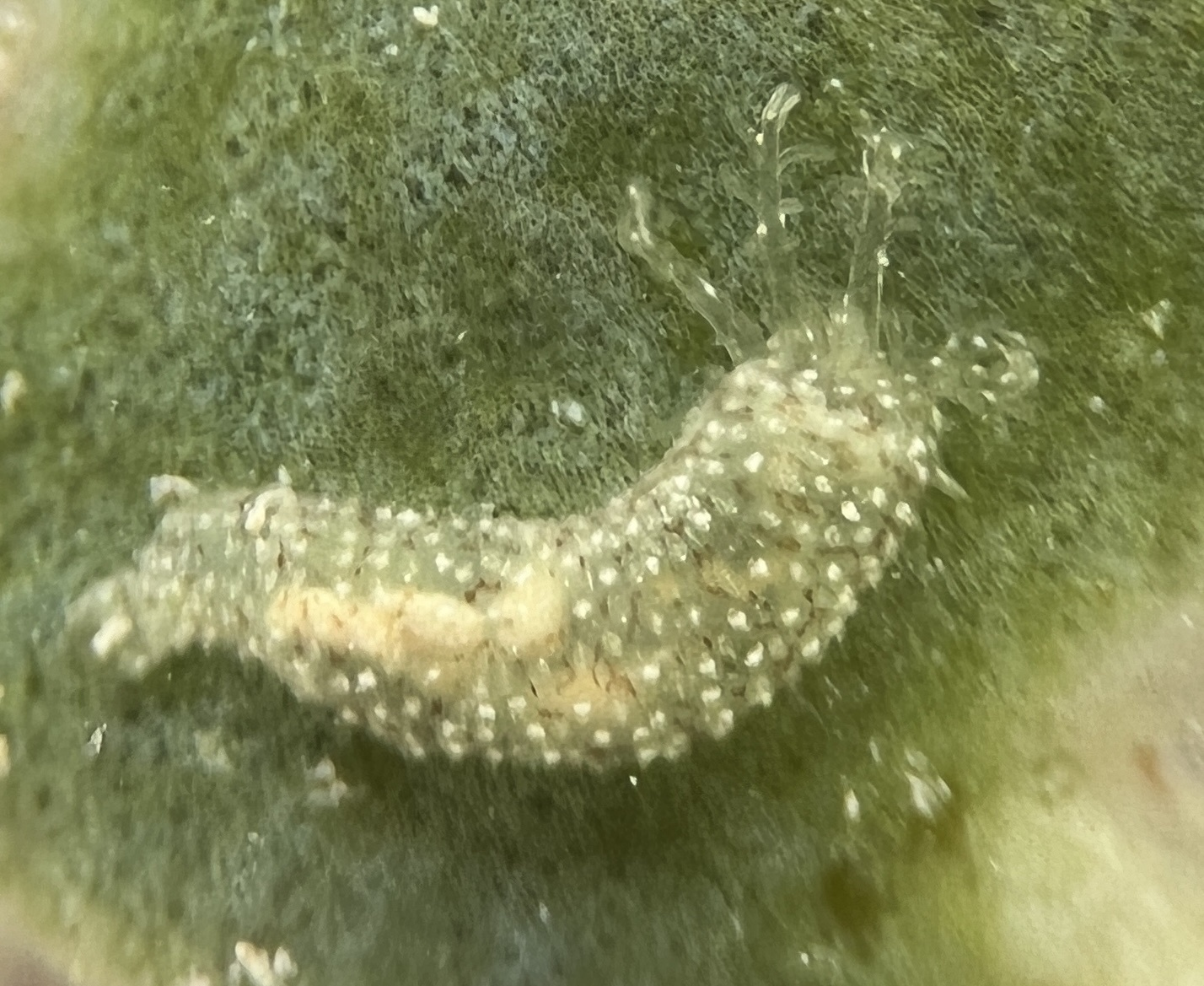
Synaptula hydriformis

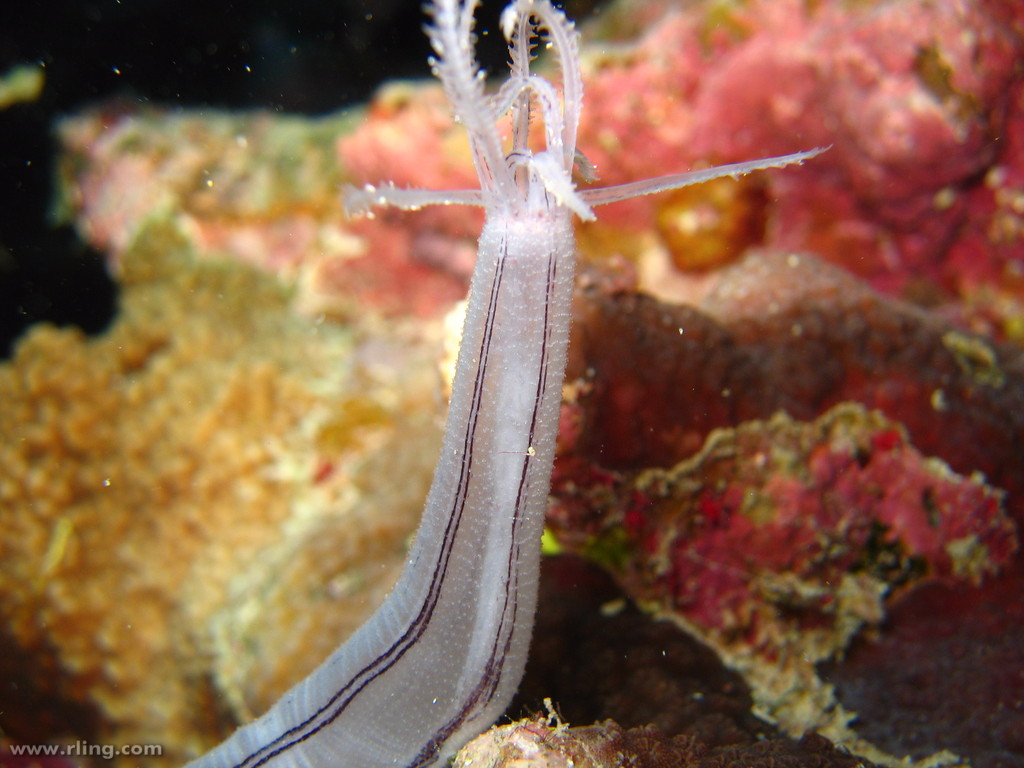
Synaptula cf. lamperti

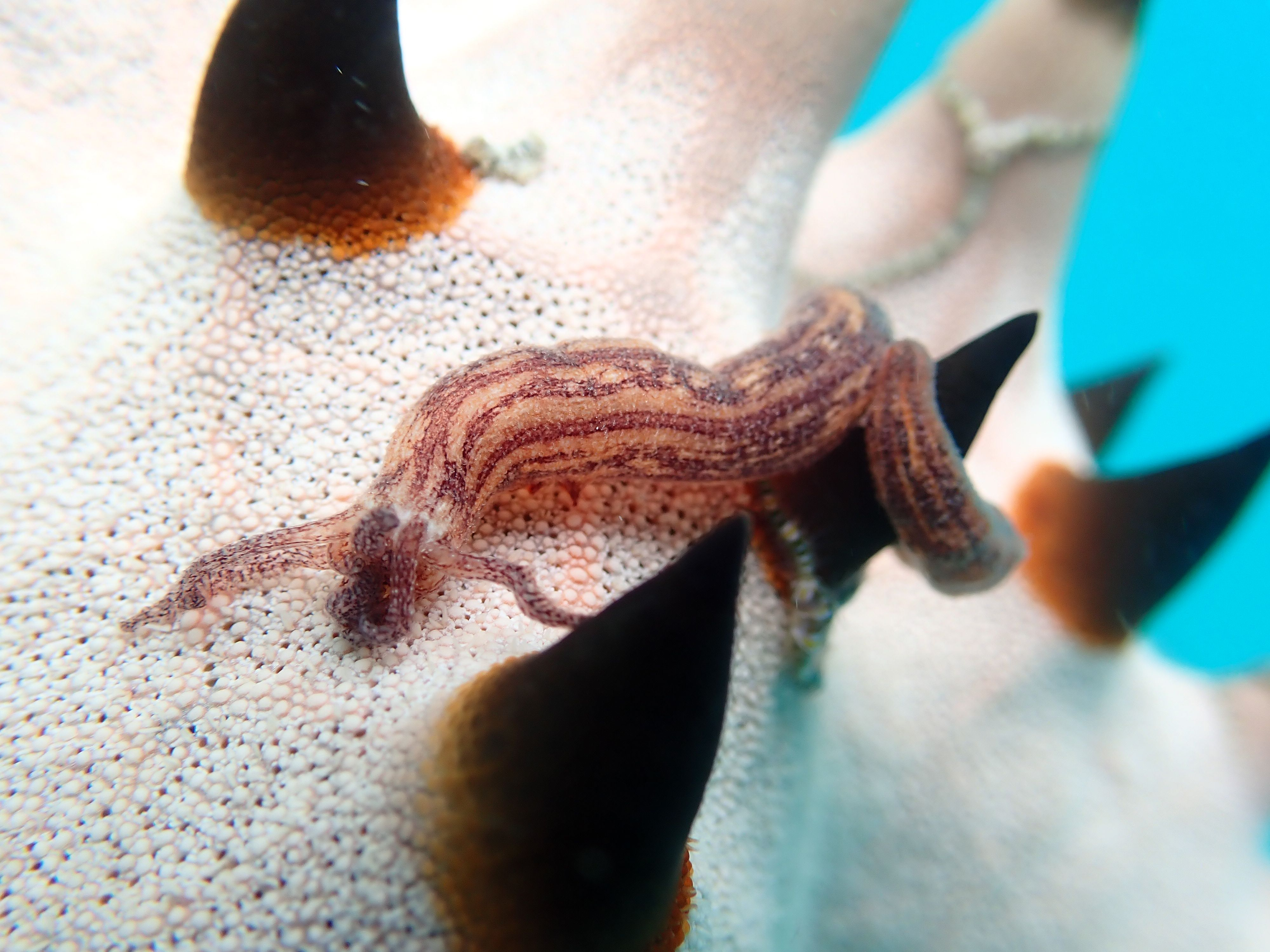
Synaptula media

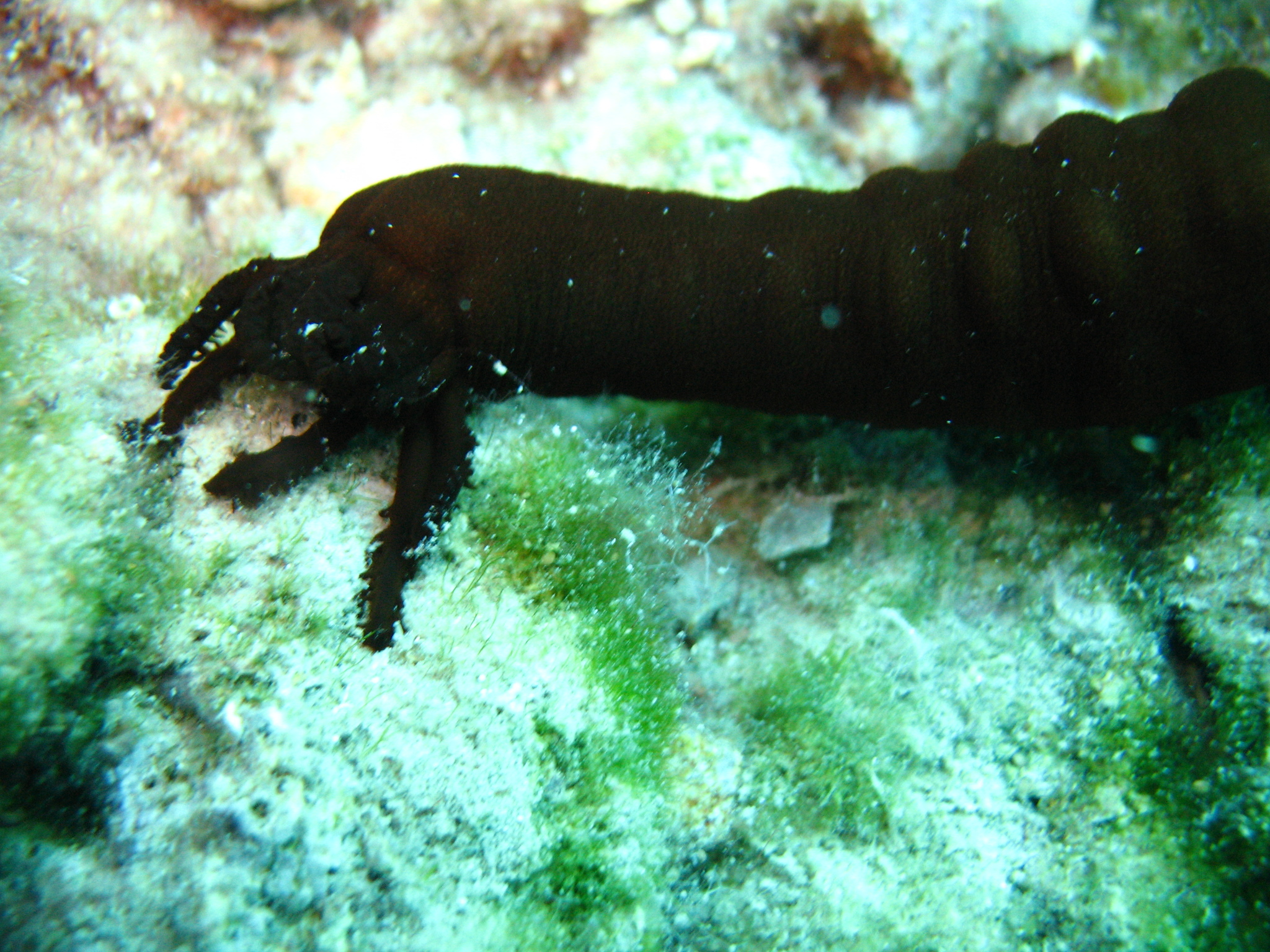
Synaptula reciprocans

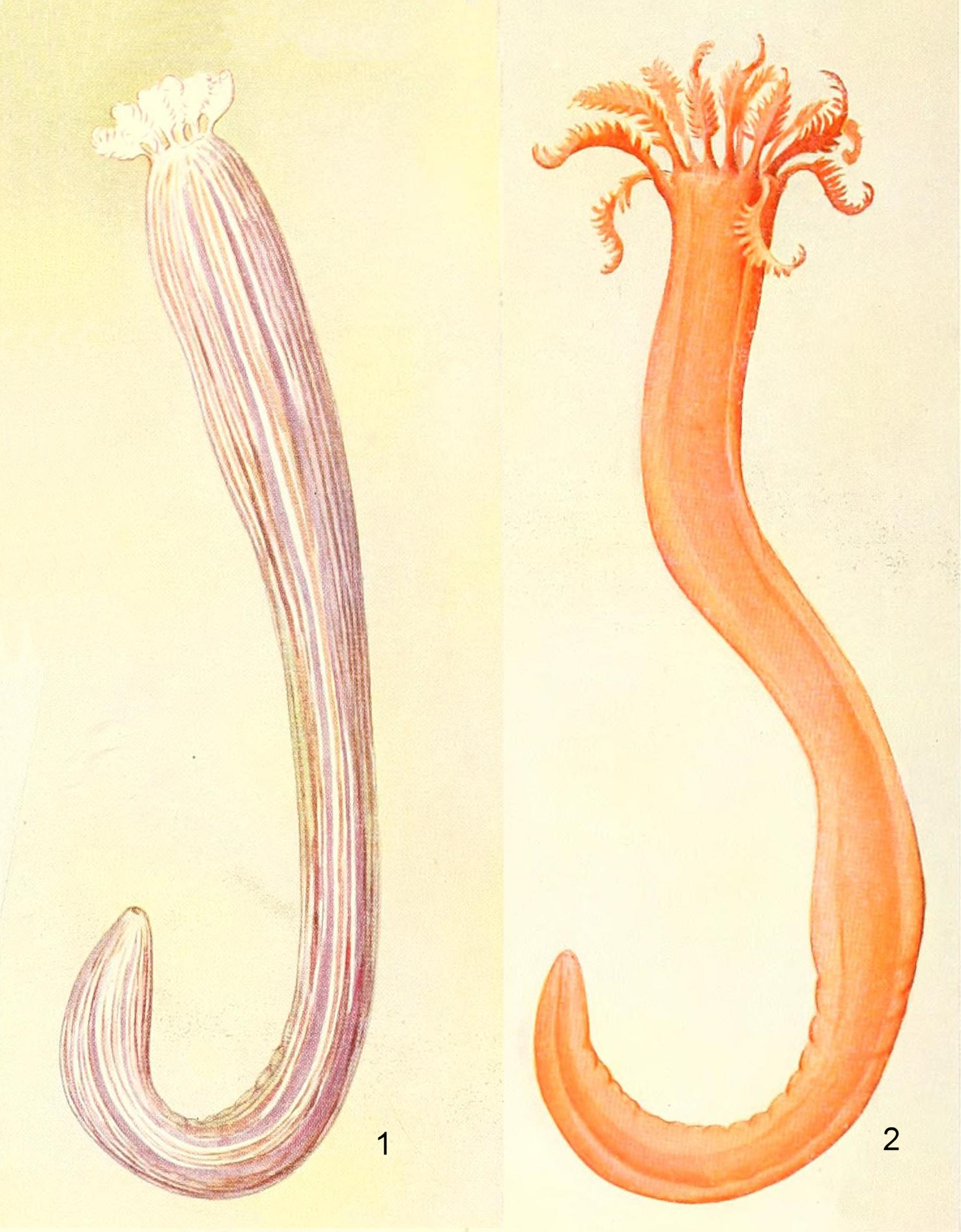
Synaptula recta

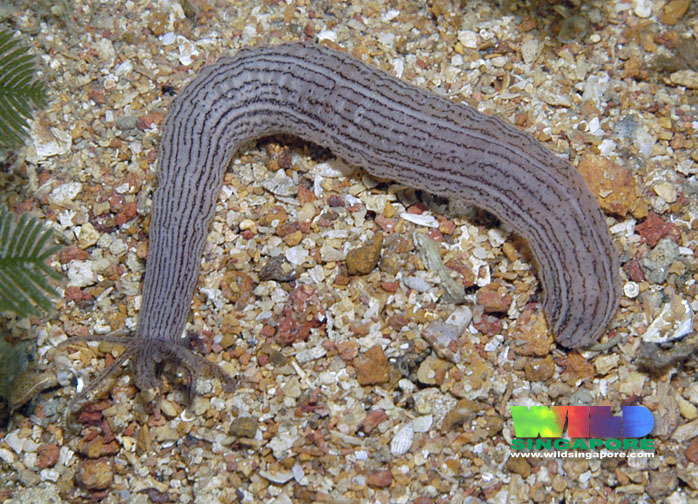
Unidentified Synaptula
