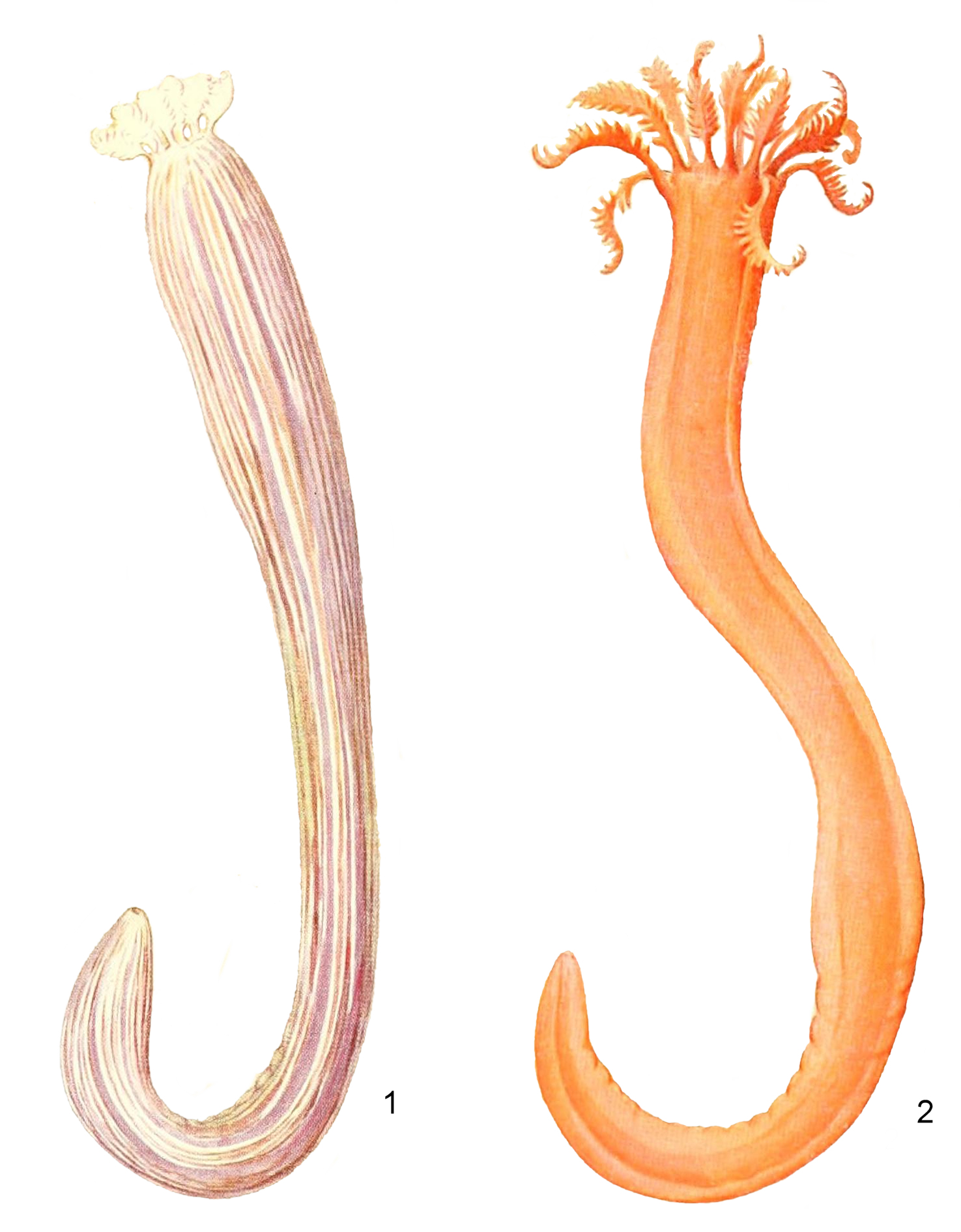

Scientific classification
- Kingdom: Animalia
- Phylum: Echinodermata
- Class: Holothuroidea
- Order: Apodida
- Family: Synaptidae
- Genus: Synaptula
- Species: S. recta

Binomial name
- Synaptula recta (Semper, 1867)

Synonyms
- Chondrocloea striata (Sluiter, 1887); Chondrocloea albo-punctata Sluiter, 1901; Synapta recta Semper, 1867; Synapta striata Sluiter, 1887; Synaptula boweniensis Heding, 1931; Synaptula rubra Heding, 1931; Synaptula striata (Sluiter, 1887)

= Synaptula recta =

Species of sea cucumber

Synaptula recta, sometimes known as the gut-like sea cucumber, is a species of sea cucumber in the family Synaptidae in the phylum Echinodermata. It occurs in shallow water in the tropical Indo-Pacific region.

== Description ==
Synaptula recta is an elongated sea cucumber growing to a maximum length of about 40 cm (16 in). The mouth is at the anterior end and is surrounded by thirteen feeding tentacles. The colour is variable but it is often a deep colour, ranging from dark reddish-purple to a fairly bright red, olive or a pattern of longitudinal lilac stripes on a pale background. The calcareous spicules in the cuticle consist of anchors with knobbed ends and curved bodies. The tips of these spicules project through the cuticle and help give traction during locomotion which is performed by peristalsis, synaptids having no tube feet.

== Distribution and habitat ==
Synaptula recta is native to the tropical western Indo-Pacific region. Its range extends from the Red Sea, the Maldives and Sri Lanka to northern Australia, Indonesia, the Philippines and several Pacific island groups. It inhabits coastal waters and reefs, sand flats and seagrass meadows and occurs at depths down to about 20 m (66 ft).

== Ecology ==
Synaptula recta is nocturnal and feeds on detritus and planktonic particles which it sweeps into its mouth with its feeding tentacles. It is often found moving over and feeding on debris on the surfaces of sponges.

The sexes are separate and fertilisation is external. The larvae are planktonic, the first-stage auricularia larvae developing into barrel-shaped, doliolaria larvae which when sufficiently developed settle on the seabed and undergo metamorphosis into juvenile sea cucumbers.
