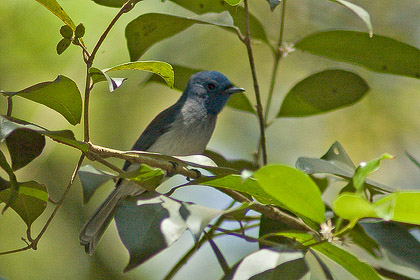
- Black-naped monarch (Hypothymis azurea)

Scientific classification
- Kingdom: Animalia
- Phylum: Chordata
- Class: Aves
- Order: Passeriformes
- Family: Monarchidae
- Genus: Hypothymis; F. Boie, 1826

Type species
- Muscicapa caerulea Gmelin, 1788

Synonyms
- Camiguinia; Cyanomyas; Cyanomyias

= Hypothymis =

Genus of birds

Hypothymis is a genus of birds in the family Monarchidae.

The genus was introduced by the German zoologist Friedrich Boie in 1826 with the black-naped monarch (Hypothymis azurea) as the type species. The word Hypothymis is from the Ancient Greek hupothumis, the name of an unidentified bird mentioned by the playwright Aristophanes.

== Species ==
The genus contains four species:

Male	Female	Common name	Scientific name	Distribution
		Black-naped monarch	Hypothymis azurea	tropical southern Asia from Iran and Sri Lanka east to Indonesia and the Philippines
		Pale-blue monarch	Hypothymis puella	eastern Indonesia.
		Short-crested monarch	Hypothymis helenae	Philippines.
		Celestial monarch	Hypothymis coelestis	Philippines.
