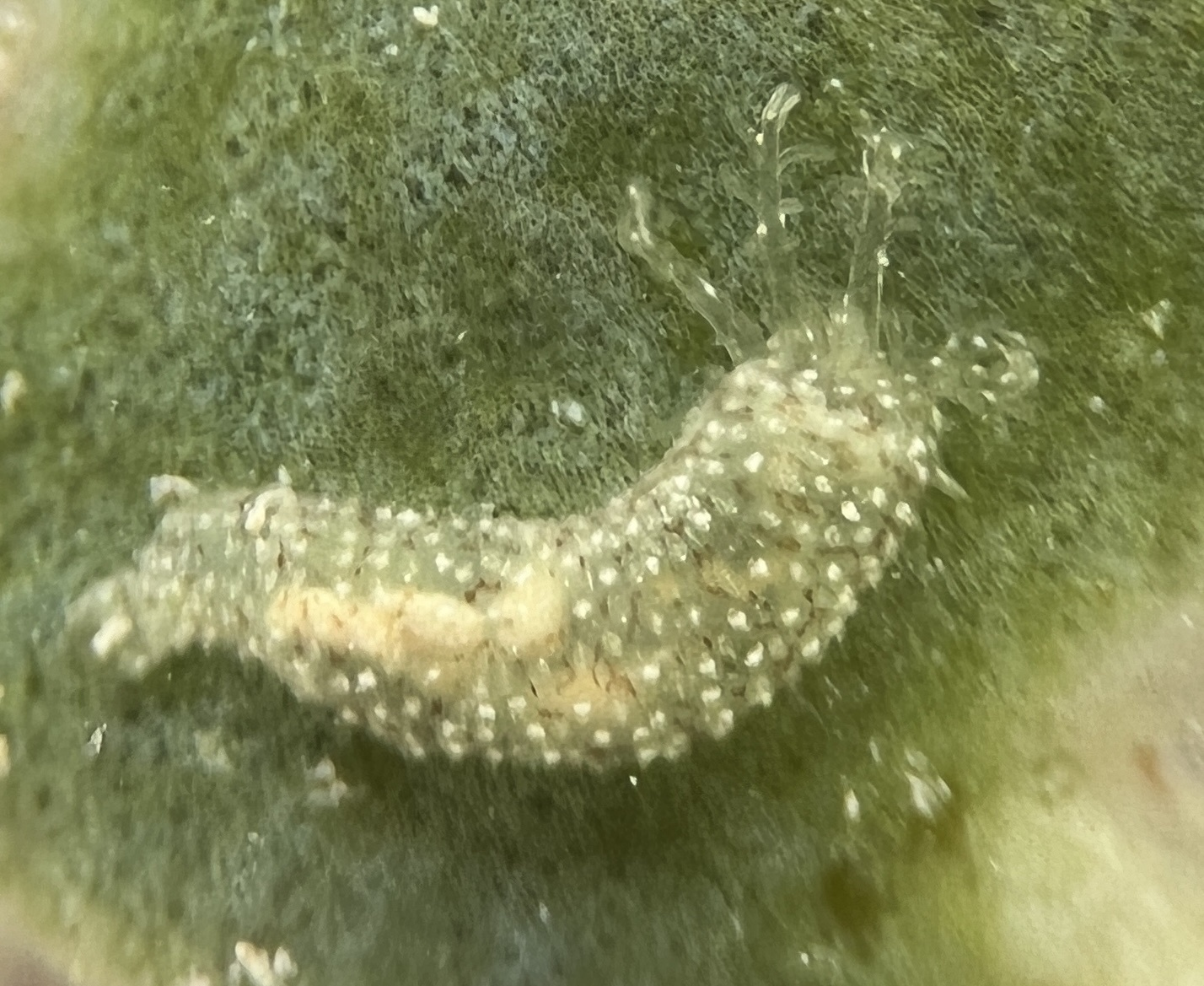

Scientific classification
- Kingdom: Animalia
- Phylum: Echinodermata
- Class: Holothuroidea
- Order: Apodida
- Family: Synaptidae
- Genus: Synaptula
- Species: S. hydriformis

Binomial name
- Synaptula hydriformis (Lesueur, 1824)

= Synaptula hydriformis =

Species of sea cucumber

Synaptula hydriformis is a species of sea cucumber in the family Synaptidae.

== Description ==
Synaptula hydriformis is a relatively small species of sea cucumber with a vermiform body that can grow up to 10 cm long, though they are often shorter. As a synaptid sea cucumber, the species does not have any tube feet along its body. Around the mouth, S. hydriformis has 12 feather-like tentacles with webbed bases. Each of these tentacles can have up to 20 pairs of lateral digits. The sea cucumber has multiple color morphs, including pale white or translucent, brown, striped, red, and green.

Within the fragile dermal layer of S. hydriformis are two types of microscopic ossicles. The anchor ossicles, which are typically about 120 µm long, hook into net-like plate ossicles that are typically 95–130 µm wide.

== Distribution and habitat ==
Synaptula hydriformis can be found throughout the Gulf of Mexico, the eastern coast of Florida, the Caribbean Sea, and the eastern coast of South America to Brazil. Within this range, the sea cucumber lives in habitats where it can be associated with marine plants, such as amongst mangrove, seagrass beds, and coral reefs. These habitats allow for its cryptic coloration to help it hide from predators.

== Biology ==
As S. hydriformis lacks tube feet, it uses a combination of its tentacles and peristaltic body motions to move. This motion is similar to many benthic annelids. The tentacles also allow it to climb up the side of surfaces. Calcareous anchor-like ossicles in its dermis act as hooks that hold it to surfaces.

The reproductive biology of S. hydriformis is unique compared to other sea cucumbers and echinoderms. S. hydriformis are hermaphroditic and can self-fertilize, creating clone-like offspring. As they develop, their gastrula form directly into the adult body form without the intermediate larval form that is present with most other echinoderms. The young start to develop within the parent, with matrotrophy helping sustain their growth. These young are then birthed with live birth. S. hydriformis can also have superfetation, in which young from different spawning events develop at the same time in the parent.

== Ecology ==
Living within the dermis of S. hydriformis are symbiotic bacteria that appear as brown spots on the body.
