= Maratua =

- District
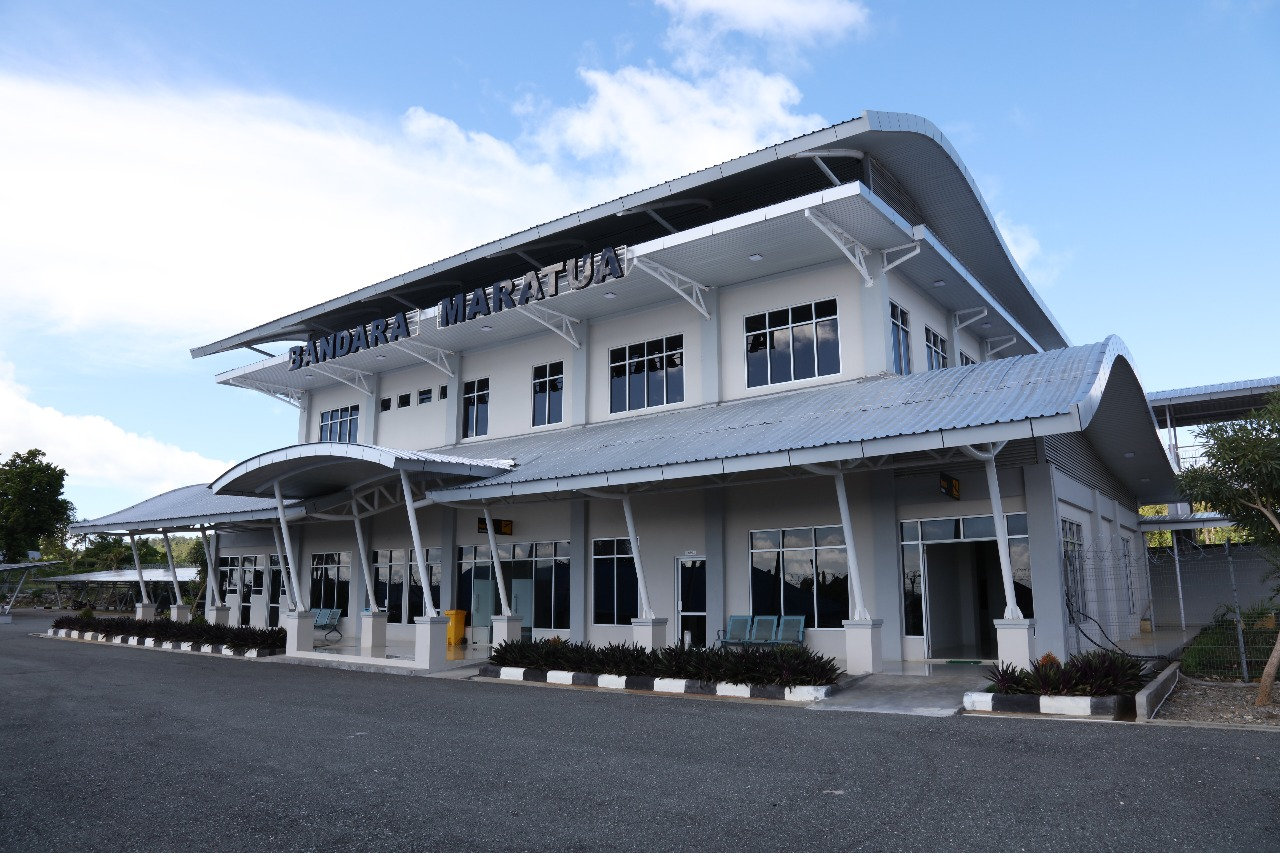
- Maratua Airport

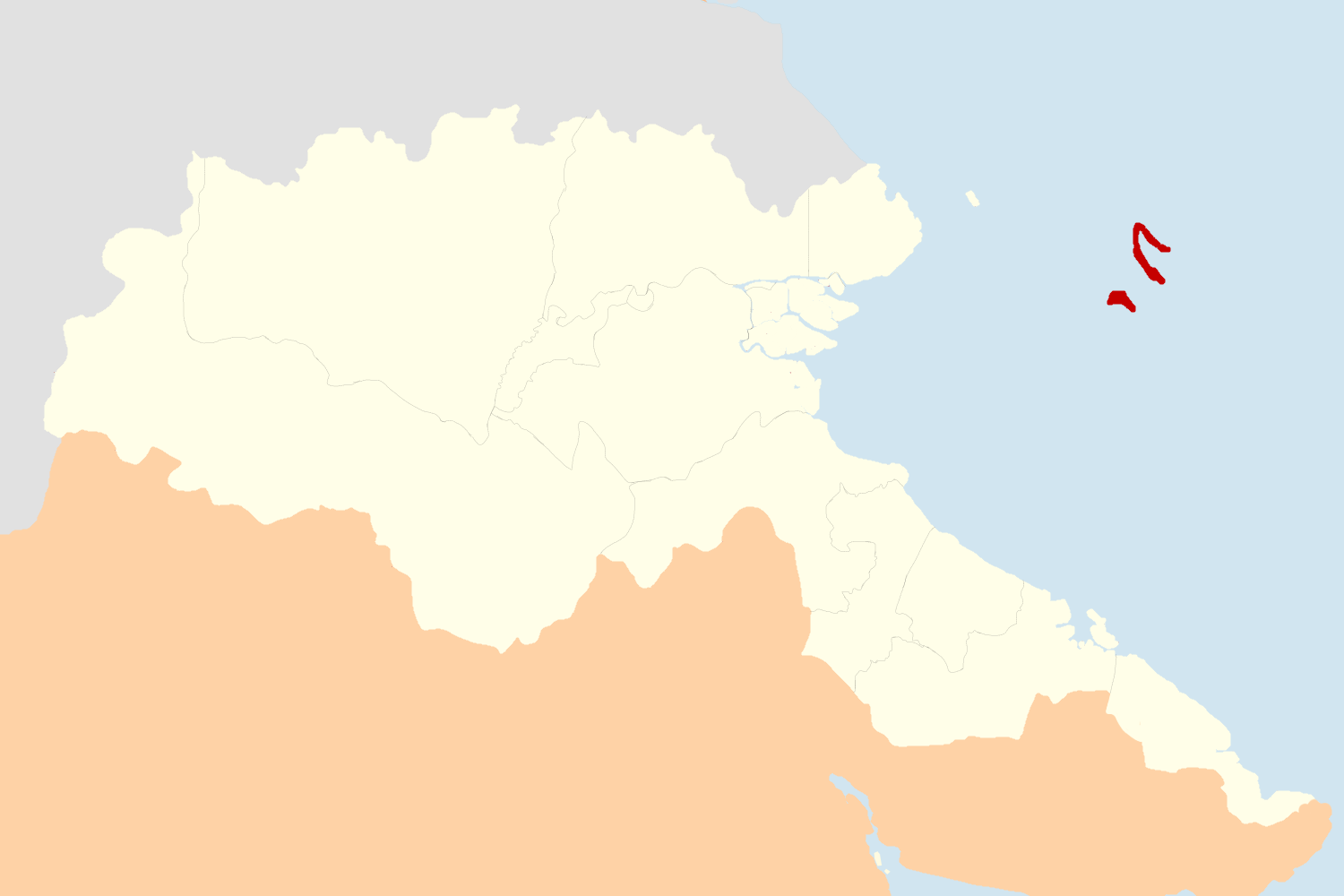
- Location within Berau Regency

- Location within East Kalimantan Location within Kalimantan Location within Indonesia
- Coordinates: 2°14′49.844″N 118°33′48.1943″E
- Country: Indonesia
- Province: East Kalimantan
- Regency: Berau
- District seat: Teluk Harapan

Area
  - Total: 5,616.26 km^{2} (2,168.45 sq mi)

Population (2020)
  - Total: 3,664
  - Density: 0.6524/km^{2} (1.690/sq mi)

Maratua is a district (kecamatan) in Berau Regency, East Kalimantan, Indonesia. In the 2020 Census, it was inhabited by 3,664 people, and has a total area of 5,616.26 km^{2}.

== Geography ==
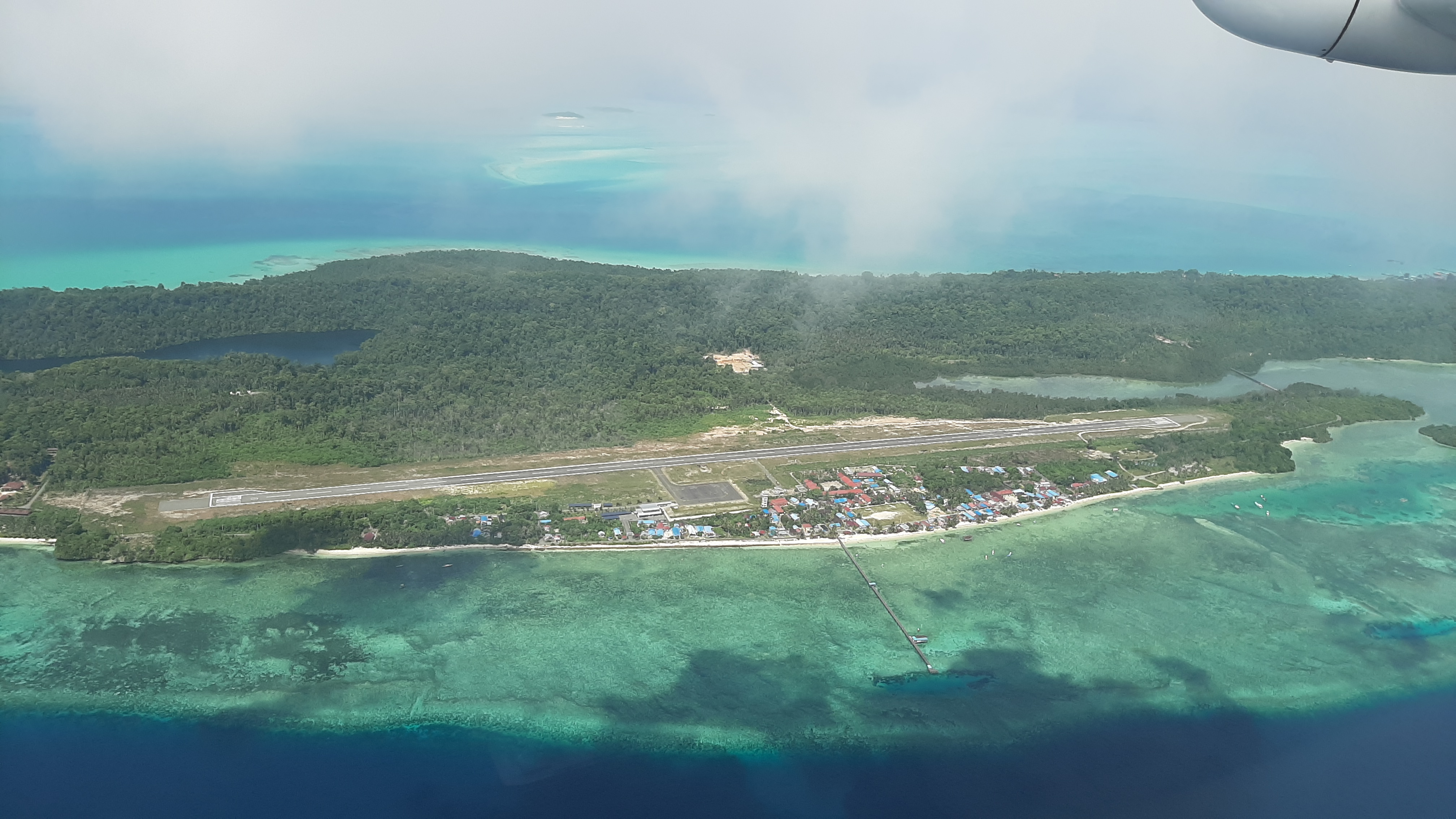
Maratua Island

Maratua consists of four villages:

- Bohe Silian
- Payung-Payung
- Teluk Alulu
- Teluk Harapan
