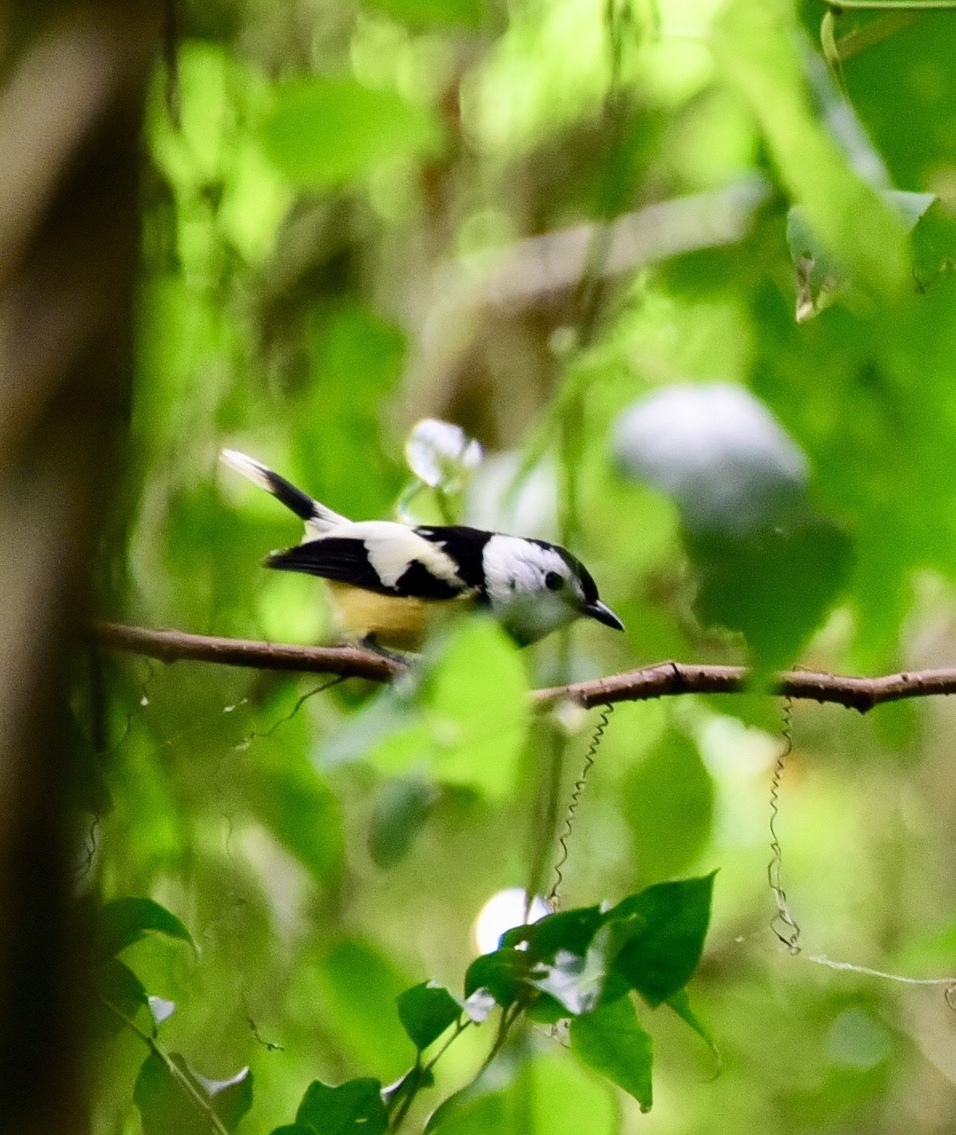

Conservation status
- Least Concern (IUCN 3.1)

Scientific classification
- Kingdom: Animalia
- Phylum: Chordata
- Class: Aves
- Order: Passeriformes
- Family: Monarchidae
- Genus: Neolalage; Mathews, 1928
- Species: N. banksiana

Binomial name
- Neolalage banksiana (G.R. Gray, 1870)

Synonyms
- Lalage banksiana

= Buff-bellied monarch =

Species of bird

The buff-bellied monarch (Neolalage banksiana) is a species of bird in the family Monarchidae. It is monotypic within the genus Neolalage. It is endemic to Vanuatu, where its natural habitat is subtropical or tropical moist lowland forests.

The buff-bellied monarch was originally described in the genus Lalage. Alternate names include Banksian monarch, buff-bellied flycatcher, New Hebrides flycatcher, New Hebrides monarch, Pacific monarch (a name shared with the pale-blue monarch) and Vanuatu flycatcher.
