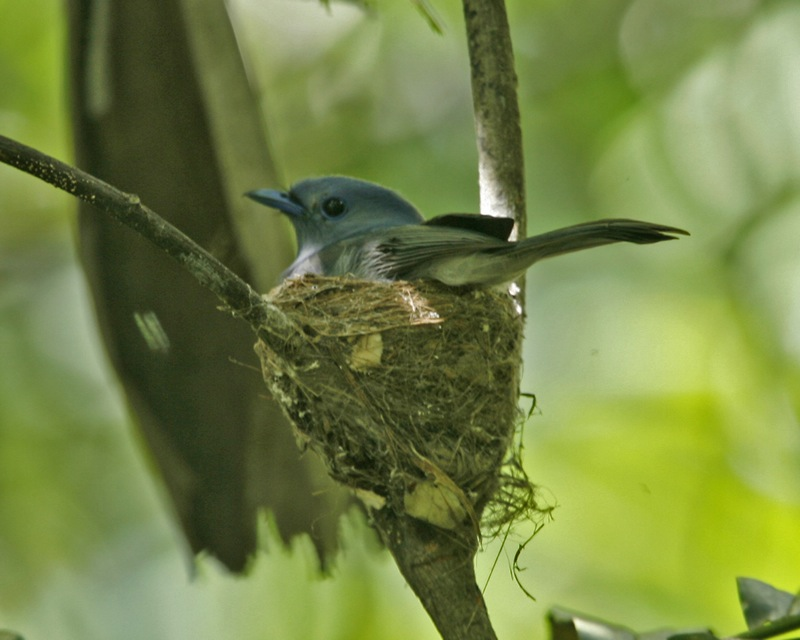
- female

Conservation status
- Least Concern (IUCN 3.1)

Scientific classification
- Kingdom: Animalia
- Phylum: Chordata
- Class: Aves
- Order: Passeriformes
- Family: Monarchidae
- Genus: Hypothymis
- Species: H. puella

Binomial name
- Hypothymis puella (Wallace, 1863)

Subspecies
- See text

Synonyms
- Hypothymis azurea puella; Myiagra puella

= Pale-blue monarch =

Species of bird

The pale-blue monarch (Hypothymis puella) is a small passerine bird in the family Monarchidae endemic to eastern Indonesia.

== Taxonomy and systematics ==
The pale-blue monarch was originally described in the genus Myiagra and then classified as subspecies of the widespread black-naped monarch, Hypothymis azurea, until split by the IOC in 2013 to describe a new species. Some other authourities have not yet adopted this species split. The alternate name Moluccan monarch should not be confused with the species of the same name, Symposiachrus bimaculatus. Additional alternate names for the pale-blue monarch include Pacific monarch (a name shared with the buff-bellied monarch), Pacific small monarch and small monarch.

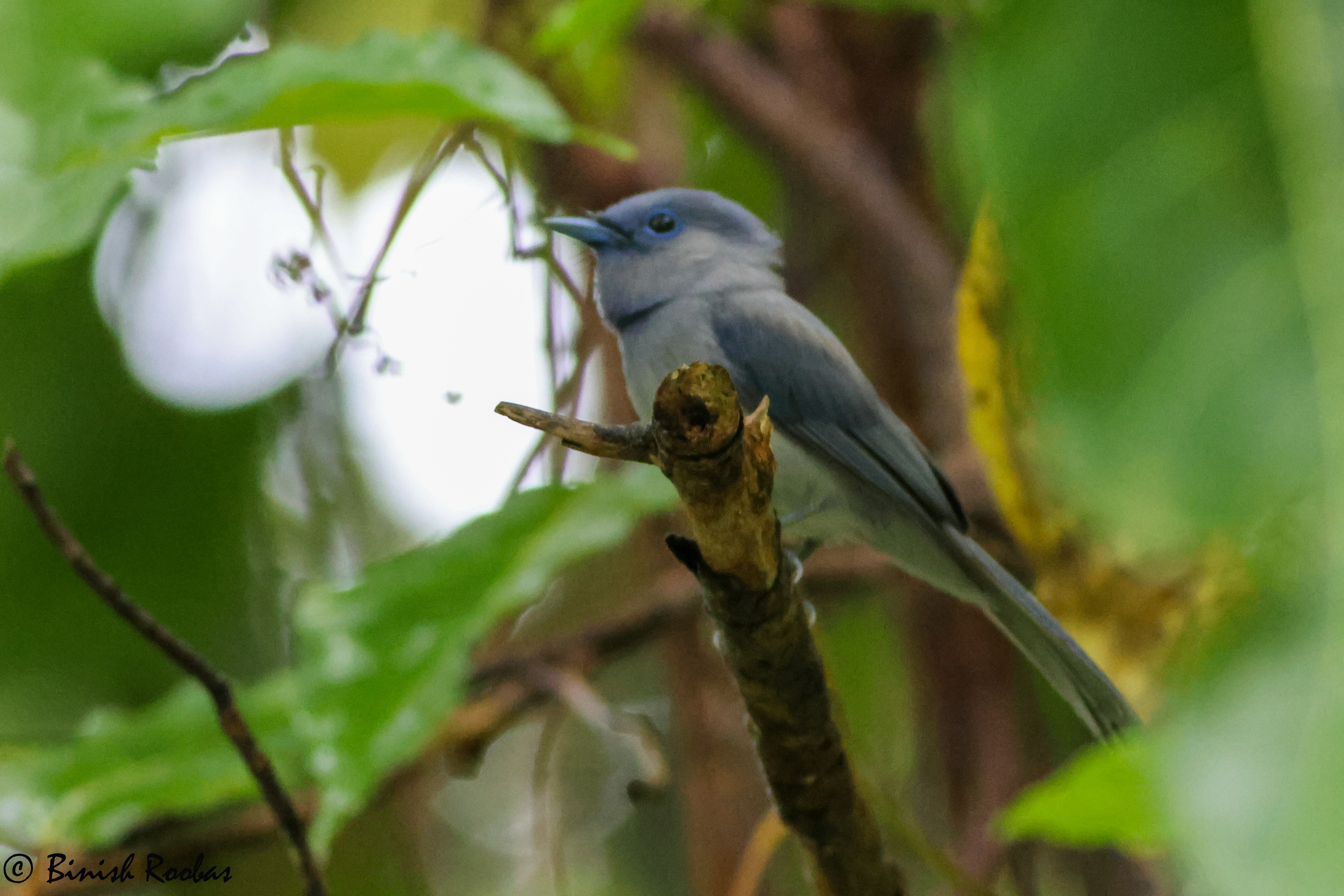
Pale-blue monarch (Hypothymis puella) from Tangkoko, Sulawesi

=== Subspecies ===
Two subspecies are recognized:

- H. p. puella - (Wallace, 1863): Found on Sulawesi and adjacent islands
- H. p. blasii - Hartert, 1898: Found in the Banggai archipelago.

== Behaviour and ecology ==
The pale-blue monarch is a forest species which builds a small cup nest. It has short legs and sits very upright whilst perched prominently, like a shrike. It is insectivorous, often hunting by flycatching.
