= Derawan Islands =

Island group in Indonesia

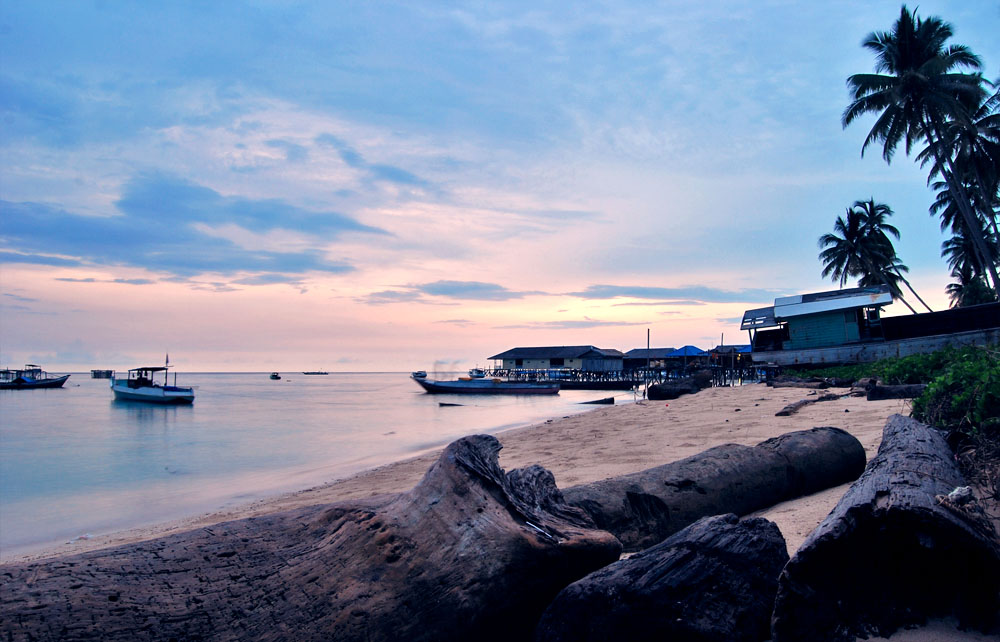
Maratua Island shoreline

The Derawan Islands (Indonesian: Kepulauan Derawan) are in the province of East Kalimantan in Indonesia. They consist of 31 islands, most well known among these are the islands of Derawan, Kakaban, Maratua, and Sangalaki. There are also numerous submerged reefs and islets. They are located in the Sulawesi Sea, on the coastal shelf of East Kalimantan (2°17′N – 118°13′E). The islands are part of the Berau Regency.

== Biodiversity ==
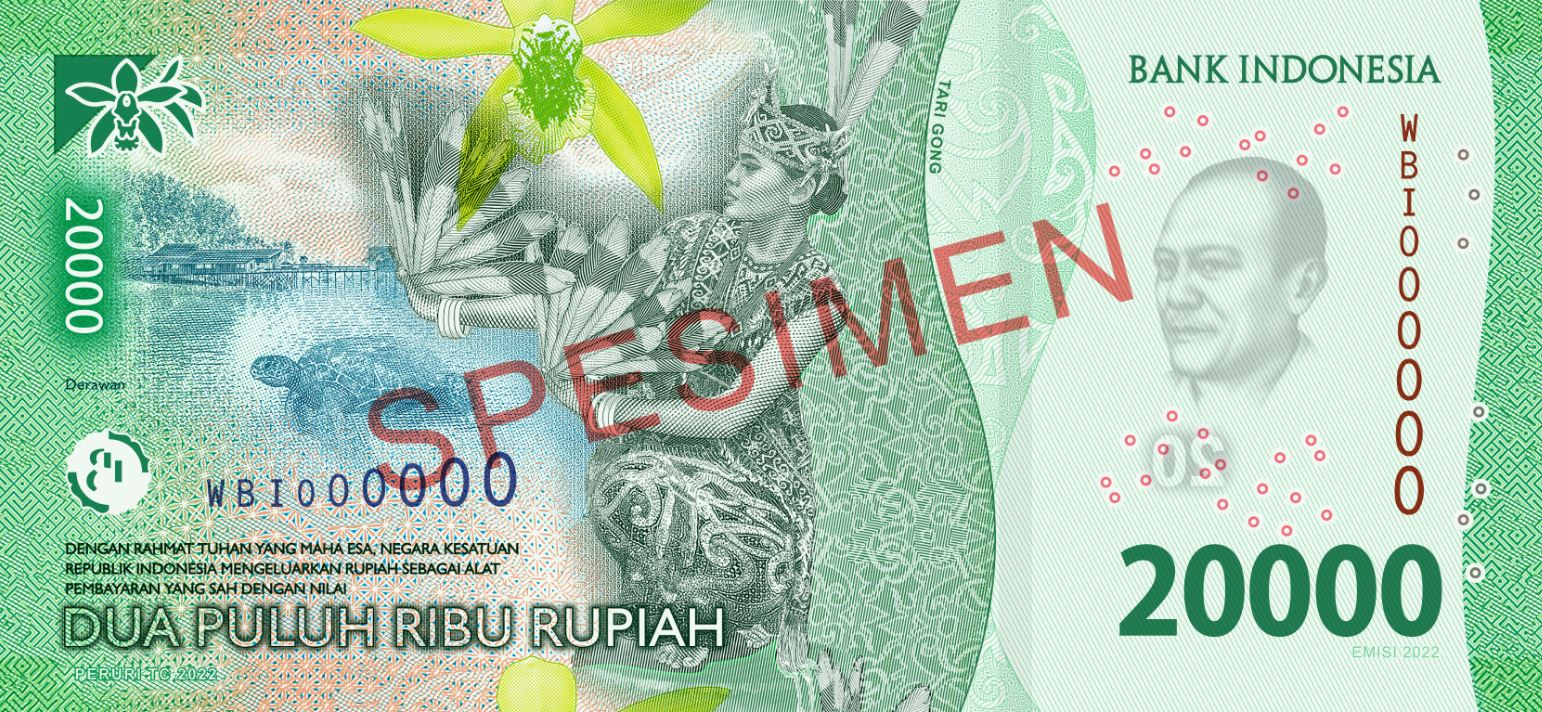
Derawan Islands featured on the reverse of the 20,000 rupiah banknote

Derawan islands is part of the Coral Triangle, which contains some of the richest marine biodiversity on earth. Located in a biodiversity hotspot, the Derawan Islands feature 872 species of reef fishes, 507 species of coral, and invertebrates, including protected species (5 giants clam species, 2 sea turtles, coconut crab, etc.). Some of the islands harbor the heavily exploited turtle eggs and yet the largest green turtle nesting site in Indonesia.

== Stingless jellyfish ==
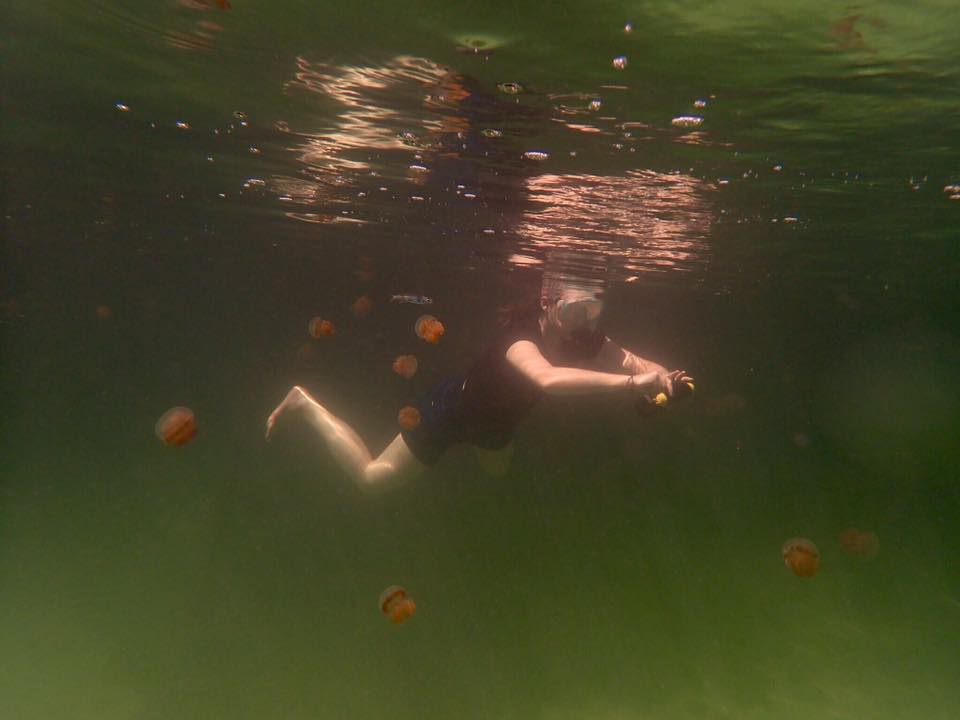
Snorkelling in the stingless jellyfish lake

Derawan Islands have at least two lakes containing stingless jellyfish, one in Kakaban Island and the other in Maratua Island with Haji Buang Pond. Kakaban is more famous than the second, which is also more difficult to access. The lake in Kakaban consists of millions of jellyfish, ranging from small to large ones, some, twice as big as an adult's palm. Indonesia has at least 7 lakes with stingless jellyfish. Some others are located in: Raja Ampat, West Papua, Togean Island, Central Sulawesi and one in Rote Island, East Nusa Tenggara.

== Resources use ==
There are two inhabited islands, namely Derawan (with a village of 1,259 people) and Maratua (comprising four villages with 2,704 people). Fishing is an important income-generating activity for the community. Since the early 1990s, people have caught live groupers, Napoleon wrasse, and lobsters, to fill high demand. There are three diving resorts in the Derawan Islands, while more additional resorts or facilities are in the planning process.

== Caves ==
Maratua Island has an area of 35.5 square kilometers and has at least 13 caves, but the prediction is that there are more than a hundred caves which are not yet explored. The caves usually have connection directly to the sea. These caves originated from reef which sea water infiltrated into, creating underground channels.

== Islands ==
There are 31 named islands (see table)

Names of islands
No.	Island Name	Hectare (ha)
1.	Semut island	6.9
2.	Andongabu Island	5.3
3.	Bakungan Island	8.7
4.	Bantaian Island	230.6
5.	Besing Island	560.1
6.	Bonggong Island	123.2
7.	Bulingisan Island	4.5
8.	Derawan Island	44.6
9.	Maratua Island	2375.7
10.	Nunukan	4.8
11.	Panjang Island	565.4
12.	Rabu-rabu Island	26.7
13.	Sangalaki Island	15.9
14.	Sangalan Island	3.5
15.	Sapinang Island	241.3
16.	Semama Island	91.1
17.	Sidau Island	31.2
18.	Tiaung Island	372.5
19.	Pabahanan Island	2.0
20.	Kakaban	774.2
21.	Sodang Besar Island	6145.8
22.	Telasau Island	1080.0
23.	Tempurung Island	1291.2
24.	Bilang-bilangan Island	25.2
25.	Manimbora Island	2.0
26.	Blambangan Island	22.0
27.	Sambit Island	18.0
28.	Mataha Island	25.8
29.	Kaniungan Besar Island	73.3
30.	Kaniungan Kecil Island	10.2
31.	Bali Kukup Island	18.2

== Airport and seaport ==
On 11 September 2015 Maratua Airport with runway 1,200 meters has been operated to boost tourism and also to secure defence strategy due to Maratua island is near the border with Malaysia and the Philippines. Samarinda International Airport is the main gateway to Derawan.

== See also ==
- East Kalimantan
- List of islands of Indonesia
