= List of birds of Solomon Islands =

Several bird species have been recorded in Solomon Islands (the state, excluding areas of the wider Solomon Islands archipelago such as Bougainville Island which is part of the state of Papua New Guinea). The area's avifauna include a total of 321 species, of which 76 are endemic, and three have been introduced by humans. Of these, 28 species are globally threatened.

This list's taxonomic treatment (designation and sequence of orders, families and species) and nomenclature (common and scientific names) follow the conventions of The Clements Checklist of Birds of the World, 2022 edition. The family accounts at the beginning of each heading reflect this taxonomy, as do the species counts found in each family account. Introduced and accidental species are included in the total counts for Solomon Islands.

The following tags have been used to highlight several categories. The commonly occurring native species do not fall into any of these categories.

- (A) Accidental - a species that rarely or accidentally occurs in Solomon Islands
- (E) Endemic - a species endemic to Solomon Islands
- (I) Introduced - a species introduced to Solomon Islands as a consequence, direct or indirect, of human actions
- (Ext) Extinct - a species or subspecies that no longer exists.

== Ducks, geese, and waterfowl ==
Order: Anseriformes Family: Anatidae

Anatidae includes the ducks and most duck-like waterfowl, such as geese and swans. These birds are adapted to an aquatic existence with webbed feet, flattened bills, and feathers that are excellent at shedding water due to an oily coating.

- Plumed whistling duck, Dendrocygna eytoni (A)
- Pacific black duck, Anas superciliosa
- Gray teal, Anas gracilis

== Megapodes ==
Order: Galliformes Family: Megapodiidae

The Megapodiidae are stocky, medium-large chicken-like birds with small heads and large feet. All, but the malleefowl, occupy jungle habitats and most have brown or black colouring.

- Melanesian scrubfowl, Megapodius eremita

== Pheasants, grouse, and allies ==
Order: Galliformes Family: Phasianidae

The Phasianidae are a family of terrestrial birds which consists of quails, partridges, snowcocks, francolins, spurfowls, tragopans, monals, pheasants, peafowls, grouse, ptarmigan, and junglefowls. In general, they are plump (although they vary in size) and have broad, relatively short wings.

- Red junglefowl, Gallus gallus

== Grebes ==
Order: Podicipediformes Family: Podicipedidae

Grebes are small to medium-large freshwater diving birds. They have lobed toes and are excellent swimmers and divers. However, they have their feet placed far back on the body, making them quite ungainly on land.

- Little grebe, Tachybaptus ruficollis
- Australasian grebe, Tachybaptus novaehollandiae

== Pigeons and doves ==
Order: Columbiformes Family: Columbidae

Pigeons and doves are stout-bodied birds with short necks and short slender bills with a fleshy cere.

- Metallic pigeon, Columba vitiensis
- Yellow-legged pigeon, Columba pallidiceps
- MacKinlay's cuckoo-dove, Macropygia mackinlayi
- Crested cuckoo-dove, Reinwardtoena crassirostris (E)
- Pacific emerald dove, Chalcophaps longirostris
- Stephan's dove, Chalcophaps stephani
- Santa Cruz ground dove, Alopecoenas sanctaecrucis (E)
- Thick-billed ground dove, Alopecoenas salamonis (Ext)
- Bronze ground dove, Alopecoenas beccarii
- White-bibbed ground dove, Alopecoenas jobiensis
- Nicobar pigeon, Caloenas nicobarica
- Choiseul pigeon, Microgoura meeki (Ext)
- Superb fruit-dove, Ptilinopus superbus
- Silver-capped fruit-dove, Ptilinopus richardsii (E)
- Red-bellied fruit-dove, Ptilinopus greyi
- Yellow-bibbed fruit-dove, Ptilinopus solomonensis
- Claret-breasted fruit-dove, Ptilinopus viridis
- White-headed fruit-dove, Ptilinopus eugeniae (E)
- Pacific imperial-pigeon, Ducula pacifica
- Red-knobbed imperial-pigeon, Ducula rubricera
- Island imperial-pigeon, Ducula pistrinaria
- Chestnut-bellied imperial-pigeon, Ducula brenchleyi (E)
- Pale mountain-pigeon, Gymnophaps solomonensis (E)

== Cuckoos ==
Order: Cuculiformes Family: Cuculidae

The family Cuculidae includes cuckoos, roadrunners and anis. These birds are of variable size with slender bodies, long tails and strong legs. The Old World cuckoos are brood parasites.

- Buff-headed coucal, Centropus milo (E)
- Asian koel, Eudynamys scolopaceus
- Pacific koel, Eudynamys orientalis
- Long-tailed koel, Urodynamis taitensis
- Channel-billed cuckoo, Scythrops novaehollandiae
- Shining bronze-cuckoo, Chrysococcyx lucidus
- Fan-tailed cuckoo, Cacomantis flabelliformis
- Brush cuckoo, Cacomantis variolosus
- Himalayan cuckoo, Cuculus saturatus
- Oriental cuckoo, Cuculus optatus

== Frogmouths ==
Order: Caprimulgiformes Family: Podargidae

The frogmouths are a group of nocturnal birds related to the nightjars. They are named for their large flattened hooked bill and huge frog-like gape, which they use to take insects.

- Solomons frogmouth, Rigidipenna inexpectata (E)

== Nightjars and allies ==
Order: Caprimulgiformes Family: Caprimulgidae

Nightjars are medium-sized nocturnal birds that usually nest on the ground. They have long wings, short legs and very short bills. Most have small feet, of little use for walking, and long pointed wings. Their soft plumage is camouflaged to resemble bark or leaves.

- Solomons nightjar, Eurostopodus nigripennis (E)
- White-throated nightjar, Eurostopodus mystacalis

== Swifts ==
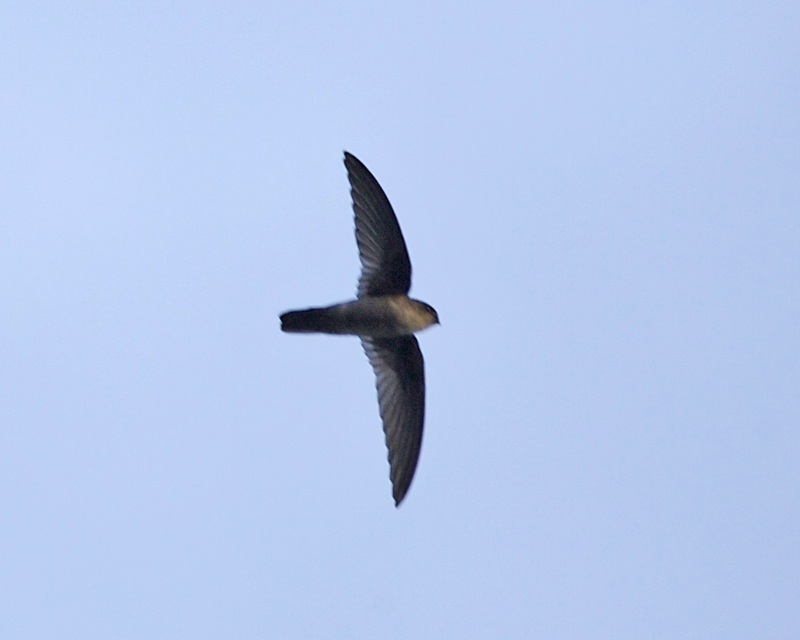
Uniform swiftlet

Order: Caprimulgiformes Family: Apodidae

Swifts are small birds which spend the majority of their lives flying. These birds have very short legs and never settle voluntarily on the ground, perching instead only on vertical surfaces. Many swifts have long swept-back wings which resemble a crescent or boomerang.

- Glossy swiftlet, Collocalia esculenta
- Satin swiftlet, Collocalia uropygialis
- White-rumped swiftlet, Aerodramus spodiopygius
- Australian swiftlet, Aerodramus terraereginae
- Mayr's swiftlet, Aerodramus orientalis
- Uniform swiftlet, Aerodramus vanikorensis
- Pacific swift, Apus pacificus

== Treeswifts ==
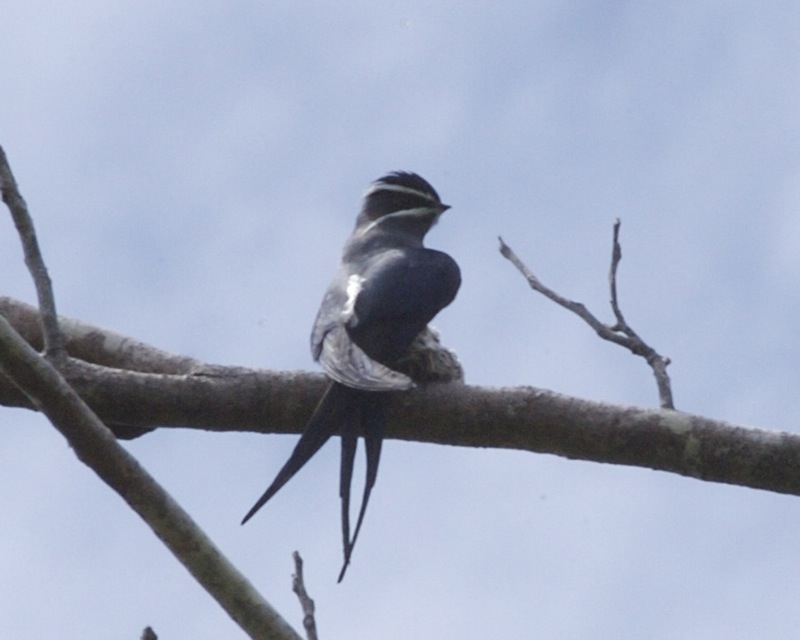
Moustached treeswift

Order: Caprimulgiformes Family: Hemiprocnidae

The treeswifts, also called crested swifts, are closely related to the true swifts. They differ from the other swifts in that they have crests, long forked tails and softer plumage.

- Moustached treeswift, Hemiprocne mystacea

== Rails, gallinules, and coots ==
Order: Gruiformes Family: Rallidae

Rallidae is a large family of small to medium-sized birds which includes the rails, crakes, coots and gallinules. Typically they inhabit dense vegetation in damp environments near lakes, swamps or rivers. In general they are shy and secretive birds, making them difficult to observe. Most species have strong legs and long toes which are well adapted to soft uneven surfaces. They tend to have short, rounded wings and to be weak fliers.

- Buff-banded rail, Gallirallus philippensis
- Woodford's rail, Gallirallus woodfordi (E)
- Roviana rail, Gallirallus rovianae (E)
- Makira moorhen, Gallinula silvestris (E)
- Dusky moorhen, Gallinula tenebrosa
- Black-backed swamphen, Porphyrio indicus
- Australasian swamphen, Porphyrio melanotus
- Pale-vented bush-hen, Amaurornis moluccana
- White-browed crake, Poliolimnas cinereus
- Spotless crake, Zapornia tabuensis

== Thick-knees ==
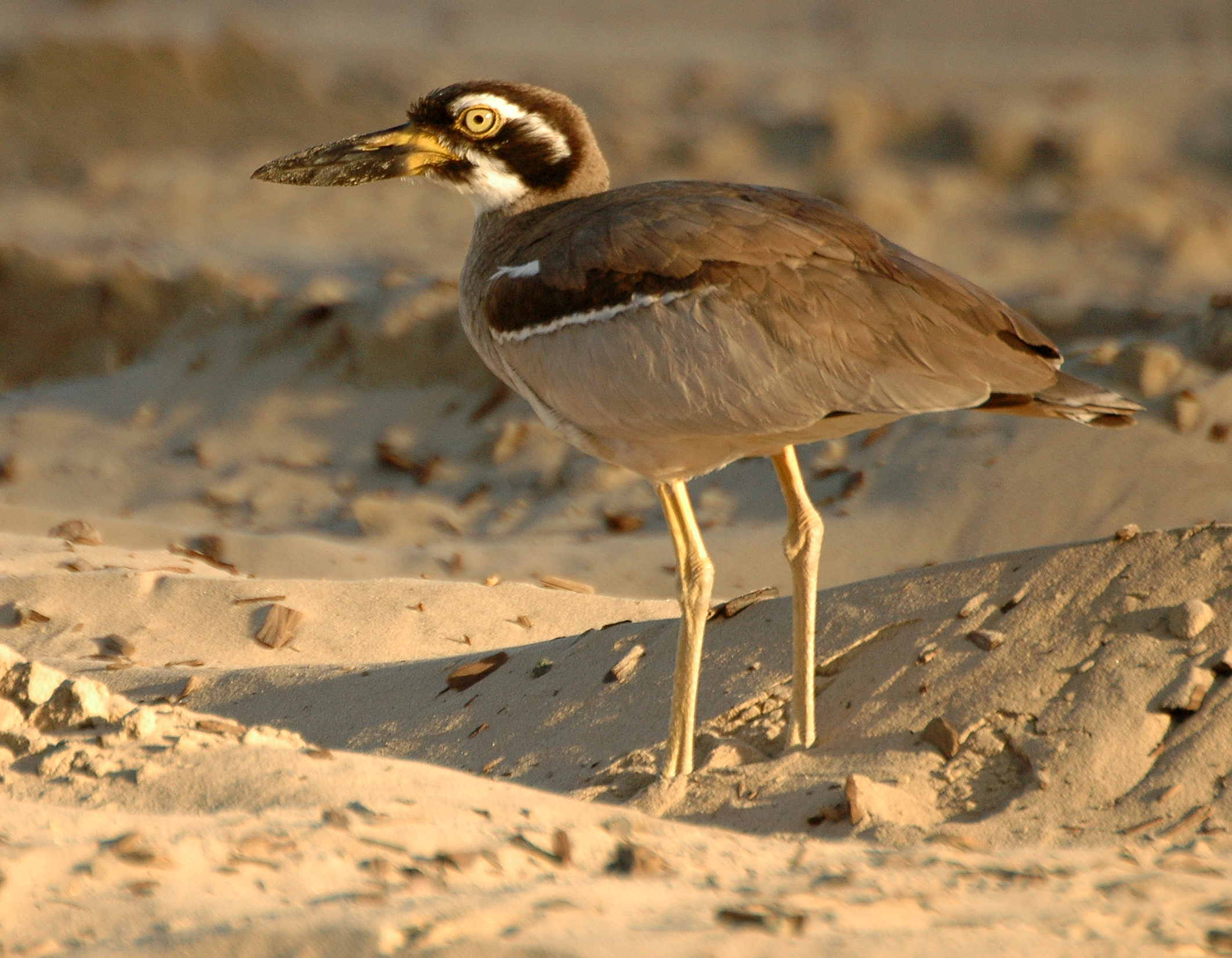
Beach thick-knee

Order: Charadriiformes Family: Burhinidae

The thick-knees are a group of largely tropical waders in the family Burhinidae. They are found worldwide within the tropical zone, with some species also breeding in temperate Europe and Australia. They are medium to large waders with strong black or yellow-black bills, large yellow eyes and cryptic plumage. Despite being classed as waders, most species have a preference for arid or semi-arid habitats.

- Beach thick-knee, Esacus magnirostris

== Stilts and avocets ==
Order: Charadriiformes Family: Recurvirostridae

Recurvirostridae is a family of large wading birds, which includes the avocets and stilts. The avocets have long legs and long up-curved bills. The stilts have extremely long legs and long, thin, straight bills.

- Black-winged stilt, Himantopus himantopus
- Pied stilt, Himantopus leucocephalus
- Black-necked stilt, Himantopus mexicanus (A)

== Plovers and lapwings ==
Order: Charadriiformes Family: Charadriidae

The family Charadriidae includes the plovers, dotterels and lapwings. They are small to medium-sized birds with compact bodies, short, thick necks and long, usually pointed, wings. They are found in open country worldwide, mostly in habitats near water.

- Black-bellied plover, Pluvialis squatarola
- Pacific golden-plover, Pluvialis fulva
- Masked lapwing, Vanellus miles
- Lesser sand-plover, Charadrius mongolus
- Greater sand-plover, Charadrius leschenaultii
- Oriental plover, Charadrius veredus

== Sandpipers and allies ==
Order: Charadriiformes Family: Scolopacidae

Scolopacidae is a large diverse family of small to medium-sized shorebirds including the sandpipers, curlews, godwits, shanks, tattlers, woodcocks, snipes, dowitchers and phalaropes. The majority of these species eat small invertebrates picked out of the mud or soil. Variation in length of legs and bills enables multiple species to feed in the same habitat, particularly on the coast, without direct competition for food.

- Bristle-thighed curlew, Numenius tahitiensis
- Whimbrel, Numenius phaeopus
- Little curlew, Numenius minutus
- Far Eastern curlew, Numenius madagascariensis
- Bar-tailed godwit, Limosa lapponica
- Black-tailed godwit, Limosa limosa
- Ruddy turnstone, Arenaria interpres
- Great knot, Calidris tenuirostris (A)
- Red knot, Calidris canutus
- Broad-billed sandpiper, Calidris falcinellus (A)
- Sharp-tailed sandpiper, Calidris acuminata
- Curlew sandpiper, Calidris ferruginea
- Long-toed stint, Calidris subminuta
- Red-necked stint, Calidris ruficollis
- Sanderling, Calidris alba
- Pectoral sandpiper, Calidris melanotos (A)
- Asian dowitcher, Limnodromus semipalmatus
- Swinhoe's snipe, Gallinago megala
- Terek sandpiper, Xenus cinereus
- Common sandpiper, Actitis hypoleucos
- Gray-tailed tattler, Tringa brevipes
- Wandering tattler, Tringa incana
- Common greenshank, Tringa nebularia
- Marsh sandpiper, Tringa stagnatilis

== Buttonquail ==
Order: Charadriiformes Family: Turnicidae

The buttonquail are small, drab, running birds which resemble the true quails. The female is the brighter of the sexes and initiates courtship. The male incubates the eggs and tends the young.

- Red-backed buttonquail, Turnix maculosus

== Pratincoles and coursers ==
Order: Charadriiformes Family: Glareolidae

Glareolidae is a family of wading birds comprising the pratincoles, which have short legs, long pointed wings and long forked tails, and the coursers, which have long legs, short wings and long pointed bills which curve downwards.

- Oriental pratincole, Glareola maldivarum (A)

== Skuas and jaegers ==
Order: Charadriiformes Family: Stercorariidae

The family Stercorariidae are, in general, medium to large birds, typically with grey or brown plumage, often with white markings on the wings. They nest on the ground in temperate and arctic regions and are long-distance migrants.

- South polar skua, Stercorarius maccormicki
- Brown skua, Stercorarius antarcticus
- Pomarine jaeger, Stercorarius pomarinus
- Parasitic jaeger, Stercorarius parasiticus
- Long-tailed jaeger, Stercorarius longicaudus (A)

== Gulls, terns, and skimmers ==
Order: Charadriiformes Family: Laridae

Laridae is a family of medium to large seabirds, the gulls, terns, and skimmers. Gulls are typically grey or white, often with black markings on the head or wings. They have stout, longish bills and webbed feet. Terns are a group of generally medium to large seabirds typically with grey or white plumage, often with black markings on the head. Most terns hunt fish by diving but some pick insects off the surface of fresh water. Terns are generally long-lived birds, with several species known to live in excess of 30 years.

- Brown noddy, Anous stolidus
- Black noddy, Anous minutus
- White tern, Gygis alba
- Sooty tern, Onychoprion fuscatus
- Gray-backed tern, Onychoprion lunatus
- Bridled tern, Onychoprion anaethetus
- Little tern, Sternula albifrons
- Gull-billed tern, Gelochelidon nilotica
- White-winged tern, Chlidonias leucopterus
- Roseate tern, Sterna dougallii
- White-fronted tern, Sterna striata
- Black-naped tern, Sterna sumatrana
- Common tern, Sterna hirundo
- Great crested tern, Thalasseus bergii
- Lesser crested tern, Thalasseus bengalensis (A)

== Tropicbirds ==
Order: Phaethontiformes Family: Phaethontidae

Tropicbirds are slender white birds of tropical oceans, with exceptionally long central tail feathers. Their heads and long wings have black markings.

- White-tailed tropicbird, Phaethon lepturus (A)
- Red-tailed tropicbird, Phaethon rubricauda (A)

== Albatrosses ==
Order: Procellariiformes Family: Diomedeidae

The albatrosses are a family of large seabird found across the Southern and North Pacific Oceans. The largest are among the largest flying birds in the world.

- Black-browed albatross, Thalassarche melanophris (A)

== Southern storm-petrels ==
Order: Procellariiformes Family: Oceanitidae

The southern storm-petrels are relatives of the petrels and are the smallest seabirds. They feed on planktonic crustaceans and small fish picked from the surface, typically while hovering. The flight is fluttering and sometimes bat-like.

- Wilson's storm-petrel, Oceanites oceanicus (A)
- Black-bellied storm-petrel, Fregetta tropica (A)
- Polynesian storm-petrel, Nesofregetta fuliginosa (A)

== Northern storm-petrels ==
Order: Procellariiformes Family: Hydrobatidae

Though the members of this family are similar in many respects to the southern storm-petrels, including their general appearance and habits, there are enough genetic differences to warrant their placement in a separate family.

- Band-rumped storm-petrel, Hydrobates castro (A)

== Shearwaters and petrels ==
Order: Procellariiformes Family: Procellariidae

The procellariids are the main group of medium-sized "true petrels", characterised by united nostrils with medium septum and a long outer functional primary.

- Herald petrel, Pterodroma heraldica (A)
- Mottled petrel, Pterodroma inexpectata
- Juan Fernandez petrel, Pterodroma externa (A)
- White-necked petrel, Pterodroma cervicalis
- Gould's petrel, Pterodroma leucoptera (A)
- Collared petrel, Pterodroma brevipes
- Vanuatu petrel, Pterodroma occulta (A)
- Bulwer's petrel, Bulweria bulwerii (A)
- Tahiti petrel, Pseudobulweria rostrata (A)
- Beck's petrel, Pseudobulweria becki (A)
- Streaked shearwater, Calonectris leucomelas (A)
- Flesh-footed shearwater, Ardenna carneipes (A)
- Wedge-tailed shearwater, Ardenna pacificus
- Sooty shearwater, Ardenna griseus
- Short-tailed shearwater, Ardenna tenuirostris (A)
- Christmas shearwater, Puffinus nativitatis
- Fluttering shearwater, Puffinus gavia (A)
- Tropical shearwater, Puffinus bailloni
- Heinroth's shearwater, Puffinus heinrothi

== Frigatebirds ==
Order: Suliformes Family: Fregatidae

Frigatebirds are large seabirds usually found over tropical oceans. They are large, black and white or completely black, with long wings and deeply forked tails. The males have coloured inflatable throat pouches. They do not swim or walk and cannot take off from a flat surface. Having the largest wingspan-to-body-weight ratio of any bird, they are essentially aerial, able to stay aloft for more than a week.

- Lesser frigatebird, Fregata ariel
- Christmas Island frigatebird, Fregata andrewsi
- Great frigatebird, Fregata minor

== Boobies and gannets ==
Order: Suliformes Family: Sulidae

The sulids comprise the gannets and boobies. Both groups are medium to large coastal seabirds that plunge-dive for fish.

- Masked booby, Sula dactylatra (A)
- Brown booby, Sula leucogaster
- Red-footed booby, Sula sula

== Cormorants and shags ==
Order: Suliformes Family: Phalacrocoracidae

Phalacrocoracidae is a family of medium to large coastal, fish-eating seabirds that includes cormorants and shags. Plumage colouration varies, with the majority having mainly dark plumage, some species being black-and-white and a few being colourful.

- Little pied cormorant, Microcarbo melanoleucos
- Great cormorant, Phalacrocorax carbo (A)
- Little black cormorant, Phalacrocorax sulcirostris (A)

== Pelicans ==
Order: Pelecaniformes Family: Pelecanidae

Pelicans are large water birds with a distinctive pouch under their beak. As with other members of the order Pelecaniformes, they have webbed feet with four toes.

- Australian pelican, Pelecanus conspicillatus (A)

== Herons, egrets, and bitterns ==
Order: Pelecaniformes Family: Ardeidae

The family Ardeidae contains the bitterns, herons and egrets. Herons and egrets are medium to large wading birds with long necks and legs. Bitterns tend to be shorter necked and more wary. Members of Ardeidae fly with their necks retracted, unlike other long-necked birds such as storks, ibises and spoonbills.

- Yellow bittern, Ixobrychus sinensis
- Black bittern, Ixobrychus flavicollis
- Great egret, Ardea alba
- Intermediate egret, Ardea intermedia (A)
- White-faced heron, Egretta novaehollandiae (A)
- Little egret, Egretta garzetta (A)
- Pacific reef-heron, Egretta sacra
- Cattle egret, Bubulcus ibis (A)
- Striated heron, Butorides striata
- Nankeen night-heron, Nycticorax caledonicus

== Ibises and spoonbills ==
Order: Pelecaniformes Family: Threskiornithidae

Threskiornithidae is a family of large terrestrial and wading birds which includes the ibises and spoonbills. They have long, broad wings with 11 primary and about 20 secondary feathers. They are strong fliers and despite their size and weight, very capable soarers.

- Glossy ibis, Plegadis falcinellus (A)
- Australian ibis, Threskiornis moluccus
- Royal spoonbill, Platalea regia

== Osprey ==
Order: Accipitriformes Family: Pandionidae

The family Pandionidae contains only one species, the osprey. The osprey is a medium-large raptor which is a specialist fish-eater with a worldwide distribution.

- Osprey, Pandion haliaetus

== Hawks, eagles, and kites ==
Order: Accipitriformes Family: Accipitridae

Accipitridae is a family of birds of prey, which includes hawks, eagles, kites, harriers and Old World vultures. These birds have powerful hooked beaks for tearing flesh from their prey, strong legs, powerful talons and keen eyesight.

- Pacific baza, Aviceda subcristata
- Swamp harrier, Circus approximans
- Variable goshawk, Accipiter hiogaster
- Gray goshawk, Accipiter novaehollandiae
- Brown goshawk, Accipiter fasciatus
- Pied goshawk, Accipiter albogularis
- Imitator sparrowhawk, Accipiter imitator (E)
- Meyer's goshawk, Accipiter meyerianus
- Brahminy kite, Haliastur indus
- White-bellied sea-eagle, Haliaeetus leucogaster
- Sanford's sea-eagle, Haliaeetus sanfordi (E)

== Barn-owls ==
Order: Strigiformes Family: Tytonidae

Barn-owls are medium to large owls with large heads and characteristic heart-shaped faces. They have long strong legs with powerful talons.

- Eastern barn owl, Tyto javanica

== Owls ==
Order: Strigiformes Family: Strigidae

The typical owls are small to large solitary nocturnal birds of prey. They have large forward-facing eyes and ears, a hawk-like beak and a conspicuous circle of feathers around each eye called a facial disk.

- Fearful owl, Nesasio solomonensis (E)
- West Solomons owl, Athene jacquinoti (E)
- Guadalcanal owl, Athene malaitae (E)
- Makira owl, Athene roseoaxillaris (E)
- Malaita owl, Athene granti (E)

== Hornbills ==
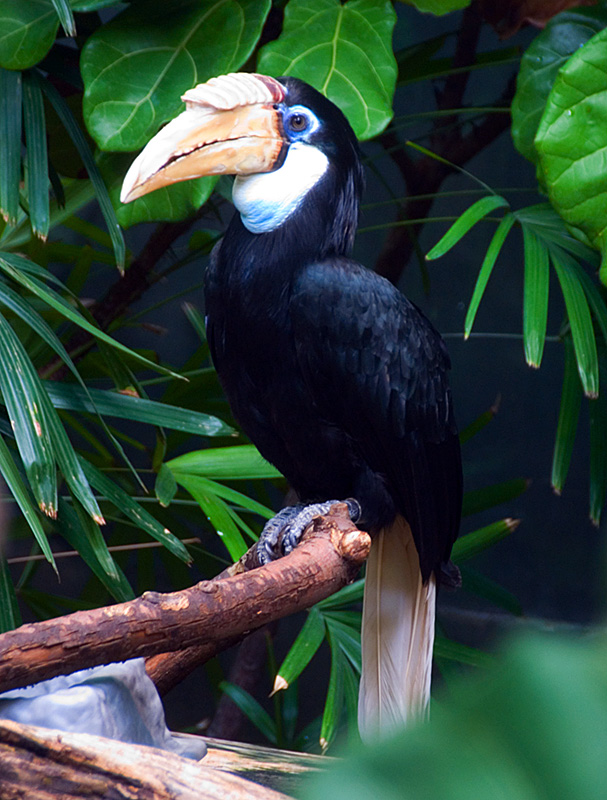
Blyth's hornbill

Order: Bucerotiformes Family: Bucerotidae

Hornbills are a group of birds whose bill is shaped like a cow's horn, but without a twist, sometimes with a casque on the upper mandible. Frequently, the bill is brightly coloured.

- Blyth's hornbill, Rhyticeros plicatus

== Kingfishers ==
Order: Coraciiformes Family: Alcedinidae

Kingfishers, a family which includes the kookaburras, have large bills, very short legs and often brilliantly coloured plumage. The group includes three subfamilies, two of which have representatives in the Solomon Islands. The woodland species are not always closely associated with water. They pursue small animal prey of all kinds in forest and woodland habitats. The river kingfishers are usually found close to water, and hunt small fish and similar aquatic prey by diving, either from a branch or from the air. Both types dig their own nest holes, frequently in an earth bank, a rotted stump or a termite nest.

- Common kingfisher, Alcedo atthis
- Little kingfisher, Ceyx pusillus
- New Georgia dwarf-kingfisher, Ceyx collectoris (E)
- North Solomons dwarf-kingfisher, Ceyx meeki (E)
- Malaita dwarf-kingfisher, Ceyx malaitae (E)
- Guadalcanal dwarf-kingfisher, Ceyx nigromaxilla (E)
- Makira dwarf-kingfisher, Ceyx gentianus (E)
- Forest kingfisher, Todirhamphus macleayii
- Ultramarine kingfisher, Todirhamphus leucopygius (E)
- Pacific kingfisher, Todirhamphus sacer
- Colonist kingfisher, Todirhamphus colonus
- Sacred kingfisher, Todirhamphus sanctus
- Collared kingfisher, Todirhamphus chloris
- Beach kingfisher, Todirhamphus saurophagus
- Melanesian kingfisher, Todirhamphus tristrami
- Moustached kingfisher, Actenoides bougainvillei (E)

== Rollers ==
Order: Coraciiformes Family: Coraciidae

Rollers resemble crows in size and build, but are more closely related to the kingfishers and bee-eaters. They share the colourful appearance of those groups with blues and browns predominating. The two inner front toes are connected, but the outer toe is not.

- Dollarbird, Eurystomus orientalis

== Falcons and caracaras ==
Order: Falconiformes Family: Falconidae

Falconidae is a family of diurnal birds of prey. They differ from hawks, eagles and kites in that they kill with their beaks instead of their talons.

- Oriental hobby, Falco severus
- Australian hobby, Falco longipennis (A)
- Peregrine falcon, Falco peregrinus

== Cockatoos ==
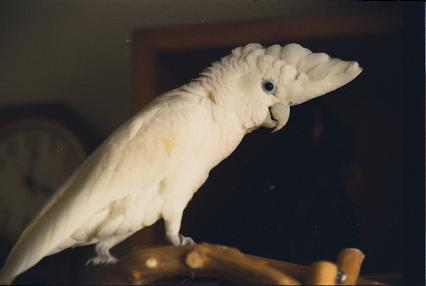
Ducorps' cockatoo

Order: Psittaciformes Family: Cacatuidae

The cockatoos share many features with other parrots including the characteristic curved beak shape and a zygodactyl foot, with two forward toes and two backwards toes. They differ, however in a number of characteristics, including the often spectacular movable headcrest.

- Ducorps's cockatoo, Cacatua ducorpsii (E)

== Old World parrots ==
Order: Psittaciformes Family: Psittaculidae

Characteristic features of parrots include a strong curved bill, an upright stance, strong legs, and clawed zygodactyl feet. Many parrots are vividly coloured, and some are multi-coloured. In size they range from 8 cm (3.1 in) to 1 m (3.3 ft) in length. Old World parrots are found from Africa east across south and southeast Asia and Oceania to Australia and New Zealand.

- Red-breasted pygmy-parrot, Micropsitta bruijnii
- Finsch's pygmy-parrot, Micropsitta finschii
- Eclectus parrot, Eclectus roratus
- Singing parrot, Geoffroyus heteroclitus
- Palm lorikeet, Vini palmarum
- Meek's lorikeet, Vini meeki (E)
- Red-flanked lorikeet, Hypocharmosyna placentis
- Duchess lorikeet, Charmosynoides margarethae (E)
- Cardinal lory, Pseudeos cardinalis
- Yellow-bibbed lory, Lorius chlorocercus (E)
- Coconut lorikeet, Trichoglossus haematodus
- Rainbow lorikeet, Trichoglossus moluccanus

== Pittas ==
Order: Passeriformes Family: Pittidae

Pittas are medium-sized by passerine standards and are stocky, with fairly long, strong legs, short tails and stout bills. Many are brightly coloured. They spend the majority of their time on wet forest floors, eating snails, insects and similar invertebrates.

- Black-faced pitta, Pitta anerythra (E)

== Honeyeaters ==
Order: Passeriformes Family: Meliphagidae

The honeyeaters are a large and diverse family of small to medium-sized birds most common in Australia and New Guinea. They are nectar feeders and closely resemble other nectar-feeding passerines.

- Noisy miner, Manorina melanocephala (I)
- Cardinal myzomela, Myzomela cardinalis
- Scarlet-naped myzomela, Myzomela lafargei (E)
- Yellow-vented myzomela, Myzomela eichhorni (E)
- Red-bellied myzomela, Myzomela malaitae (E)
- Black-headed myzomela, Myzomela melanocephala (E)
- Sooty myzomela, Myzomela tristrami
- Makira honeyeater, Meliarchus sclateri (E)
- Guadalcanal honeyeater, Guadalcanaria inexpectata (E)

== Thornbills and allies ==
Order: Passeriformes Family: Acanthizidae

Thornbills are small passerine birds, similar in habits to the tits.

- Gray thornbill, Acanthiza cinerea
- Rennell gerygone, Gerygone citrina (E)

== Cuckooshrikes ==
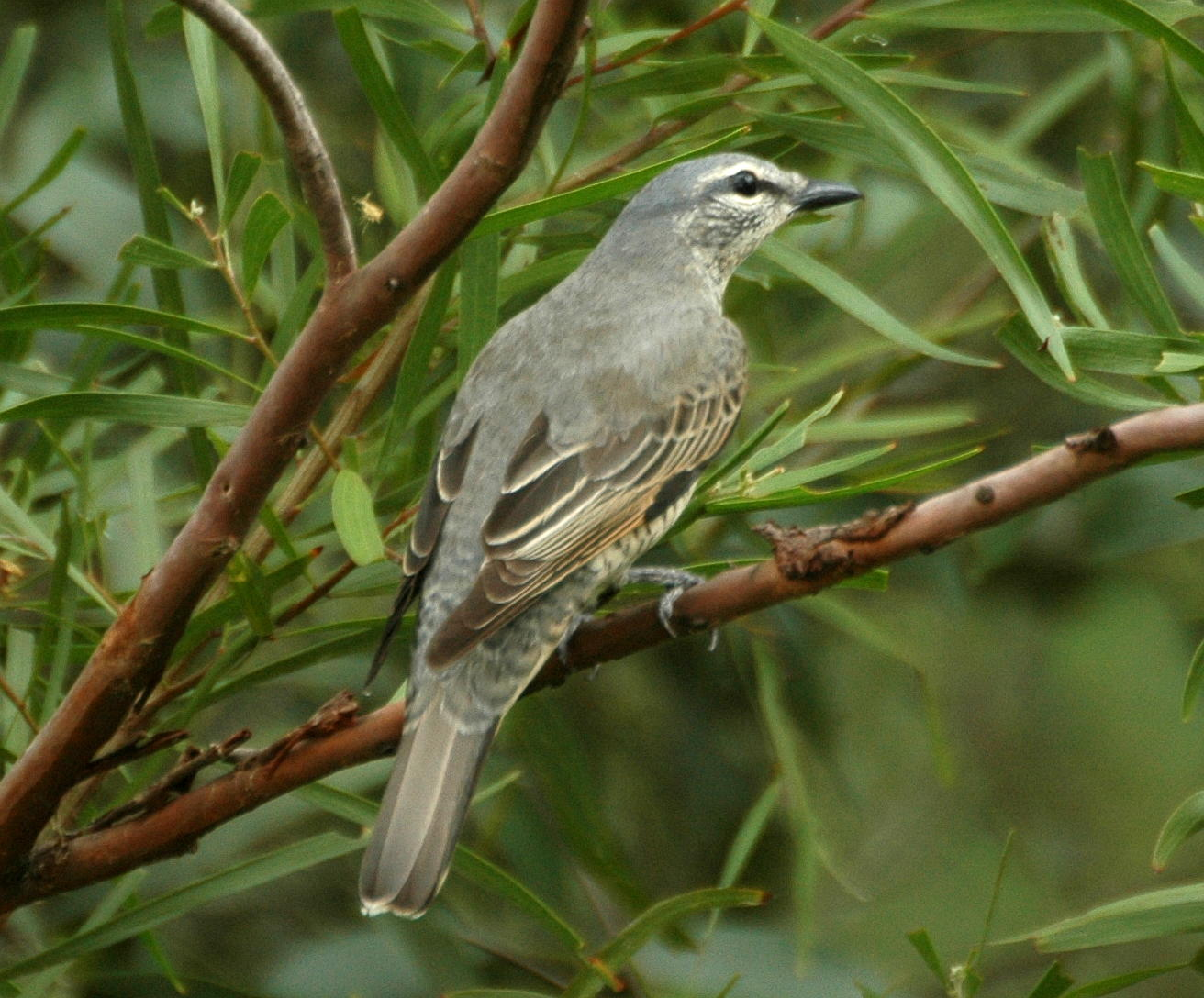
Common cicadabird

Order: Passeriformes Family: Campephagidae

The cuckooshrikes are small to medium-sized passerine birds. They are predominantly greyish with white and black, although some species are brightly coloured.

- Barred cuckooshrike, Coracina lineata
- Black-faced cuckooshrike, Coracina novaehollandiae
- North Melanesian cuckooshrike, Coracina welchmani
- White-bellied cuckooshrike, Coracina papuensis
- South Melanesian cuckooshrike, Coracina caledonica
- Polynesian triller, Lalage maculosa
- Long-tailed triller, Lalage leucopyga
- Makira cicadabird, Edolisoma salomonis (E)
- Solomons cuckooshrike, Edolisoma holopolium (E)
- Common cicadabird, Edolisoma tenuirostre

== Whistlers and allies ==
Order: Passeriformes Family: Pachycephalidae

The family Pachycephalidae includes the whistlers, shrikethrushes, and some of the pitohuis.

- Guadalcanal hooded whistler, Pachycephala implicata (E)
- Bougainville hooded whistler, Pachycephala richardsi (E)
- Temotu whistler, Pachycephala vanikorensis (E)
- Oriole whistler, Pachycephala orioloides (E)
- Rennell whistler, Pachycephala feminina (E)
- Black-tailed whistler, Pachycephala melanura

== Woodswallows, bellmagpies, and allies ==
Order: Passeriformes Family: Artamidae

The woodswallows are soft-plumaged, somber-coloured passerine birds. They are smooth, agile flyers with moderately large, semi-triangular wings. The cracticids: currawongs, bellmagpies and butcherbirds, are similar to the other corvids. They have large, straight bills and mostly black, white or grey plumage. All are omnivorous to some degree.

- Australian magpie, Gymnorhina tibicen (I)

== Fantails ==
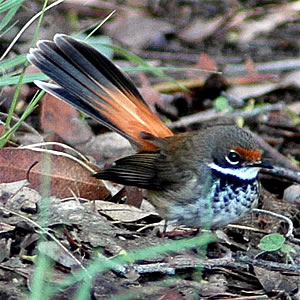
Rufous fantail

Order: Passeriformes Family: Rhipiduridae

The fantails are small insectivorous birds which are specialist aerial feeders.

- Cockerell's fantail, Rhipidura cockerelli (E)
- Willie-wagtail, Rhipidura leucophrys
- Malaita fantail, Rhipidura malaitae (E)
- Rufous fantail, Rhipidura rufifrons
- Brown fantail, Rhipidura drownei (E)
- Dusky fantail, Rhipidura tenebrosa (E)
- Rennell fantail, Rhipidura rennelliana (E)
- Gray fantail, Rhipidura albiscapa
- New Zealand fantail, Rhipidura fuliginosa

== Drongos ==
Order: Passeriformes Family: Dicruridae

The drongos are mostly black or dark grey in colour, sometimes with metallic tints. They have long forked tails, and some Asian species have elaborate tail decorations. They have short legs and sit very upright when perched, like a shrike. They flycatch or take prey from the ground.

- Hair-crested drongo, Dicrurus hottentottus
- Spangled drongo, Dicrurus bracteatus

== Monarch flycatchers ==
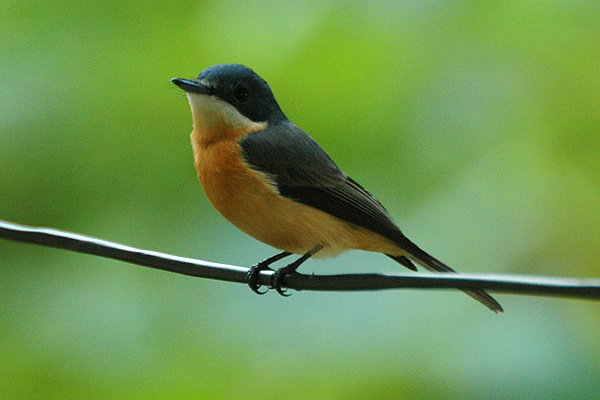
Vanikoro flycatcher

Order: Passeriformes Family: Monarchidae

The monarch flycatchers are small to medium-sized insectivorous passerines which hunt by flycatching.

- Vanikoro monarch, Mayrornis schistaceus (E)
- Rennell shrikebill, Clytorhynchus hamlini (E)
- Santa Cruz shrikebill, Clytorhynchus sanctaecrucis (E)
- Island monarch, Monarcha cinerascens
- White-capped monarch, Monarcha richardsii (E)
- Chestnut-bellied monarch, Monarcha castaneiventris (E)
- Bougainville monarch, Monarcha erythrostictus (E)
- Black-and-white monarch, Symposiachrus barbatus (E)
- Kolombangara monarch, Symposiachrus browni (E)
- White-collared monarch, Symposiachrus viduus (E)
- Steel-blue flycatcher, Myiagra ferrocyanea (E)
- Ochre-headed flycatcher, Myiagra cervinicauda (E)
- Melanesian flycatcher, Myiagra caledonica
- Vanikoro flycatcher, Myiagra vanikorensis

== Crows, jays, and magpies ==
Order: Passeriformes Family: Corvidae

The family Corvidae includes crows, ravens, jays, choughs, magpies, treepies, nutcrackers and ground jays. Corvids are above average in size among the Passeriformes, and some of the larger species show high levels of intelligence. There are 2 species which occur in the Solomon Islands.

- Guadalcanal crow, Corvus woodfordi (E)
- Bougainville crow, Corvus meeki

== Australasian robins ==
Order: Passeriformes Family: Petroicidae

Most species of Petroicidae have a stocky build with a large rounded head, a short straight bill and rounded wingtips. They occupy a wide range of wooded habitats, from subalpine to tropical rainforest and mangrove swamp to semi-arid scrubland. All are primarily insectivores, although a few supplement their diet with seeds.

- Pacific robin, Petroica pusilla

== Reed warblers and allies ==
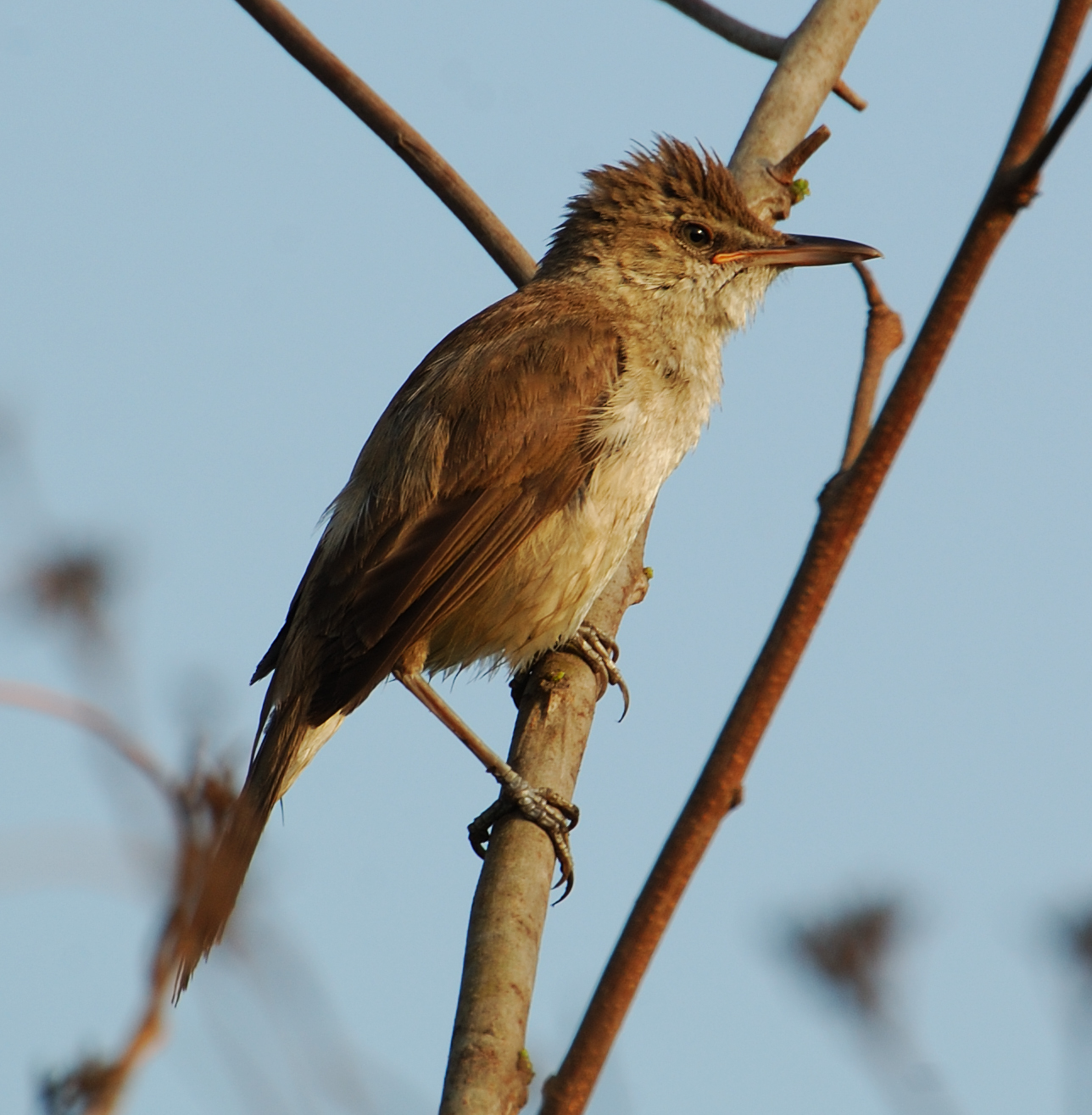
Clamorous reed warbler

Order: Passeriformes Family: Acrocephalidae

The members of this family are usually rather large for "warblers". Most are rather plain olivaceous brown above with much yellow to beige below. They are usually found in open woodland, reedbeds, or tall grass. The family occurs mostly in southern to western Eurasia and surroundings, but it also ranges far into the Pacific, with some species in Africa.

- Clamorous reed warbler, Acrocephalus stentoreus
- Australian reed warbler, Acrocephalus australis

== Grassbirds and allies ==
Order: Passeriformes Family: Locustellidae

Locustellidae are a family of small insectivorous songbirds found mainly in Eurasia, Africa, and the Australian region. They are smallish birds with tails that are usually long and pointed, and tend to be drab brownish or buffy all over.

- Guadalcanal thicketbird, Megalurulus whitneyi (E)

== Swallows ==
Order: Passeriformes Family: Hirundinidae

The family Hirundinidae is adapted to aerial feeding. They have a slender streamlined body, long pointed wings and a short bill with a wide gape. The feet are adapted to perching rather than walking, and the front toes are partially joined at the base.

- Pacific swallow, Hirundo tahitica
- Tree martin, Petrochelidon nigricans

== Leaf warblers ==
Order: Passeriformes Family: Phylloscopidae

Leaf warblers are a family of small insectivorous birds found mostly in Eurasia and ranging into Wallacea and Africa. The species are of various sizes, often green-plumaged above and yellow below, or more subdued with greyish-green to greyish-brown colours.

- Mountain leaf warbler, Phylloscopus trivirgatus
- Makira leaf warbler, Phylloscopus makirensis (E)
- Island leaf warbler, Phylloscopus poliocephalus
- Kolombangara leaf warbler, Phylloscopus amoenus (E)

== Bush warblers and allies ==
Order: Passeriformes Family: Scotocercidae

The members of this family are found throughout Africa, Asia, and Polynesia. Their taxonomy is in flux, and some authorities place some genera in other families.

- Shade warbler, Horornis parens (E)

== White-eyes, yuhinas, and allies ==
Order: Passeriformes Family: Zosteropidae

The white-eyes are small and mostly undistinguished, their plumage above being generally some dull colour like greenish-olive, but some species have a white or bright yellow throat, breast or lower parts, and several have buff flanks. As their name suggests, many species have a white ring around each eye.

- Bare-eyed white-eye, Zosterops superciliosus (E)
- Sanford's white-eye, Zosterops lacertosus (E)
- Rennell white-eye, Zosterops rennellianus (E)
- Banded white-eye, Zosterops vellalavella (E)
- Ganongga white-eye, Zosterops splendidus (E)
- Splendid white-eye, Zosterops luteirostris (E)
- Yellow-throated white-eye, Zosterops metcalfii (E)
- Solomons white-eye, Zosterops kulambangrae (E)
- Dark-eyed white-eye, Zosterops tetiparius (E)
- Kolombangara white-eye, Zosterops murphyi (E)
- Grey-throated white-eye, Zosterops rendovae (E)
- Malaita white-eye, Zosterops stresemanni (E)
- Santa Cruz white-eye, Zosterops santaecrucis (E)
- Vanikoro white-eye, Zosterops gibbsi (E)

== Starlings ==
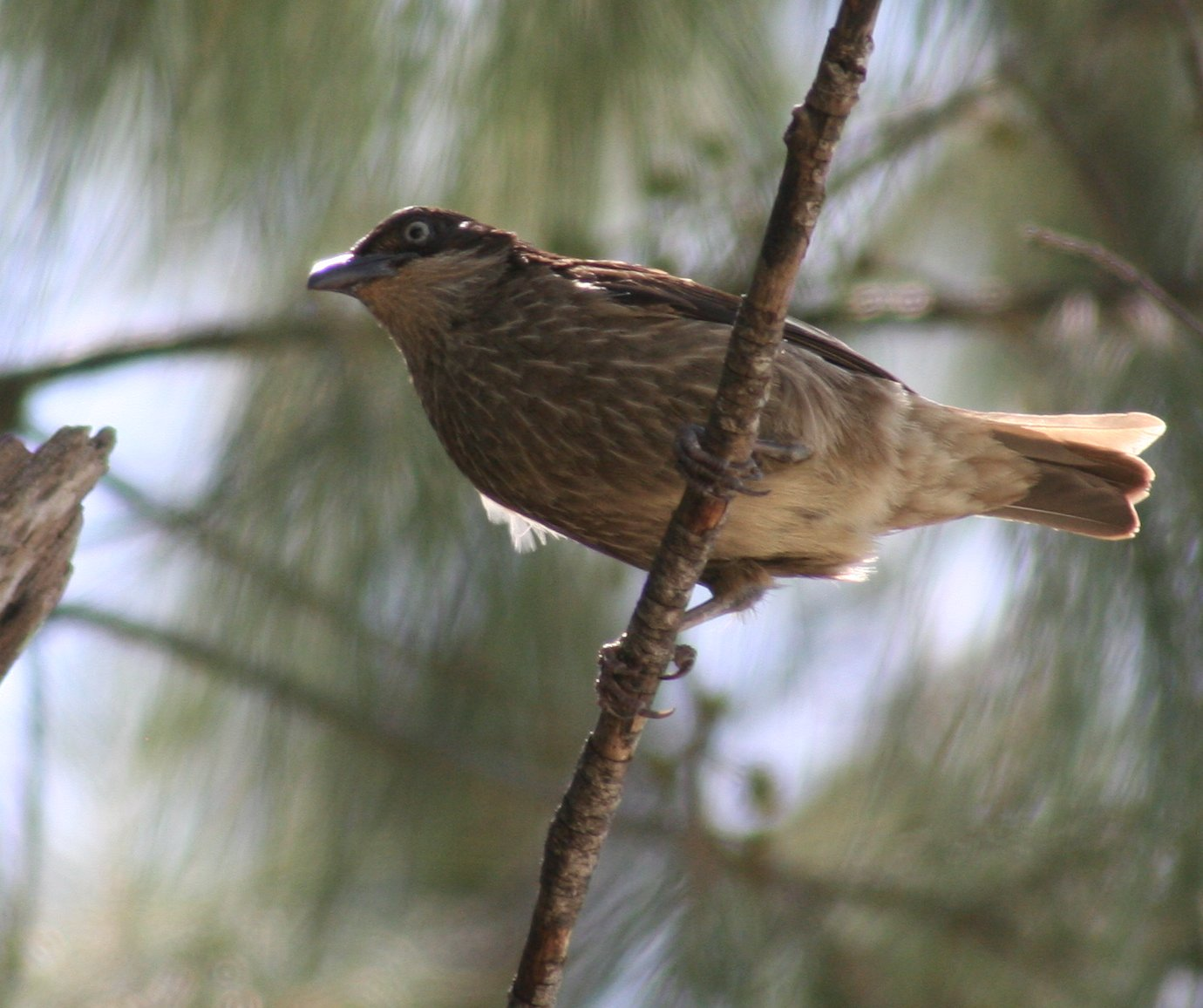
Polynesian starling

Order: Passeriformes Family: Sturnidae

Starlings are small to medium-sized passerine birds. Their flight is strong and direct and they are very gregarious. Their preferred habitat is fairly open country. They eat insects and fruit. Plumage is typically dark with a metallic sheen.

- Metallic starling, Aplonis metallica
- Atoll starling, Aplonis feadensis
- Rennell starling, Aplonis insularis (E)
- White-eyed starling, Aplonis brunneicapillus (E)
- Brown-winged starling, Aplonis grandis (E)
- Makira starling, Aplonis dichroa (E)
- Rusty-winged starling, Aplonis zelandica
- Singing starling, Aplonis cantoroides
- Polynesian starling, Aplonis tabuensis
- Yellow-faced myna, Mino dumontii
- Long-tailed myna, Mino kreffti
- Common myna, Acridotheres tristis (I)

== Thrushes and allies ==
Order: Passeriformes Family: Turdidae

The thrushes are a group of passerine birds that occur mainly in the Old World. They are plump, soft plumaged, small to medium-sized insectivores or sometimes omnivores, often feeding on the ground. Many have attractive songs.

- Makira thrush, Zoothera margaretae (E)
- Guadalcanal thrush, Zoothera turipavae (E)
- Bassian thrush, Zoothera lunulata
- Russet-tailed thrush, Zoothera heinei
- Island thrush, Turdus poliocephalus

== Flowerpeckers ==
Order: Passeriformes Family: Dicaeidae

The flowerpeckers are very small, stout, often brightly coloured birds, with short tails, short thick curved bills and tubular tongues.

- Midget flowerpecker, Dicaeum aeneum (E)
- Mottled flowerpecker, Dicaeum tristrami (E)

== Sunbirds and spiderhunters ==
Order: Passeriformes Family: Nectariniidae

The sunbirds and spiderhunters are very small passerine birds which feed largely on nectar, although they will also take insects, especially when feeding young. Flight is fast and direct on their short wings. Most species can take nectar by hovering like a hummingbird, but usually perch to feed.

- Olive-backed sunbird, Cinnyris jugularis

== Waxbills and allies ==
Order: Passeriformes Family: Estrildidae

The estrildid finches are small passerine birds of the Old World tropics and Australasia. They are gregarious and often colonial seed eaters with short thick but pointed bills. They are all similar in structure and habits, but have wide variation in plumage colours and patterns.

- Blue-faced parrotfinch, Erythrura trichroa

== Old World sparrows ==
Order: Passeriformes Family: Passeridae

Old World sparrows are small passerine birds, typically small, plump, brown or grey with short tails and short powerful beaks. They are seed-eaters, but also consume small insects.

- House sparrow, Passer domesticus (A)
- Eurasian tree sparrow, Passer montanus

== See also ==
- List of birds
- Lists of birds by region
