= Micronesian broadbill =

Micronesian broadbill may refer to:

- Guam flycatcher, an extinct species of bird formerly endemic to Guam
- Oceanic flycatcher, a species of bird found on the Caroline Islands
- Palau flycatcher, a species of bird endemic to Palau
