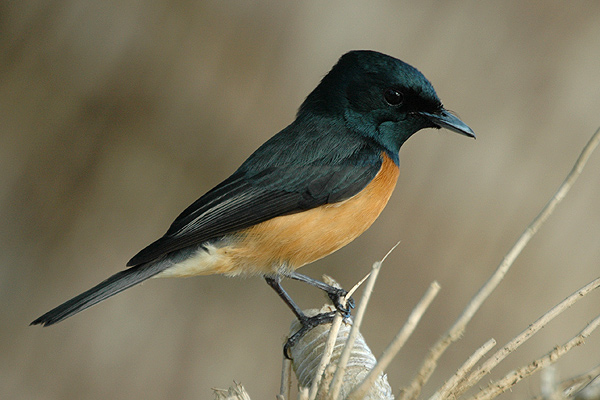
- male

Conservation status
- Least Concern (IUCN 3.1)

Scientific classification
- Kingdom: Animalia
- Phylum: Chordata
- Class: Aves
- Order: Passeriformes
- Family: Monarchidae
- Genus: Myiagra
- Species: M. vanikorensis

Binomial name
- Myiagra vanikorensis (Quoy & Gaimard, 1832)

Subspecies
- See text

Synonyms
- Platyrhynchos vanikorensis

= Vanikoro flycatcher =

Species of bird

The Vanikoro flycatcher (Myiagra vanikorensis) is a species of monarch flycatcher in the family Monarchidae. It has a slightly disjunct distribution, occurring on Vanikoro island (in the southern Solomon archipelago) and in Fiji.

== Taxonomy and systematics ==
The Vanikoro flycatcher was described by the French zoologists Jean Quoy and Joseph Gaimard in 1832 from a specimen collected on the island of Vanikoro in the Solomon Islands. They coined the binomial name, Platyrhynshos vanikorensis. (Note: Although the ornithological part of the Voyage de la corvette l'Astrolabe has 1830 on the title page it was not published until 1832.) It is closely related to the insular Melanesian flycatcher, Samoan flycatcher, Makira flycatcher and Solomon flycatcher, as well as the Australian leaden flycatcher. The Vanikoro flycatcher was originally described in the genus Platyrhynchos. This species should not be confused with the similarly named Vanikoro monarch which also uses Vanikoro flycatcher as an alternate name. Alternate names for the Vanikoro flycatcher include the red-bellied flycatcher, Vanikoro broadbill, Vanikoro myiagra and Vanikoro myiagra flycatcher.

=== Subspecies ===
Five subspecies are recognized:

- M. v. vanikorensis - (Quoy & Gaimard, 1830): Found on Vanikoro (eastern Solomon Islands)
- M. v. rufiventris - Elliot, DG, 1859: Originally described as a separate species. Found on northern, central and southern Fiji
- M. v. kandavensis - Mayr, 1933: Found on Beqa, Vatulele and Kadavu Island (south-western Fiji)
- M. v. dorsalis - Mayr, 1933: Found on northern Lau Islands and the Moala Islands (eastern Fiji)
- M. v. townsendi - Wetmore, 1919: Originally described as a separate species. Found on southern Lau Islands (south-eastern Fiji)

== Description ==
The Vanikoro flycatcher is a small passerine, 13 cm long and weighing around 13 g. It has a large, slightly hooked black bill and black legs. The plumage varies between the sexes; the male has dark blue-black plumage over the head and throat, back, tail and wings, and a washed out red belly with a white rump. The pattern for the female is similar, but paler overall (orange instead of red, slate grey instead of dark blue) and with the orange of the belly also coming up the throat as far as the bill. There is some variation based on subspecies; the female of the race dorsalis of the northern Lau Group has a white throat, whereas the male of kandavensis has much richer orange underparts. The juvenile birds resemble females but also have white scalloping on the wings.

== Distribution and habitat ==
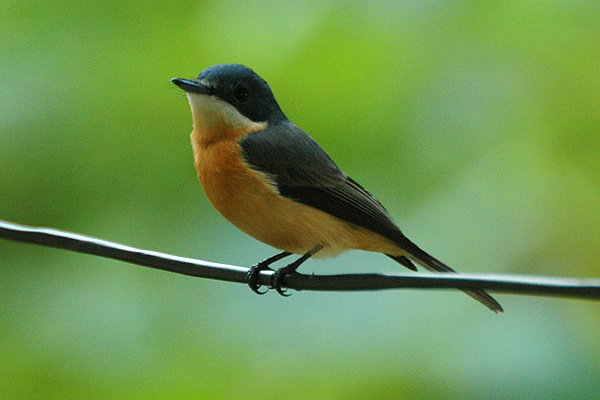
Female Vanikoro flycatcher, photographed near Suva, Fiji

The Vanikoro flycatcher is capable of living in a wide variety of habitats. It naturally occurs in forest and forest edge habitats from sea level up to 1100 m, but has also adapted to living in disturbed human altered habitats, including gardens and cultivated areas, so long as a few trees survive. The species is insectivorous, taking a variety of insects by sallying from perches and snatching them in the air or from the undersides of leaves. In addition to insects Vanikoro flycatchers will also eat lizards and small fruits. Individuals, pairs or even small groups forage in the canopy in undisturbed forest but will use other areas in disturbed areas; they will forage around buildings are highly inquisitive.

== Behaviour and ecology ==
In Fiji the Vanikoro flycatcher breeds from September to February. The nest is a small cup of plant fibres, grass stems and roots, decorated on the outside with lichen and leaves and lined with animal hair. The nest is placed high in a tree on a horizontal branch. nest construction is undertaken by both sexes, as in incubation and chick rearing. The clutch of pinkish-white freckled eggs usually numbers 1–2. Predators, like the Fiji goshawk and the local race of the peregrine falcon, are aggressively mobbed.

== Status ==
The Vanikoro flycatcher is not considered threatened by the IUCN, and is listed as least Concern. It remains common across most of Fiji, and is tolerant of human changes to the environment.
