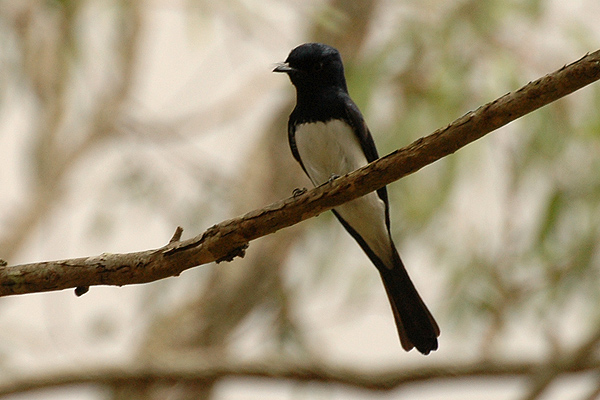

Conservation status
- Least Concern (IUCN 3.1)

Scientific classification
- Kingdom: Animalia
- Phylum: Chordata
- Class: Aves
- Order: Passeriformes
- Family: Monarchidae
- Genus: Myiagra
- Species: M. cyanoleuca

Binomial name
- Myiagra cyanoleuca (Vieillot, 1818)

Synonyms
- Platyrhynchos cyanoleucus

= Satin flycatcher =

Species of bird

The satin flycatcher (Myiagra cyanoleuca) is a species of bird in the family Monarchidae. Males stand out with their blue-black feathers contrasting their white bellies, and the females with their bright orange throats. It breeds mostly in south-eastern Tasmania and Australia. It is declining throughout the eastern seaboard due to predation from the introduced Red Fox and habitat loss. It is a vagrant to New Zealand.

== Taxonomy and systematics ==
The satin flycatcher was originally described in the genus Platyrhynchos. Alternate names include satin Myiagra and satin Myiagra-flycatcher. The name Myiagra is derived from the Ancient Greek 'muia', meaning 'fly' (insect), and 'agreo', meaning 'seize' (thus, 'flycatcher'). Cyanoleuca is derived from 'cyanos' (blue) and 'leucos' (white).

The satin flycatcher is a member of the Monarchidae family, or the Monarchs, which contains around 100 small, passerine, insectivorous birds. The family stretches across much of the planet, with species living in Africa, Asia and the pacific amongst other areas.

The genus Myiagra is distinct from other members of the Monarchidae family by their obvious sexual dimorphism, egg patterns, and unpatterned crests. Most have black bills, orange mouths, and the males have glossy, shiny feathers. The Myiagra genus are mainly distributed in the Australasia region, existing almost exclusively in Australia, New Zealand, and other pacific islands.

The satin flycatcher is distinct from other flycatchers by the male's deep blue and white plumage, and the shiny 'satin' appearance of it. Other similar flycatchers include the Broad-billed flycatcher (Myiagra ruficollis) and the Leaden flycatcher (Myiagra rubecula). The broad-billed flycatcher is similar in appearance to the female Myiagra cyanoleuca and has less distinct sexual dimorphism, while the Leaden flycatcher appears even more similar, having the same colourations of Myiagra cyanoleuca's male to female dimorphisms. The distributions of these species sets them apart; the Satin flycatcher is far more common in the south-east, whereas the other two flycatchers are distributed across Queensland and the Northern Territory.

== Description ==
The satin flycatcher is a small bird, around 17 cm tall, and weighing around 17g. They have a small, sharp, pointed beak used for catching small invertebrates (insects). The species has sexually dimorphic characteristics; the male birds are a glossy black-blue colour, with a white belly and small crest upon their head, while the females are a dusty brown-grey colour with a bright orange chest and throat, and a white belly. They stand upright, and their tail feathers spread out to form a 'fan' shape.

== Distribution ==
The satin flycatcher is most common in south-eastern Australia, where it likes to breed in the warmer months, but will live year-round on the east-coast of Australia in New South Wales, Queensland, and even Papua New Guinea. They also stretch along the southern coast of Australia into South Australia. They are vagrant to New Zealand.

== Breeding ==
The satin flycatcher migrates to south-east Australia in November and remain there until early January to breed. They mate and remain in pairs over the breeding season, working together to raise their chicks. The Satin flycatcher prefers to lay their eggs in various Eucalyptus species in high branches (5-25m high), and often nest in similar areas to previous years. They lay two to three greenish blue with brown spotted eggs in a neat nest made of bark, spider's web and moss.
