= Micronesian Myiagra =

Micronesian Myiagra may refer to:

- Guam flycatcher, an extinct species of bird formerly endemic to Guam
- Oceanic flycatcher, a species of bird found on the Caroline Islands
