= M. rubecula =

M. rubecula may refer to:

- Motacilla rubecula, a small insectivorous passerine bird species
- Myiagra rubecula, a passerine bird species

== See also ==
- Rubecula
