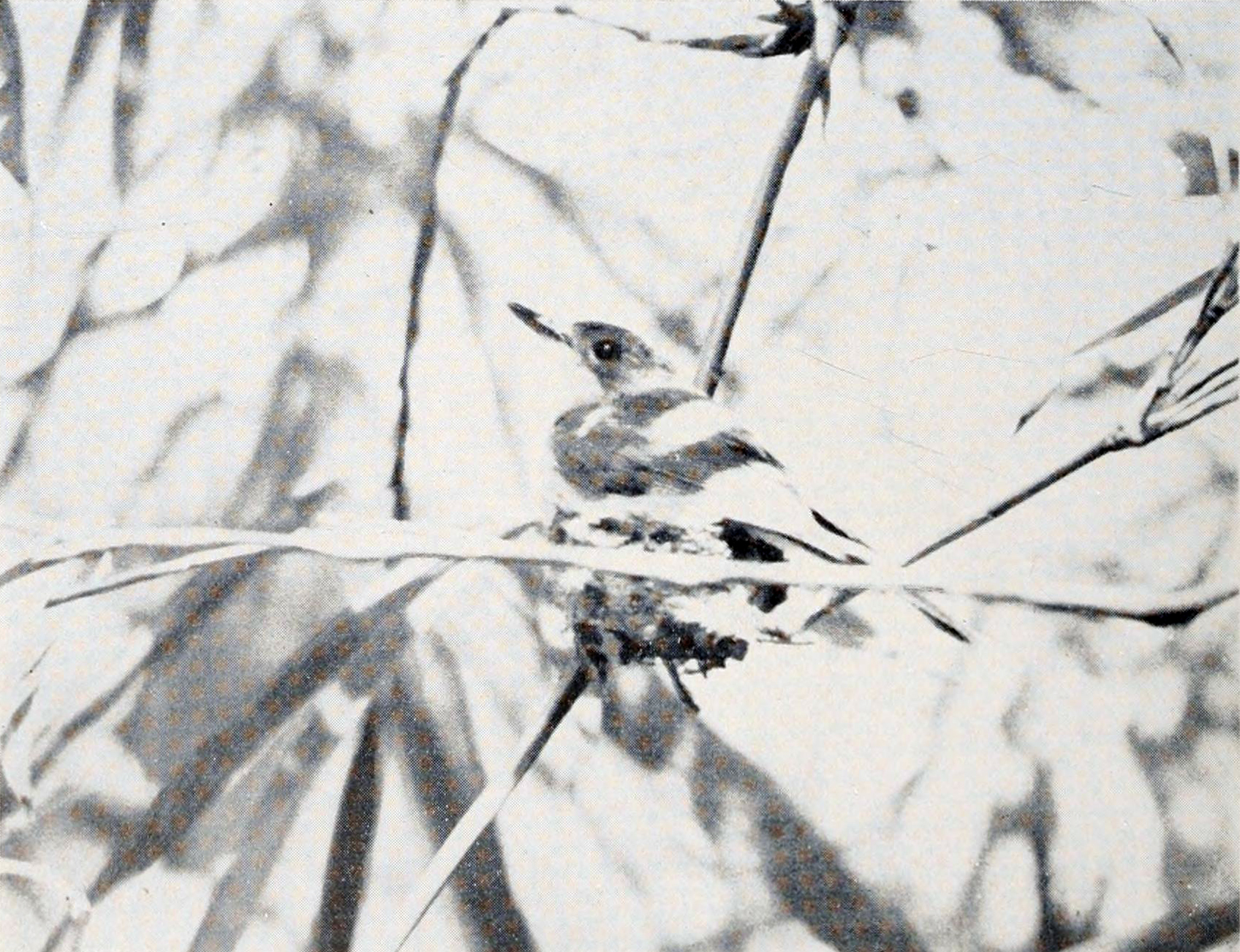
- Specimen in Mount Santa Rosa

Conservation status
- Extinct (1983) (IUCN 3.1)

Scientific classification
- Kingdom: Animalia
- Phylum: Chordata
- Class: Aves
- Order: Passeriformes
- Family: Monarchidae
- Genus: Myiagra
- Species: †M. freycineti

Binomial name
- †Myiagra freycineti Oustalet, 1881

Synonyms
- Myiagra freycinetti; Myiagra oceanica freycineti

= Guam flycatcher =

Guam flycatcher/ Guam broadbill

Species of extinct bird

The Guam flycatcher (Myiagra freycineti), or Guam broadbill, is an extinct species of bird in the family Monarchidae formerly endemic to Guam.

== Taxonomy and systematics ==
Some authorities consider the Guam flycatcher to have been a subspecies of the Oceanic flycatcher. It has also been considered conspecific with the Pohnpei flycatcher and Palau flycatcher. It was locally known as the chuguangguang. Alternate names for the Guam flycatcher include Guam Myiagra, Guam Myiagra flycatcher, Marianne Islands flycatcher, Micronesian broadbill, and Micronesian Myiagra.

== Description ==
The Guam flycatcher was a small bird measuring 5 inches (13 cm) long with different coloration for the males and females. Males were glossy blue-black above while females were brownish-gray. Both had white below and buff coloration on the breast. It had a wide bill with long "whiskers" which helped it locate its food.

== Status ==
Turnaround video of specimen RMNH 110.008 at Naturalis Biodiversity Center

The bird was secretive and occurred mainly in limestone and ravine forests. Although common on Guam as recently as the early 1970s, the flycatcher's population went into a rapid decline due to predation by the brown tree snake, Boiga irregularis, which was accidentally introduced to the island in the 1940s. The last sighting of the flycatcher occurred in the Santa Rosa area in 1983.

Given the small size of the island, the complete absence of recent sightings, and the universal presence of the brown tree snake in the bird's former habitat, the Guam flycatcher is considered extinct.

== See also ==
- List of birds of Guam
