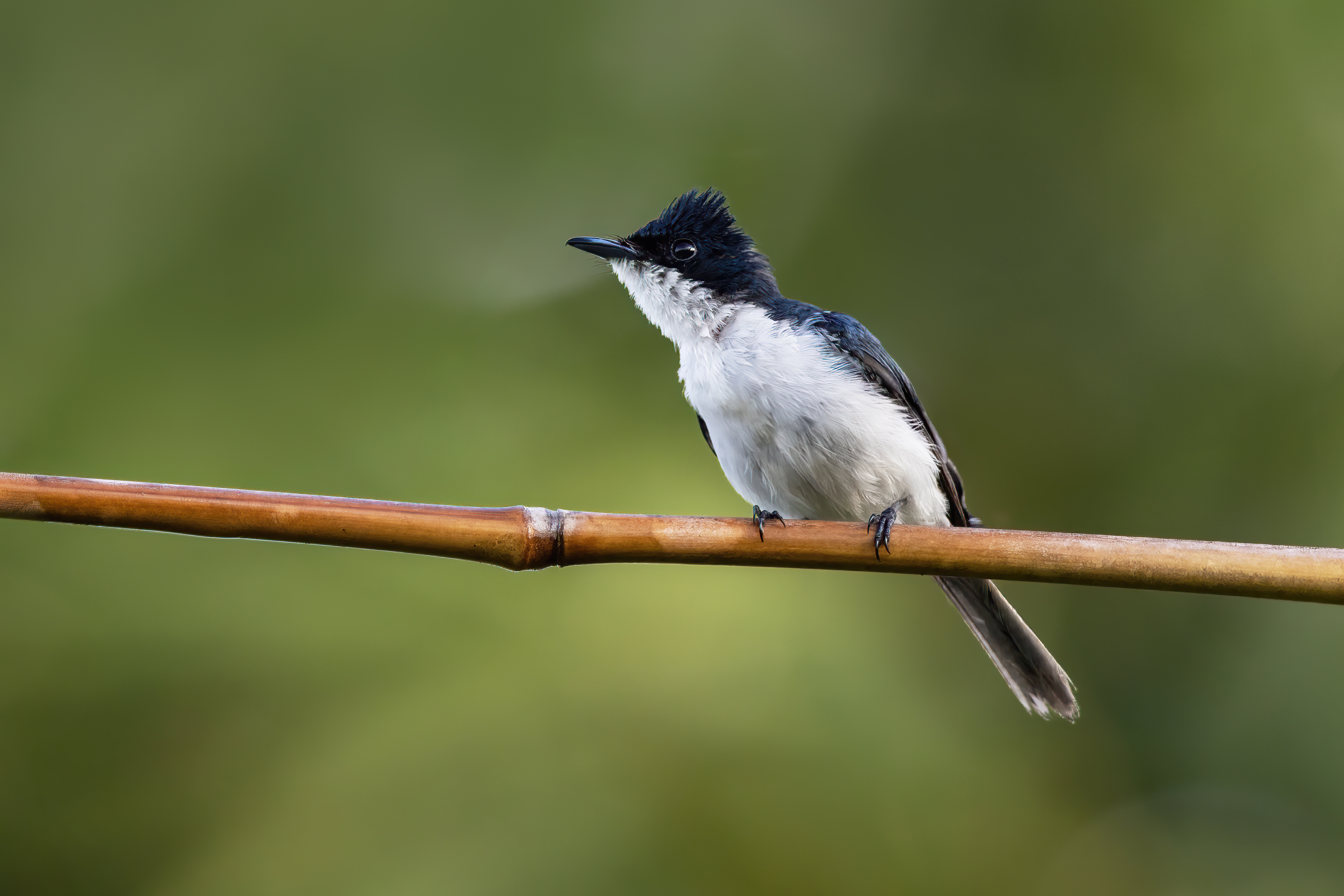
- male
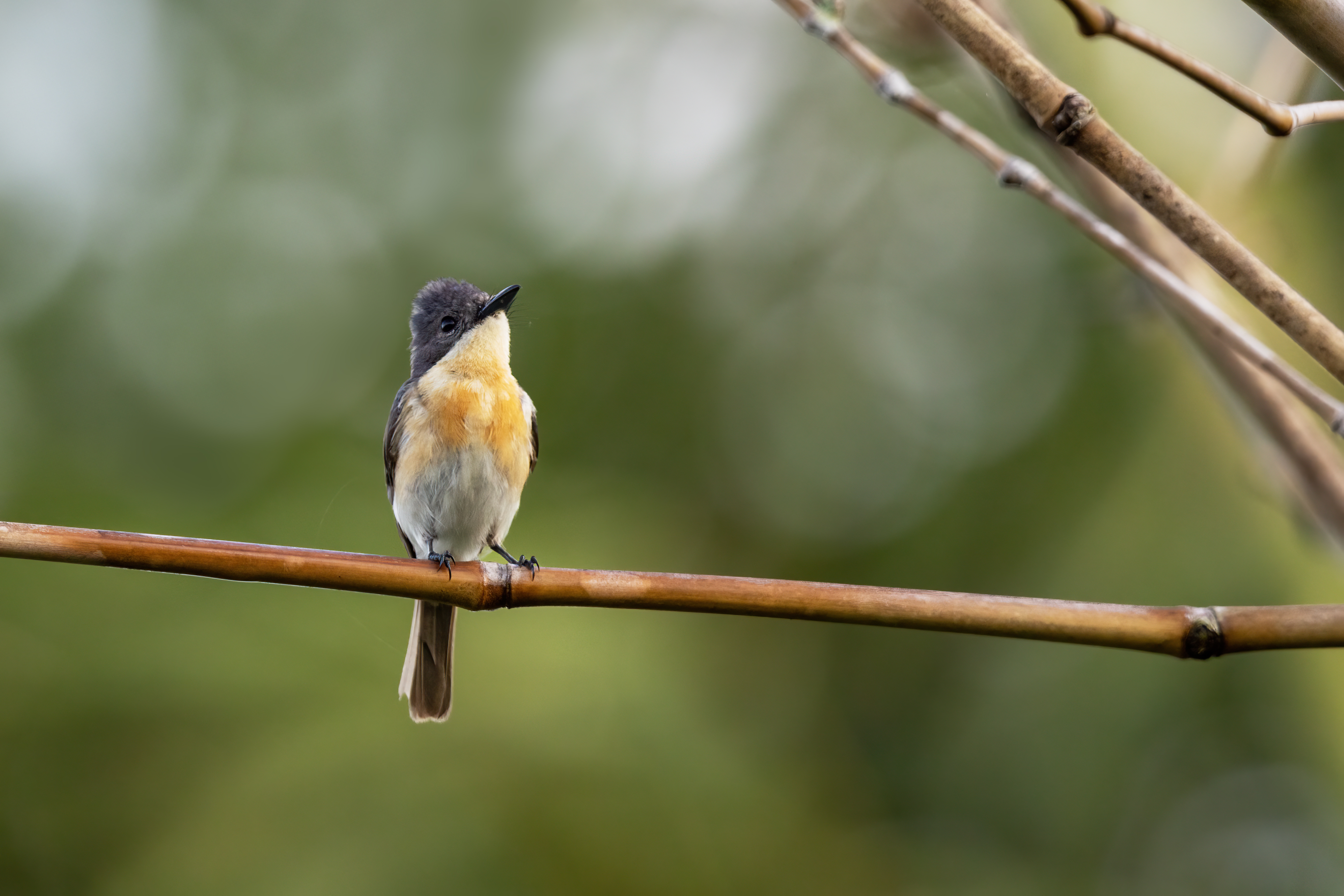
- female

Conservation status
- Least Concern (IUCN 3.1)

Scientific classification
- Kingdom: Animalia
- Phylum: Chordata
- Class: Aves
- Order: Passeriformes
- Family: Monarchidae
- Genus: Myiagra
- Species: M. galeata

Binomial name
- Myiagra galeata G.R. Gray, 1861

Subspecies
- See text

= Moluccan flycatcher =

Species of bird

The Moluccan flycatcher or dark-grey flycatcher (Myiagra galeata) is a species of bird in the family Monarchidae. It is endemic to Indonesia.

Its natural habitat is subtropical or tropical moist lowland forests.

== Taxonomy and systematics ==
Alternate names for the Moluccan flycatcher include helmet flycatcher, helmeted broadbill, helmeted flycatcher, Moluccan Myiagra, Moluccan Myiagra flycatcher and slaty monarch. The latter name should not be confused with the species of the same name, Mayrornis lessoni.

=== Subspecies ===
There are three subspecies recognized:

- M. g. galeata - G.R. Gray, 1861: Found in the northern Moluccas
- M. g. goramensis - Sharpe, 1879: Originally described as a separate species. Found in the southern and south-eastern Moluccas
- M. g. buruensis - Hartert, 1903: Found on Buru (south-western Moluccas)
