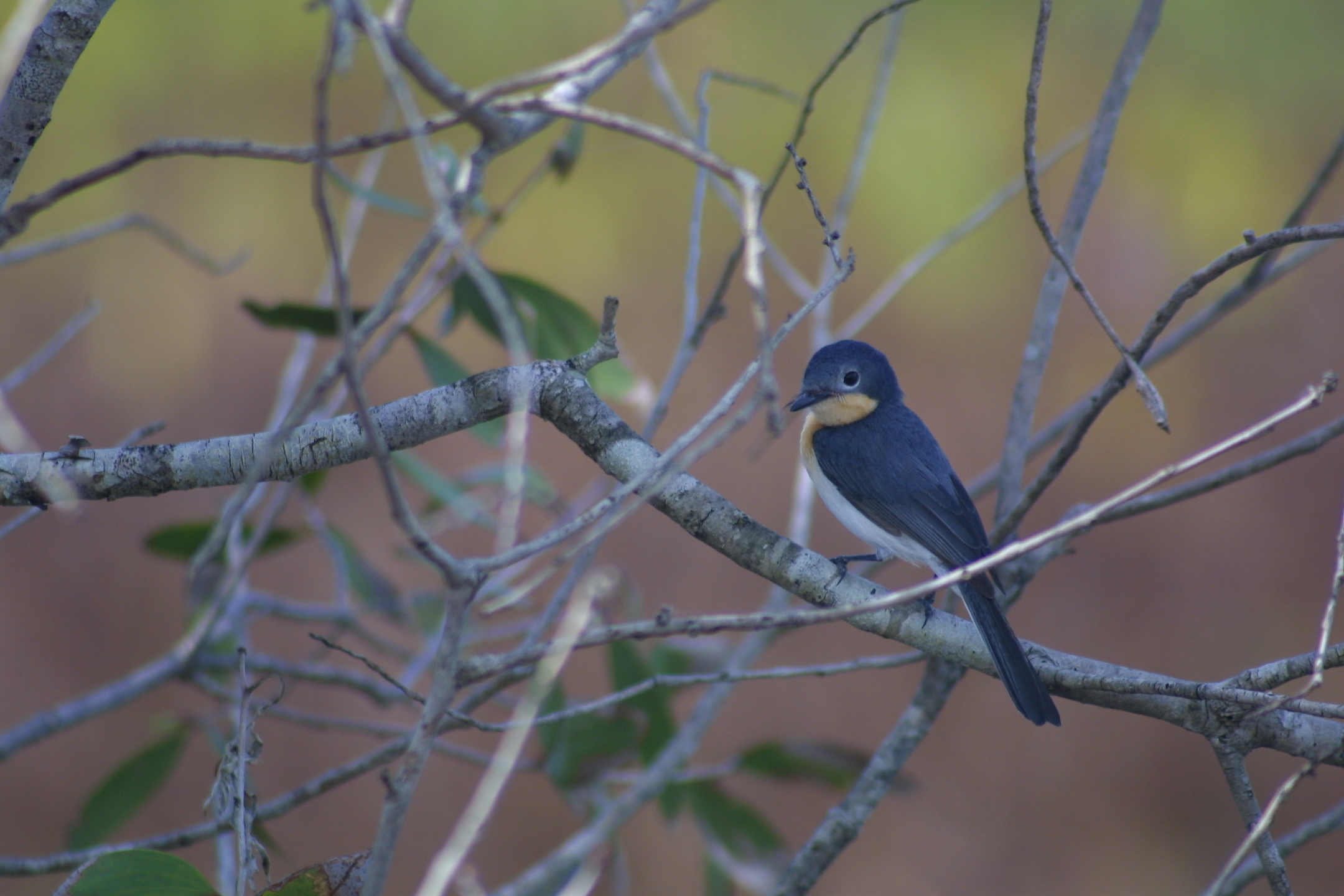
- Broad-billed flycatcher Myiagra ruficollis

Scientific classification
- Kingdom: Animalia
- Phylum: Chordata
- Class: Aves
- Order: Passeriformes
- Family: Monarchidae
- Genus: Myiagra; Vigors & Horsfield, 1827

Type species
- Myiagra rubeculoides = Todus rubecula Vigors & Horsfield, 1827

Species
- see text

Synonyms
- Piezorhynchus; Seisura

= Myiagra =

Genus of birds, mostly flycatchers

Myiagra is a genus of passerine birds in the family Monarchidae, the monarch flycatchers, native to Australasia, sometimes referred to as the broad-billed flycatchers or simply broadbills.

== Taxonomy ==
The genus Myiagra was introduced in 1827 by the naturalists Nicholas Vigors and Thomas Horsfield. The name combines the Ancient Greek muia meaning "a fly" and agreō meaning "to seize". Myiagros was also the name of a Greek god. The type species was designated by George Robert Gray in 1840 as the leaden flycatcher.

=== Species ===
The genus contains 21 species, including one that is now extinct:

| Image | Common name | Scientific name |
|---|---|---|
| | Chuuk flycatcher | Myiagra oceanica |
| | Palau flycatcher | Myiagra erythrops |
| | Pohnpei flycatcher | Myiagra pluto |
| | Moluccan flycatcher | Myiagra galeata |
| | Biak black flycatcher | Myiagra atra |
| | Leaden flycatcher | Myiagra rubecula |
| | Steel-blue flycatcher | Myiagra ferrocyanea |
| | Makira flycatcher | Myiagra cervinicauda |
| | Melanesian flycatcher | Myiagra caledonica |
| | Vanikoro flycatcher | Myiagra vanikorensis |
| | Samoan flycatcher | Myiagra albiventris |
| | Azure-crested flycatcher | Myiagra azureocapilla |
| | Chestnut-throated flycatcher | Myiagra castaneigularis |
| | Broad-billed flycatcher | Myiagra ruficollis |
| | Satin flycatcher | Myiagra cyanoleuca |
| | Shining flycatcher | Myiagra alecto |
| | Mussau flycatcher | Myiagra hebetior |
| | Velvet flycatcher | Myiagra eichhorni – includes Dyaul flycatcher |
| | Paperbark flycatcher | Myiagra nana |
| | Restless flycatcher | Myiagra inquieta |
| | † Guam flycatcher | Myiagra freycineti (extinct) |

=== Former species ===
Formerly, some authorities also considered the following species (or subspecies) as species within the genus Myiagra:

- Andamanen black-naped blue monarch (as Myiagra tytleri)
- Pale-blue monarch (as Myiagra puella)
- White-collared monarch (as Piezorhynchus vidua)
- White-collared monarch (squamulatus) (as Piezorhynchus squamulatus)
- White-capped monarch (as Piezorhynchus Richardsii)

== Description ==
Members of this genus are separated from other members of the family, particularly the Monarcha monarchs they resemble, by their consistent sexual dimorphism, egg patterning, and the crested heads that often lack facial patterns (a few Monarcha monarchs also lack facial patterns). Flycatchers in the genus Myiagra are small birds ranging in length from 13–20 cm in length. They have broad flattened bills adapted to catching insects. The bill is usually black, the exception being the blue-crested flycatcher of Fiji, whose bill is bright orange. The insides of their mouths are bright orange, noticeable when singing. When perched they have an upright stance. The satiny plumage of all species is sexually dichromatic, to a greater or lesser degree. Overall males tend to have dark blue or black heads, backs, wings and tails and pale bellies and rumps. Some males have red underparts, others have the dark upper plumage all over, and the slightly aberrant shining flycatchers have chestnut wings, backs and tails. The females follow a similar pattern to males but have lighter, more washed out colours. When perched the species in this genus constantly moves their closed tail, in the restless flycatcher the tail is shacked from side to side. The orange lining to their mouths is visible when they sing.

Members of this genus differ from the closely related genus Monarcha in having their crested heads often unpatterned, and the sexes being different in appearance. They have satiny plumage and perch upright, their long tails tending to move frequently. Males typically have dark blue heads and upper parts and paler underparts, and females are mostly similar in appearance to the males but their colour is more washed out and less intense. Their broad beaks are adapted to feed on insects, which they mostly catch on the wing.

=== Vocalizations ===
The calls are generally unmusical and are described as guttural, harsh and rasping.

== Behaviour and ecology ==
The genus is adapted to feeding on insects in a manner similar to the Old World flycatchers in the family Muscicapidae. Prey is obtained by sallying from a perch to obtain flying insects or by hover-gleaning, snatching insects from the undersides of leaves while in flight.

== Distribution and habitat ==
The genus is spread across Australasia, with some representatives in Wallacea, New Guinea, Australia, the Solomon Islands, New Caledonia, Vanuatu, Fiji, Samoa and Micronesia. Members of this genus occur as occasional vagrants in New Zealand and formerly occurred in Tonga and Guam.
