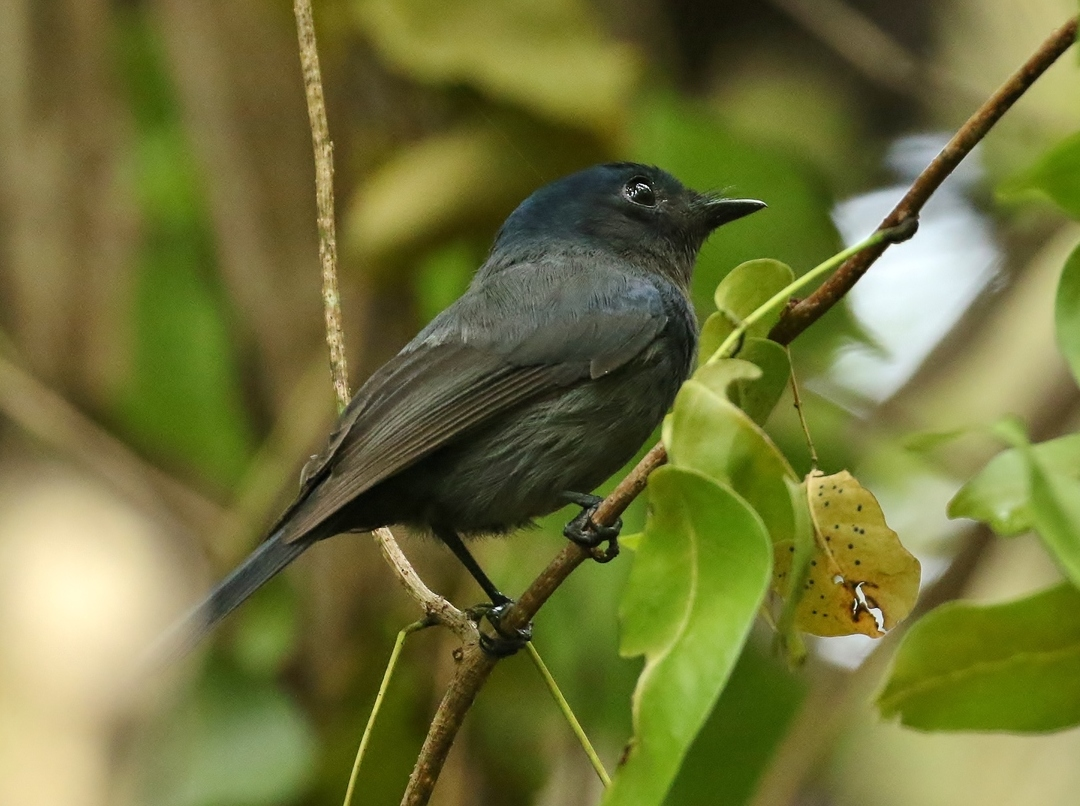

Conservation status
- Least Concern (IUCN 3.1)

Scientific classification
- Kingdom: Animalia
- Phylum: Chordata
- Class: Aves
- Order: Passeriformes
- Family: Monarchidae
- Genus: Myiagra
- Species: M. pluto

Binomial name
- Myiagra pluto Finsch, 1876

Synonyms
- Myiagra oceanica pluto

= Pohnpei flycatcher =

Species of bird

The Pohnpei flycatcher (Myiagra pluto), known as Koikoi in Pohnpeian, is a species of bird in the family Monarchidae. It is endemic to Micronesia and can be found on the Caroline Islands.

== Taxonomy and systematics ==
Some authorities consider the Pohnpei flycatcher to be a subspecies of the oceanic flycatcher. Alternate names include the Pohnpei broadbill, Ponape broadbill, Ponape flycatcher and Ponape Myiagra flycatcher.
