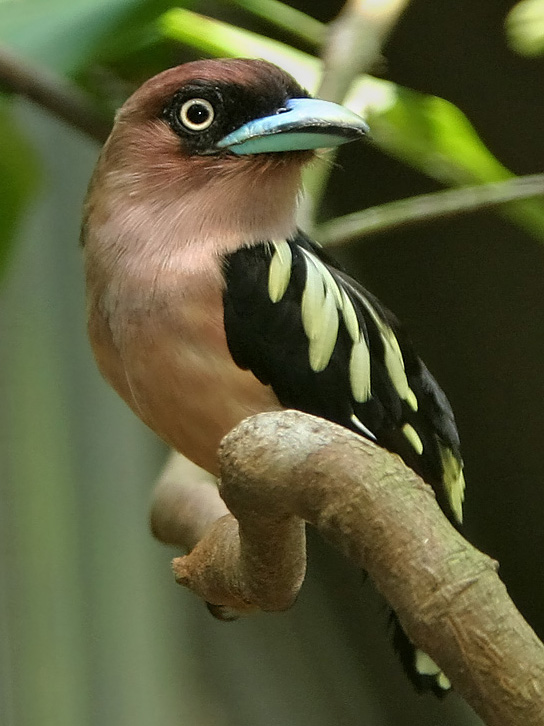
- Banded broadbill (Eurylaimus javanicus)

Scientific classification
- Kingdom: Animalia
- Phylum: Chordata
- Class: Aves
- Order: Passeriformes
- Family: Eurylaimidae
- Genus: Eurylaimus; Horsfield, 1821

Type species
- Eurylaimus javanicus (banded broadbill) Horsfield 1821

Synonyms
- Platyrhynchos

= Eurylaimus =

Genus of birds

Eurylaimus is a genus of broadbills (family Eurylaimidae) found in Southeast Asia.

== Taxonomy ==
The genus Eurylaimus was introduced in 1821 by the American naturalist Thomas Horsfield to accommodate the banded broadbill (Eurylaimus javanicus). The name means 'broad throat', from the Greek eurus (εὐρύς, 'broad, wide') and laimos (λαιμός, 'throat').

=== Extant species ===
Two extant species are recognized:

Image	Scientific name	Common name	Distribution
	Eurylaimus javanicus	Banded broadbill	Brunei, Cambodia, Indonesia, Laos, Malaysia, Myanmar, Singapore, Thailand, and Vietnam.
	Eurylaimus ochromalus	Black-and-yellow broadbill	Brunei, Indonesia, Malaysia, Myanmar, Singapore, and Thailand

=== Former species ===
Formerly, some authorities also considered the following species (or subspecies) as species within the genus Eurylaimus:

- Wattled broadbill (as Eurylaimus steerii)
- Visayan broadbill ( as Eurylaimus samarensis)
- Vanikoro flycatcher (as Platyrhynchos vanikorensis)
- Broad-billed flycatcher (as Platyrhynchos ruficollis)
- Satin flycatcher (as Platyrhynchos cyanoleucus)
