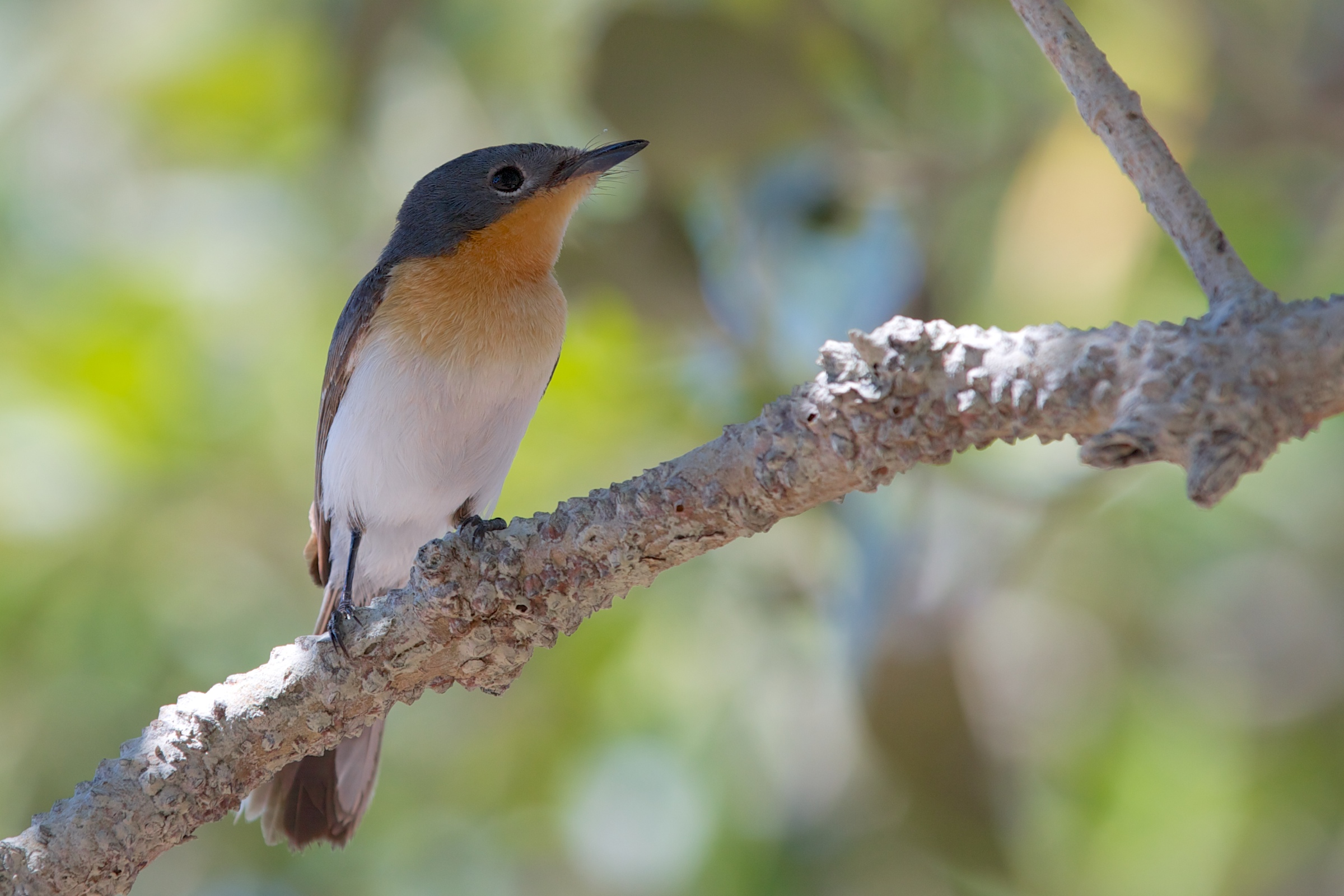

Conservation status
- Least Concern (IUCN 3.1)

Scientific classification
- Kingdom: Animalia
- Phylum: Chordata
- Class: Aves
- Order: Passeriformes
- Family: Monarchidae
- Genus: Myiagra
- Species: M. ruficollis

Binomial name
- Myiagra ruficollis (Vieillot, 1818)

Subspecies
- See text

Synonyms
- Platyrhynchos ruficollis

= Broad-billed flycatcher =

Species of bird

The broad-billed flycatcher (Myiagra ruficollis) is a species of bird in the family Monarchidae. It is found in northern Australia, the Lesser Sunda Islands and southern New Guinea. Its natural habitats are subtropical or tropical moist lowland forest, subtropical or tropical mangrove forest, and subtropical or tropical moist montane forest.

== Taxonomy and systematics ==
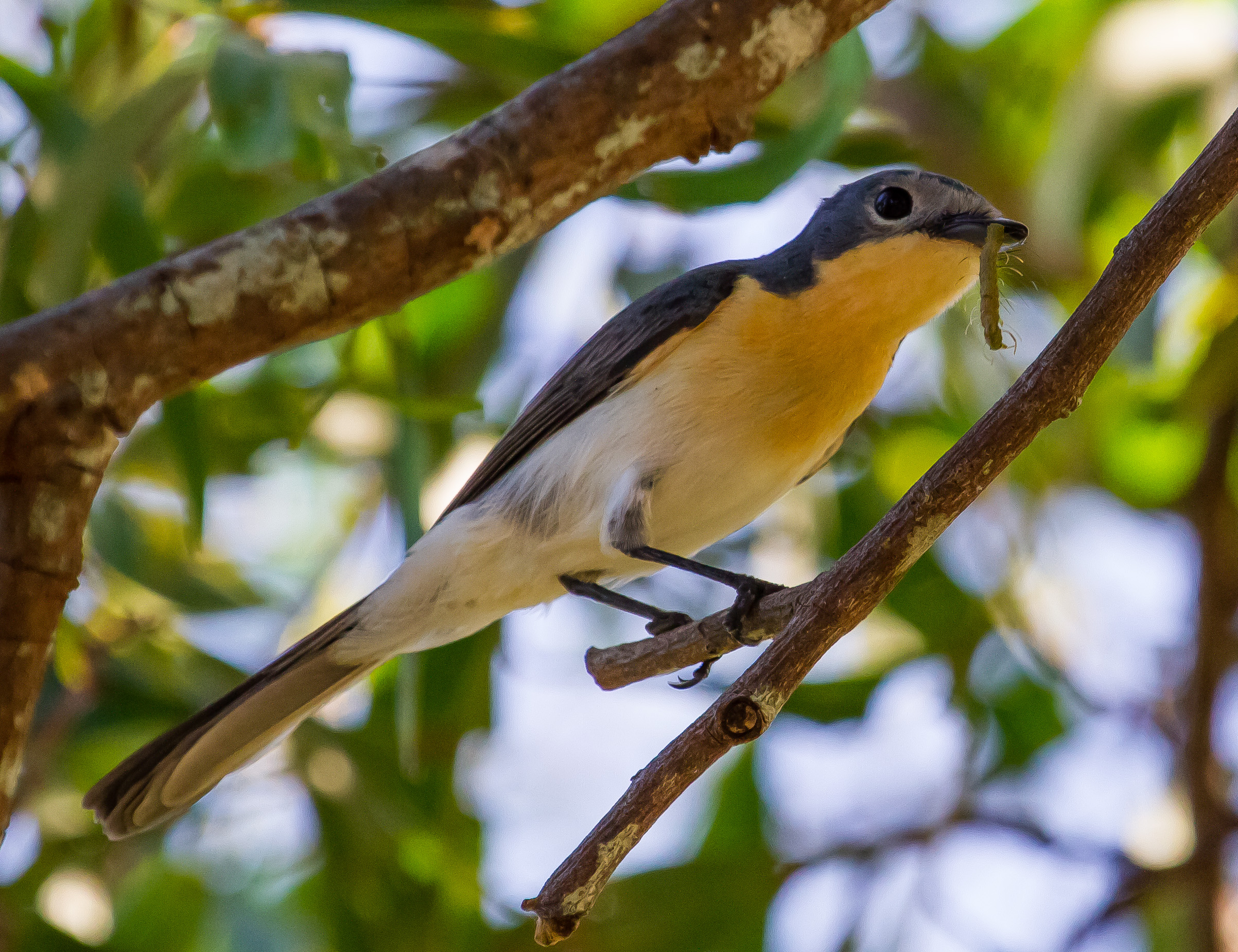
Broad-billed flycatcher with caterpillar - Fogg Dam, Middle Point, Northern Territory, Australia

The broad-billed flycatcher was originally described in the genus Platyrhynchos. The name "broad-billed flycatcher" is also used as an alternate name for the Melanesian flycatcher.

=== Subspecies ===
Three subspecies are recognized:

- M. r. ruficollis - (Vieillot, 1818): Found on southern and eastern Lesser Sunda Islands and islands in the Flores Sea
- Buff-bellied flycatcher (M. r. fulviventris) - Sclater, PL, 1883: Originally described as a separate species until 2008. Also known as Tanimbar flycatcher but is not to be confused with the species of the same name, Ficedula riedeli. Found on the Tanimbar Islands
- M. r. mimikae - Ogilvie-Grant, 1911: Originally described as a separate species. Found in southern New Guinea, Aru Islands (off south-western New Guinea), islands of the Torres Strait and northern and north-eastern Australia

== Description ==
In northern Australia, the broad-billed flycatcher is commonly found in moist forests and scrub surrounding permanent and seasonal fresh water areas such as billabongs and wet season marshes. Its size ranges from 14 to 17 cm. The bird feeds in the forest canopy on insects and small invertebrates. Unlike co-resident related species such as the paperbark flycatcher (M. nana) the broad-billed flycatcher is rarely seen hawking for insects in open areas outside the canopy.

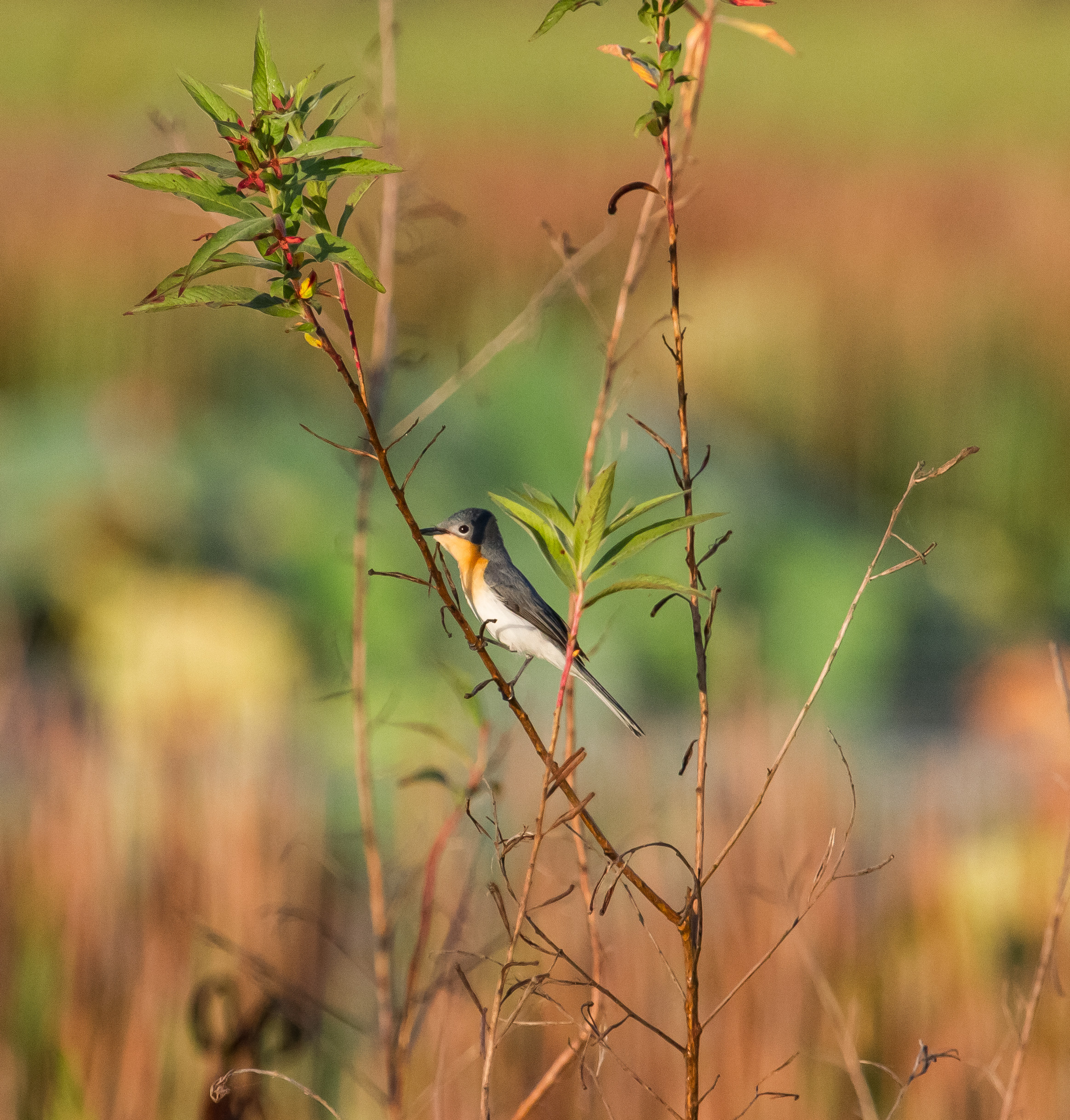
Fogg Dam, Middle Point, Northern Territory, Australia, March 2014
