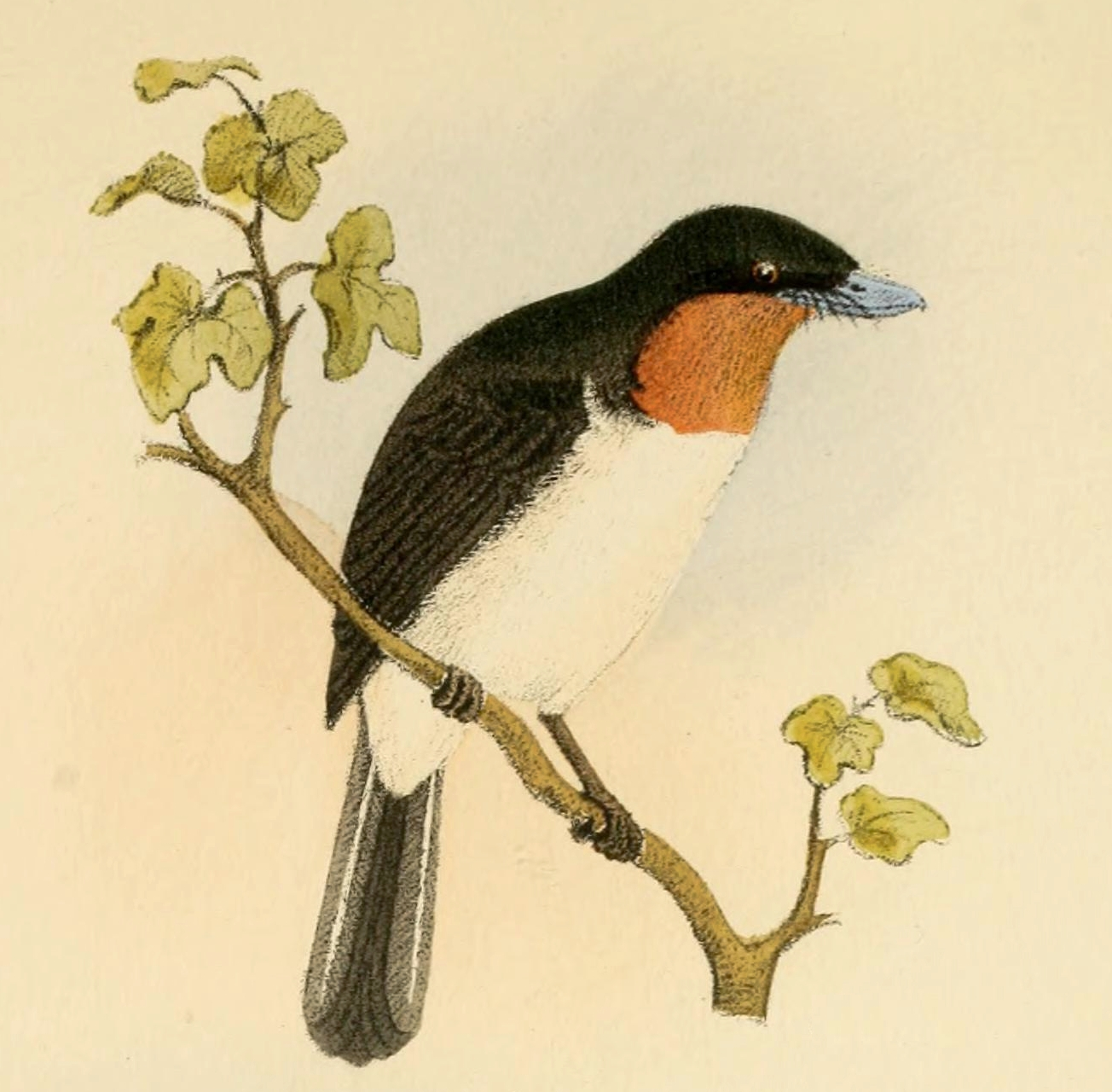
- in a Plate from Hartlaub and Finsch Beitrag zur fauna Centralpolynesiens. Ornithologie der Viti, Samoa und Tonga
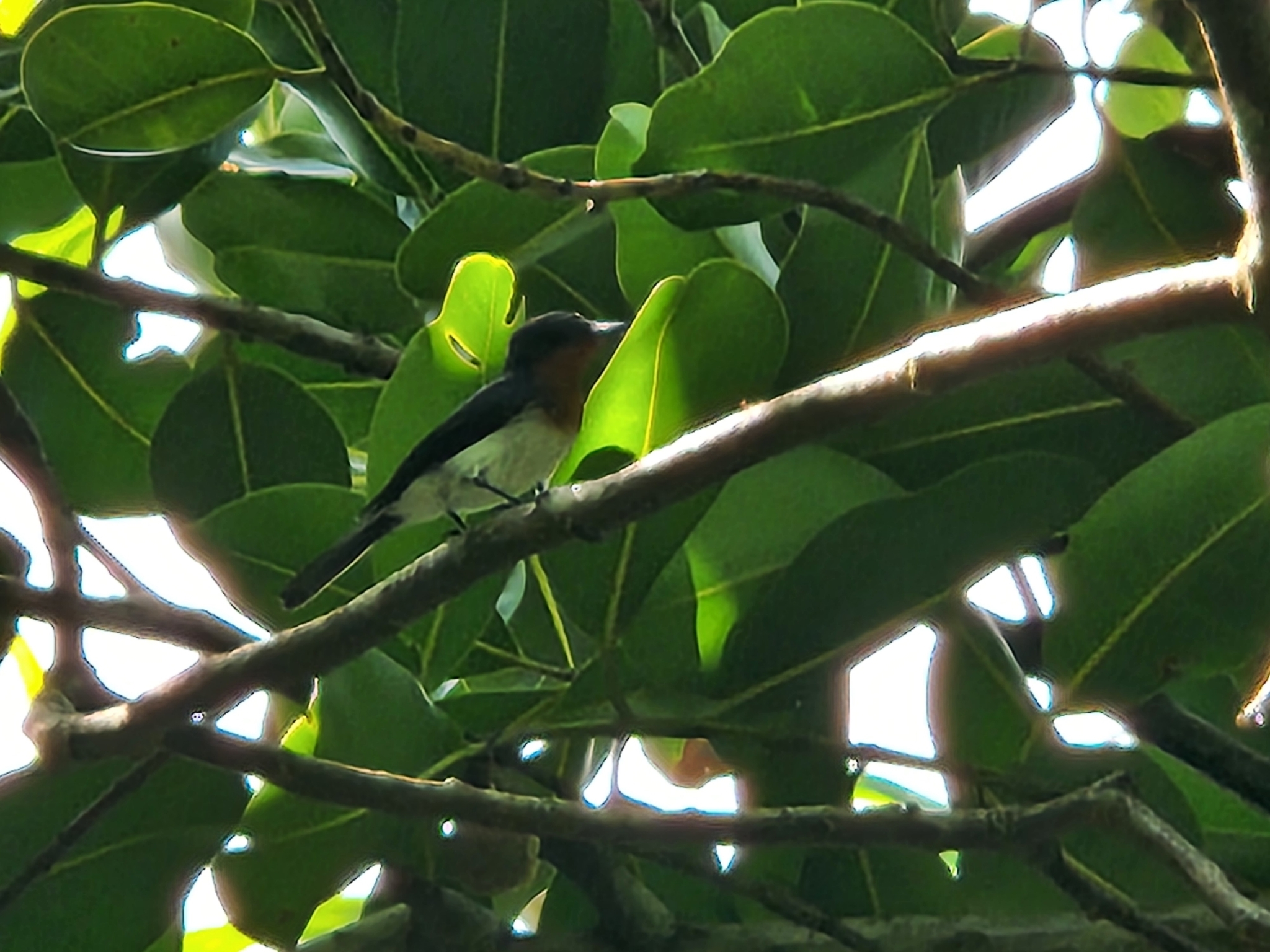

Conservation status
- Least Concern (IUCN 3.1)

Scientific classification
- Kingdom: Animalia
- Phylum: Chordata
- Class: Aves
- Order: Passeriformes
- Family: Monarchidae
- Genus: Myiagra
- Species: M. albiventris

Binomial name
- Myiagra albiventris (Peale, 1849)

Synonyms
- Platyrhynchus albiventris

= Samoan flycatcher =

Species of bird

The Samoan flycatcher (Myiagra albiventris) (Tolaifatu) is a species of bird in the family Monarchidae. It is endemic to Samoa. Its natural habitats are subtropical or tropical moist lowland forests, subtropical or tropical moist montane forests, and rural gardens. The bird is insectiverous, and snatches its prey in mid-flight.

It is sometimes known as the Samoan broadbill.

== Taxonomy ==
The Samoan starling was formally described in 1848 or 1849 by American naturalist Titian Peale in volume VIII of the report of the United States Exploring Expedition. He placed it with the new world flycatchers in the genus Platyrhynchus and coined the binomial name Platyrhynchus albiventris. He based his description on samples and observations taken during the expedition. The Samoan flycatcher is now placed in the genus Myiagra which was introduced in 1827 by the naturalists Nicholas Vigors and Thomas Horsfield.

== Description ==
The Samoan flycatcher is a small passerine, 17 - 19 cm long with a wing-span of 26-30cm. It has a blue-black head, tail, and neck, a rusty-brown breast, and a white belly. Females are slightly lighter in colour than males, with less rusty colouring on the throat.

== Conservation status ==
The Samoan flycatcher was previously classified as vulnerable on the basis of a rapid population decline in the 1990's caused by two cyclones which devastated its forest habitats. In 2011 it was upgraded to near-threatened following evidence it had recovered somewhat, but that it was still under threat from habitat loss. In 2024 it was upgraded again to least concern as its population and range appeared stable.
