= Ranongga white-eye =

Conservation status
- Least Concern (IUCN 3.1)

Scientific classification
- Kingdom: Animalia
- Phylum: Chordata
- Class: Aves
- Order: Passeriformes
- Family: Zosteropidae
- Genus: Zosterops
- Species: Z. splendidus

Binomial name
- Zosterops splendidus Hartert, 1929

Species of bird

The Ranongga white-eye or splendid white-eye (Zosterops splendidus) is a species of bird in the family Zosteropidae. It is endemic to the Solomon Islands.

Its natural habitat is subtropical or tropical moist lowland forests. It is threatened by habitat loss.
