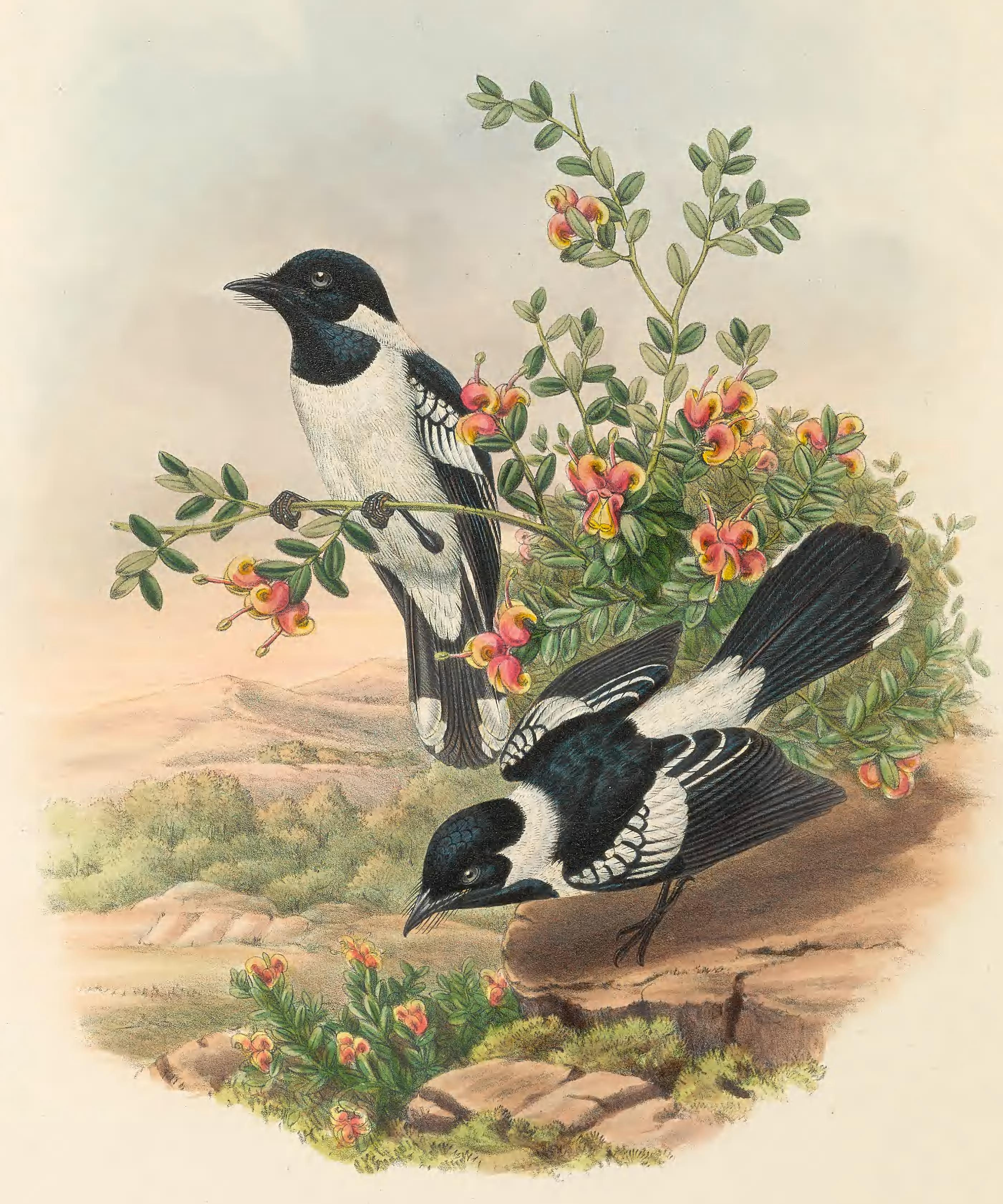
- Illustration by William Matthew Hart

Conservation status
- Least Concern (IUCN 3.1)

Scientific classification
- Kingdom: Animalia
- Phylum: Chordata
- Class: Aves
- Order: Passeriformes
- Family: Monarchidae
- Genus: Symposiachrus
- Species: S. vidua

Binomial name
- Symposiachrus vidua (Tristram, 1879)

Subspecies
- See text

Synonyms
- Monarcha vidua; Monarcha viduus; Piezorhynchus vidua; Symposiarchus vidua

= White-collared monarch =

Species of bird

The white-collared monarch (Symposiachrus vidua) is a species of bird in the family Monarchidae. It is found in the Solomon Islands of Ugi and Makira.

== Taxonomy and systematics ==
This species was originally described as belonging to the genus Piezorhynchus (a synonym for Myiagra) and subsequently classified in the genus Monarcha prior to being moved to Symposiachrus in 2009. Alternate names include the San Cristobal monarch and scaled monarch.

=== Subspecies ===
There are two subspecies recognized:

- S. v. squamulatus - (Tristram, 1882): Originally described as a separate species in the genus Piezorhynchus. Found on Ugi Island
- S. v. vidua - (Tristram, 1879): Found on Makira
