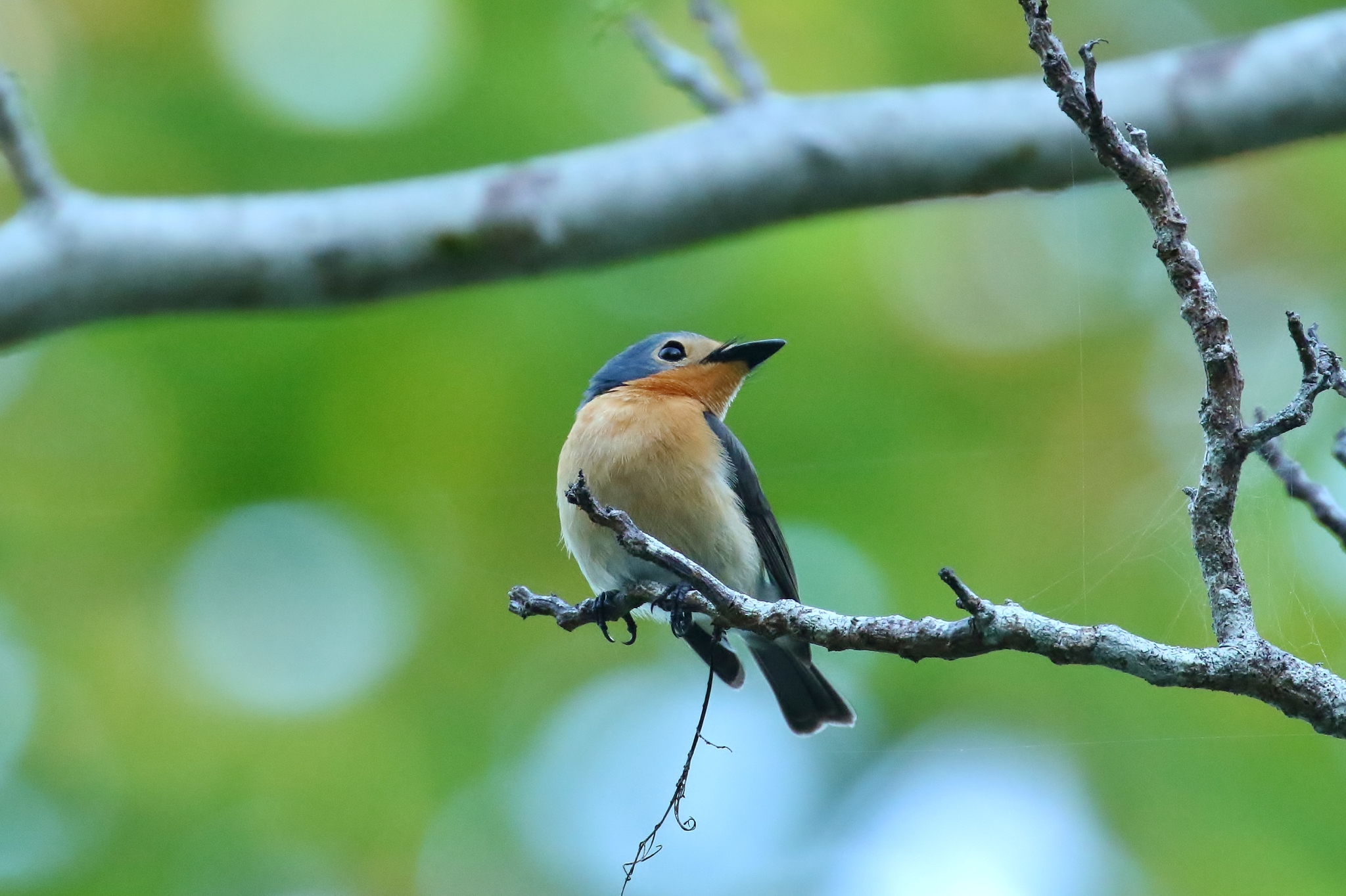

Conservation status
- Least Concern (IUCN 3.1)

Scientific classification
- Kingdom: Animalia
- Phylum: Chordata
- Class: Aves
- Order: Passeriformes
- Family: Monarchidae
- Genus: Myiagra
- Species: M. erythrops

Binomial name
- Myiagra erythrops Hartlaub & Finsch, 1868

Synonyms
- Myiagra oceanica erythrops

= Palau flycatcher =

Species of bird

The Palau flycatcher (Myiagra erythrops) is a species of bird in the family Monarchidae. It is endemic to Palau.

== Taxonomy and systematics ==
Some authorities consider the Palau flycatcher to be a subspecies of the oceanic flycatcher. Alternate names include mangrove flycatcher, Micronesian broadbill, Palau broadbill, Palau Myiagra flycatcher, rufous-faced flycatcher and rufous-faced Myiagra flycatcher.
