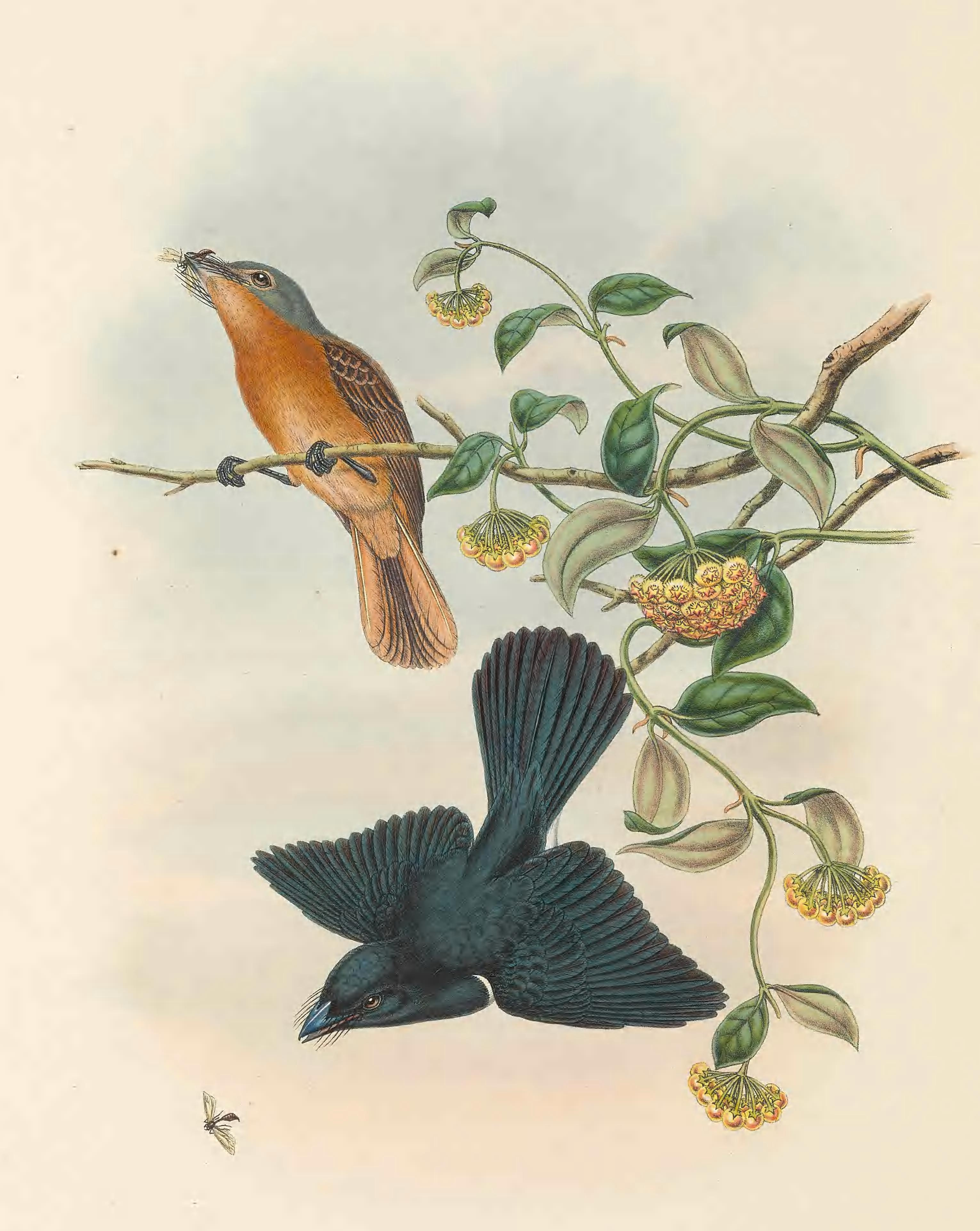
- Illustration by William Matthew Hart.

Conservation status
- Near Threatened (IUCN 3.1)

Scientific classification
- Kingdom: Animalia
- Phylum: Chordata
- Class: Aves
- Order: Passeriformes
- Family: Monarchidae
- Genus: Myiagra
- Species: M. cervinicauda

Binomial name
- Myiagra cervinicauda Tristram, 1879

= Makira flycatcher =

Species of bird

The Makira flycatcher (Myiagra cervinicauda) is a species of bird in the family Monarchidae. It is endemic to Solomon Islands. Its natural habitat is subtropical or tropical moist lowland forests. It is threatened by habitat loss.

Alternate names for the Makira flycatcher include Makira Myiagra, ochre-headed flycatcher, ochre-tailed flycatcher, red-tailed flycatcher, San Cristobal flycatcher and San Cristobal Myiagra flycatcher.
