= Steel-blue flycatcher =

- Female M. f. cinerea
- Male M. f. ferrocyanea

Conservation status
- Least Concern (IUCN 3.1)

Scientific classification
- Kingdom: Animalia
- Phylum: Chordata
- Class: Aves
- Order: Passeriformes
- Family: Monarchidae
- Genus: Myiagra
- Species: M. ferrocyanea

Binomial name
- Myiagra ferrocyanea Ramsay, 1879

Subspecies
- See text

Species of bird

The steel-blue flycatcher (Myiagra ferrocyanea) is a species of bird in the family Monarchidae. It is found in Papua New Guinea and Solomon Islands.

== Taxonomy and systematics ==
Alternate names for the steel-blue flycatcher include Solomons flycatcher, Solomons Myiagra flycatcher, Solomons satin flycatcher and steel-blue Myiagra.

=== Subspecies ===
Four subspecies are recognized:

- M. f. cinerea - (Mathews, 1928): Found on Bougainville Island and Buka Island
- M. f. ferrocyanea - Ramsay, 1879: Found on Santa Isabel Island, Choiseul Island and Guadalcanal
- M. f. feminina - Rothschild & Hartert, 1901: Originally described as a separate species. Found on New Georgia Islands
- M. f. malaitae - Mayr, 1931: Found on Malaita

=== Behavior and Ecology ===
The Steel-blue flycatcher (Myiagra ferrocyanea) exhibits a varied vocal repertoire that includes clear, melodious whistles used to communicate and establish territorial boundaries.
