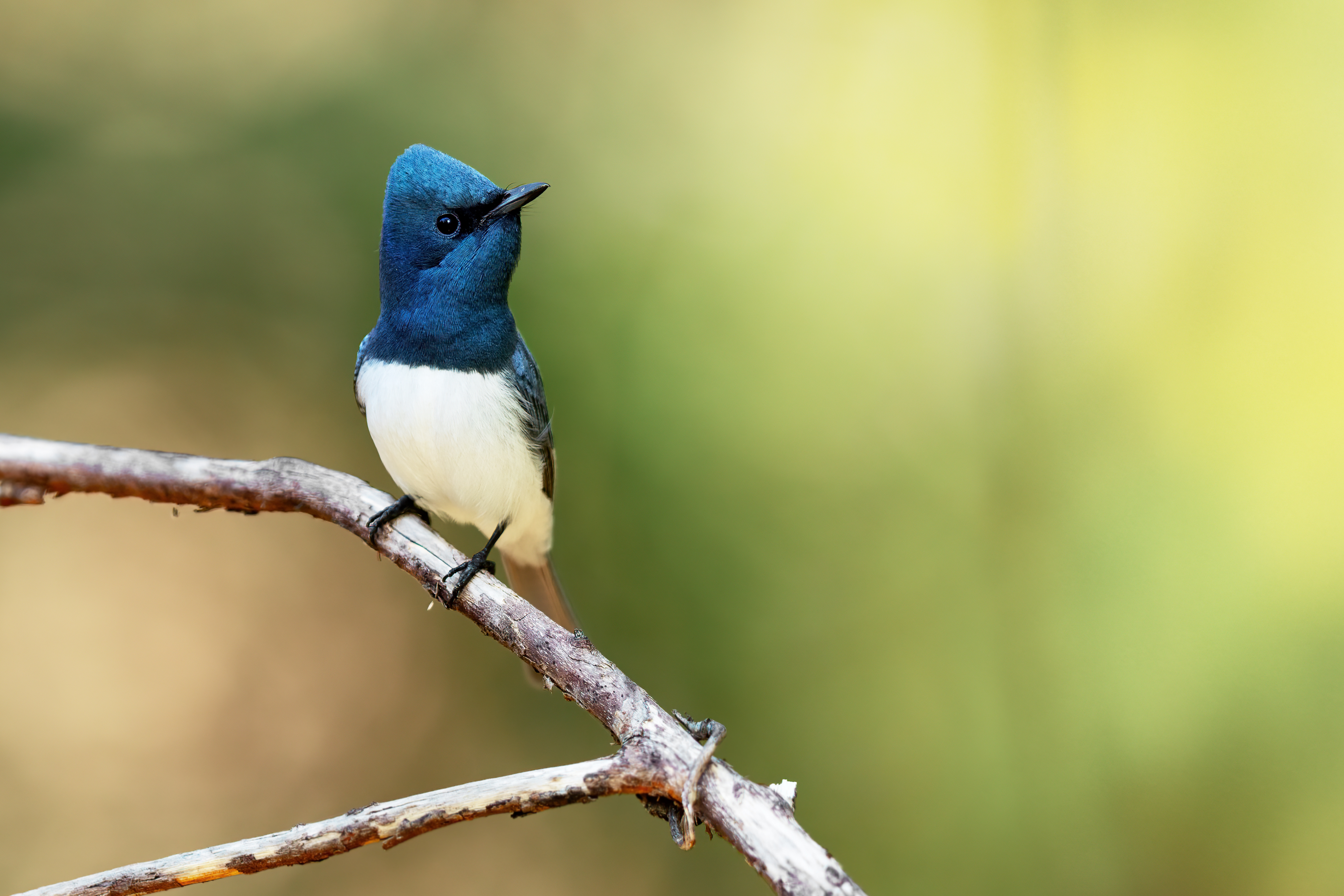
- Male, showing white breast
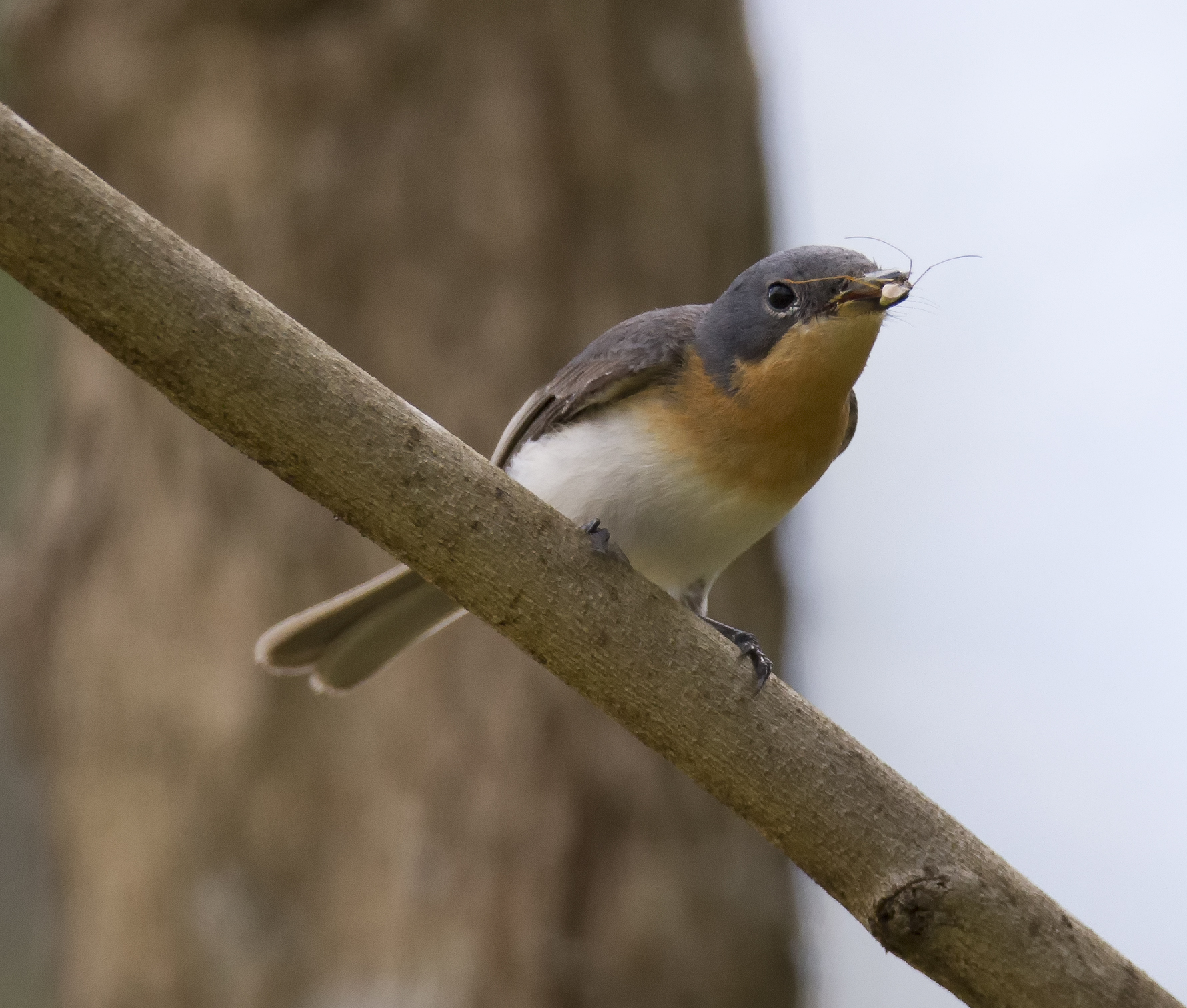
- Female, with prey

Conservation status
- Least Concern (IUCN 3.1)

Scientific classification
- Kingdom: Animalia
- Phylum: Chordata
- Class: Aves
- Order: Passeriformes
- Family: Monarchidae
- Genus: Myiagra
- Species: M. rubecula

Binomial name
- Myiagra rubecula (Latham, 1801)

Subspecies
- See text

Synonyms
- Todus rubecula

= Leaden flycatcher =

Species of bird

The leaden flycatcher (Myiagra rubecula) is a species of passerine bird in the family Monarchidae. Around 15 cm (6 in) in length, the male is lustrous azure with white underparts, while the female possesses leaden head, mantle and back and rufous throat and breast. It is found in eastern and northern Australia, Indonesia, and Papua New Guinea. Its natural habitat is subtropical or tropical mangrove forests in the northern parts of its range, in the south and inland it is eucalypt woodland.

== Taxonomy and systematics ==
The leaden flycatcher was first described by the English ornithologist John Latham in 1801, from an illustration of a female bird in the Watling drawings. He coined the English name "red-breasted tody" and classified it in the genus Todus. Its specific name, rubecula, comes from the Latin for robin. A local name around Sydney is frogbird, derived from its guttural call. Other variants of its common name include blue- or leaden-coloured flycatcher, leaden Myiagra and leaden Myiagra flycatcher.

The leaden flycatcher is a member of a group of birds termed monarch flycatchers. This group is considered either as a subfamily Monarchinae, together with the fantails as part of the drongo family Dicruridae, or as a family Monarchidae in its own right. They are not closely related to either their namesakes, the Old World flycatchers of the family Muscicapidae; early molecular research in the late 1980s and early 1990s revealed the monarchs belong to a large group of mainly Australasian birds known as the Corvida parvorder comprising many tropical and Australian passerines. More recently, the grouping has been refined somewhat as the monarchs have been classified in a 'Core corvine' group with the crows and ravens, shrikes, birds of paradise, fantails, drongos and mudnest builders.

=== Subspecies ===
There are six subspecies recognized:

- M. r. sciurorum - Rothschild & Hartert, 1918: Found on the D'Entrecasteaux Islands and the Louisiade Archipelago
- M. r. papuana - Rothschild & Hartert, 1918: Found on southern and south-eastern New Guinea, islands of the Torres Strait
- Pretty flycatcher (M. r. concinna) - Gould, 1848: Originally described as a separate species. Found in north-western and north-central Australia.
- M. r. okyri - Schodde & Mason, IJ, 1999: An unusual non-migratory form found on Cape York Peninsula (north-eastern Australia). The specific epithet is an anagram of yorki. The holotype was collected from Coen in northern Queensland.
- M. r. yorki - Mathews, 1912: Found in north-eastern and eastern Australia
- M. r. rubecula - (Latham, 1801): Found in south-eastern Australia.

== Description ==
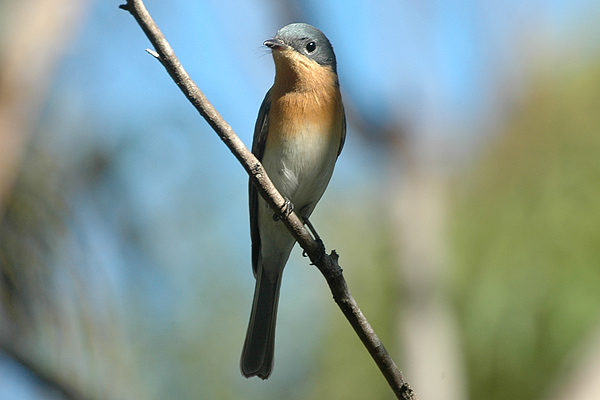
Female, showing rufous underparts Kobble Creek, SE Queensland

The leaden flycatcher is 14.5–16 cm (6-6½ in) long and weighs around 10–15 g. It is a shiny lead-grey in colour with a brownish tinge to the wings, a bluish black bill, black legs and dark brown iris. The male has darker grey lores, and a white breast and belly, while the female has an orange-tan throat and breast with a white belly. The juvenile resembles the adult female, but with paler wing-edges.

== Distribution and habitat ==
The leaden flycatcher is found from King Sound in northwestern Australia, across the Top End to Cape York, and then down the east coast to central-southern Victoria. It is rare in Tasmania. It is highly migratory within this range. Sclerophyll forest, rainforest margins, mangroves and coastal scrub are the preferred habitats.

== Behaviour ==
As its name suggests, the leaden flycatcher is insectivorous. A very active and agile bird, it hops between branches and catches insects in flight.

=== Breeding ===
Breeding season is September to February with one brood raised. The nest is a deep cup made of strips of bark and dry grass, woven together with spider webs and decorated with lichen, generally sited on a small branch well away from the trunk of a sizeable tree some 5–10 m above the ground. Two or three white eggs tinted bluish, greyish or lavender and splotched with dark grey-brown are laid measuring 17 mm x 14 mm. They have an unusual swollen oval shape. The species is parasitised by the brush cuckoo (Cacomantis variolosus). Both sexes incubate the eggs and brood the chicks, although the female undertakes slightly more of the duties and also incubates at night. Nesting success is low, with only 23% of nests successfully fledging a chick.

Male Rush Creek, SE Queensland
