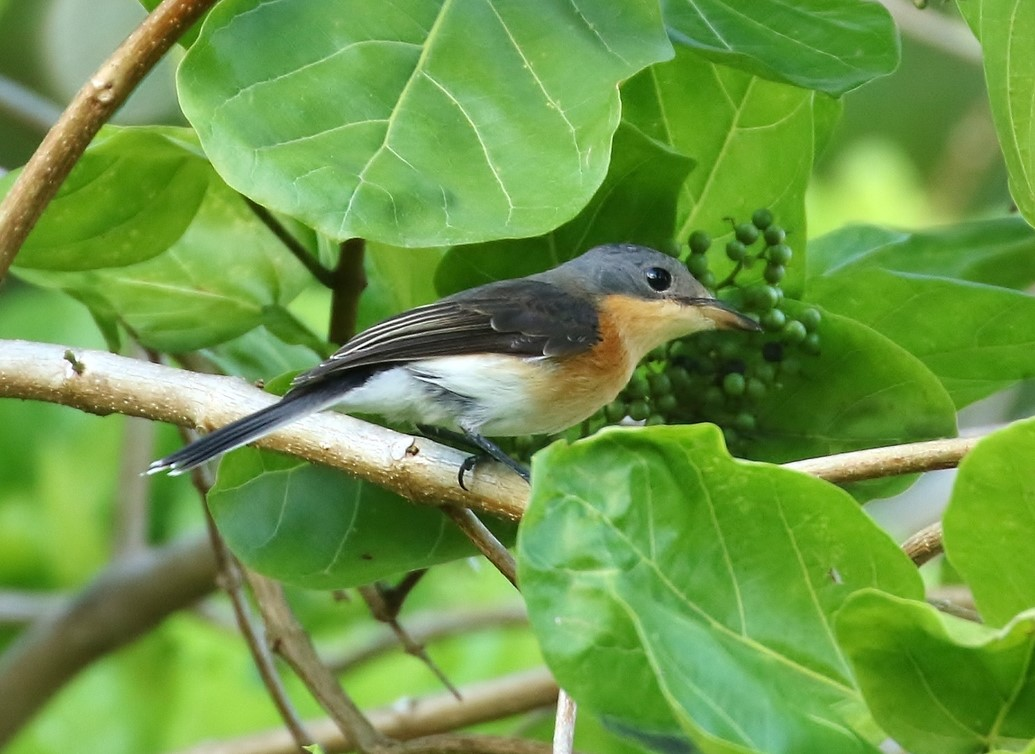

Conservation status
- Least Concern (IUCN 3.1)

Scientific classification
- Kingdom: Animalia
- Phylum: Chordata
- Class: Aves
- Order: Passeriformes
- Family: Monarchidae
- Genus: Myiagra
- Species: M. oceanica

Binomial name
- Myiagra oceanica Pucheran, 1853

= Chuuk flycatcher =

Species of bird

The Chuuk flycatcher (Myiagra oceanica), formerly sometimes known as the oceanic flycatcher, is a species of bird in the family Monarchidae. It is endemic to Micronesia and can be found on the Caroline Islands. The diversity of traits in the Oceanic flycatchers resulted from three waves of colonization in non-overlapping times, which led to situ specification events on Micronesian islands.

== Taxonomy and systematics ==
Some authorities consider the Palau flycatcher and the Guam flycatcher to be subspecies of the oceanic flycatcher. Alternate names include the Chuuk flycatcher, Micronesian broadbill, Micronesian flycatcher, Micronesian Myiagra, Micronesian Myiagra flycatcher, Truk broadbill, Truk flycatcher, Truk Island flycatcher, Truk Island Myiagra flycatcher and Truk Myiagra flycatcher.
