= Hooded monarch =

Conservation status
- Least Concern (IUCN 3.1)

Scientific classification
- Kingdom: Animalia
- Phylum: Chordata
- Class: Aves
- Order: Passeriformes
- Family: Monarchidae
- Genus: Symposiachrus
- Species: S. manadensis

Binomial name
- Symposiachrus manadensis (Quoy & Gaimard, 1832)

Synonyms
- Monarcha manadensis; Muscicapa manadensis; Symposiarchus manadensis

Species of bird

The hooded monarch (Symposiachrus manadensis) is a species of bird in the family Monarchidae. It is found on New Guinea. Its natural habitat is subtropical or tropical moist lowland forests. It is identified as jet black and with a white belly and feeds on small invertebrates and larvae.

== Taxonomy and systematics ==
The hooded monarch was described by the French zoologists Jean Quoy and Joseph Gaimard in 1832 from a specimen which they mistakenly claimed had been collected in Manado on the island of Célèbes (now Sulawesi). They coined the binomial name, Muscicapa manadensis. (Note: Although the volume of the Voyage de la corvette l'Astrolabe has 1830 on the title page it was not published until 1832.) In 1941 the type locality was redesignated as Manokwari in New Guinea.

The hooded monarch was originally described in the genus Muscicapa and then placed in Monarcha until moved to Symposiachrus in 2009. Alternate names include the black-and-white monarch, black-and-white monarch flycatcher and white-bellied monarch.

Superspecies Monarcha manadensis comprises 13 mainly black and white or “pied” species and ranges from the Western Islands of the Lesser Sundas into parts of Micronesia, and throughout New Guinea, tropical Australia, and the Solomons. It has a generation length of 3.27 years, with a decreasing population trend.

== Physical Characteristics ==
The Hooded Monarch has a black back with a white belly that stretches from its upper chest to lower tail. The sexes are similar in appearance and the juveniles are similar to adults but reflect a more greyish-brown color. Adult Hooded Monarchs are recorded to have long tail feathers and a bushy crest.

== Diet and Habitat ==
As of 2024 the Hooded Monarch population is estimated to cover 950,000 km^{2} and are found between elevations up to 1,200m. Hooded Monarchs are recorded to stay inside of tropical and subtropical habitats, when foraging Hooded Monarchs are observed to hide within the middle level and underbrush of the forest . Hooded Monarchs have been recorded in the Lowlands and Hill Forest of New Guinea and Indonesia and have been observed to eat small invertebrates and larvae. They are irregularly distributed and may be absent from habitats identical to their own habitat due to their resident behaviors. Hooded Monarch sightings are most numerous in flat areas of their habitat.

== Behaviors ==
Hooded Monarchs are observed to be solitary; most interactions that have been recorded between Hooded Monarchs were during their breeding season. With the exception that they have been recorded in mixed species flocks foraging for invertebrates and larvae In a mixed species flock setting Hooded Monarchs have been recorded associating with Timalidae and Pitohui uropygialis. Hooded Monarchs are classified as “residents” as they have not been recorded to migrate far from a specific location they make monotone whistles sounding like, “swee dee dee” or “dee-yuu, dewi dewi”. They can also make a single low-pitched note that has been compared to the sound of a Symposiachrus guttula.

== Breeding Habits ==
The breeding season for Hooded Monarchs occurs between August and September. These nests are built from dark plant fibers and can be seen 1-1.65 m above ground. The eggs found are dark brown with darker spots at the larger end of the egg.
