= Mussau flycatcher =

Conservation status
- Vulnerable (IUCN 3.1)

Scientific classification
- Kingdom: Animalia
- Phylum: Chordata
- Class: Aves
- Order: Passeriformes
- Family: Monarchidae
- Genus: Myiagra
- Species: M. hebetior

Binomial name
- Myiagra hebetior (Hartert, 1924)

Synonyms
- Monarcha hebetior

Species of bird

The Mussau flycatcher (Myiagra hebetior) is a species of bird in the family Monarchidae. It is endemic to Mussau Island in the Bismarck Archipelago.

Its natural habitats are subtropical or tropical moist lowland forests and subtropical or tropical moist montane forests.

== Taxonomy and systematics ==
The Mussau flycatcher was originally described in the genus Monarcha. Alternate names include dull flycatcher, dull monarch, Hartert's flycatcher, island flycatcher, lesser shining flycatcher, and little shining flycatcher.

The velvet flycatcher (M. eichorni), which is found on New Hanover, New Ireland & New Britain, and the Dyaul flycatcher (M. cervinicolor), which is endemic to Dyaul Island, were both formerly considered subspecies, but were reclassified as distinct species by the IOC in 2021. The three species were formerly grouped together as the velvet flycatcher under the scientific name M. hebetior.

== Threats ==
The Mussau flycatcher is threatened by habitat loss due to logging and is considered Vulnerable by the IUCN.
