= Island flycatcher =

Island flycatcher may refer to several species of birds:

- Turquoise flycatcher, found in Indonesia and the Philippines
- Velvet flycatcher, endemic to Mussau Island in the Bismarck Archipelago
