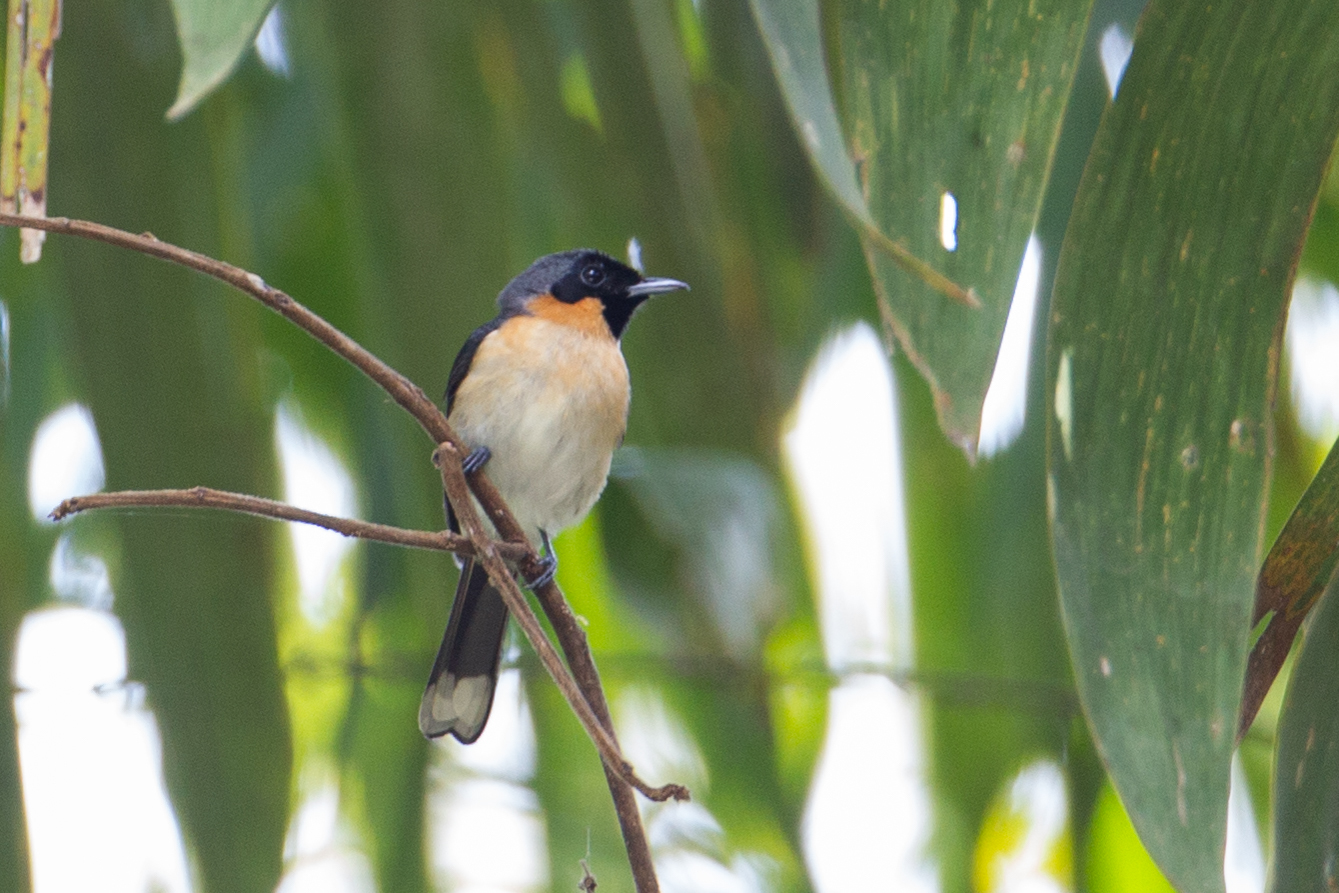

Scientific classification
- Kingdom: Animalia
- Phylum: Chordata
- Class: Aves
- Order: Passeriformes
- Family: Monarchidae
- Genus: Symposiachrus
- Species: S. bimaculatus

Binomial name
- Symposiachrus bimaculatus (Gray, GR, 1861)

Subspecies
- See text

Synonyms
- Monarcha trivirgatus bimaculatus

= Moluccan monarch =

Species of bird

The Moluccan monarch (Symposiachrus bimaculatus) is a species of bird in the family Monarchidae. It is found in Indonesia. Its natural habitats are subtropical or tropical moist lowland forests and subtropical or tropical moist montane forests.

== Taxonomy and systematics ==
This species was formerly placed in the genus Monarcha until moved to Symposiachrus in 2009. Some authorities consider the Moluccan monarch as a subspecies (S. trivirgatus bimaculatus) of the spectacled monarch. The subspecies nigrimentum was formerly considered a subspecies of the spectacled monarch.

=== Subspecies ===
There are three subspecies recognized:

- S. b. bimaculatus - (Gray, GR, 1861): found on Morotai, Halmahera and the Bacan Islands (northern Moluccas)
- S. b. diadematus - (Salvadori, 1878): found on Bisa and Obi Island (northern Moluccas)
- S. t. nigrimentum - (Gray, GR, 1861): Seram & Ambon (east-central Moluccas), Gorong & Watubela (southeastern Moluccas)
