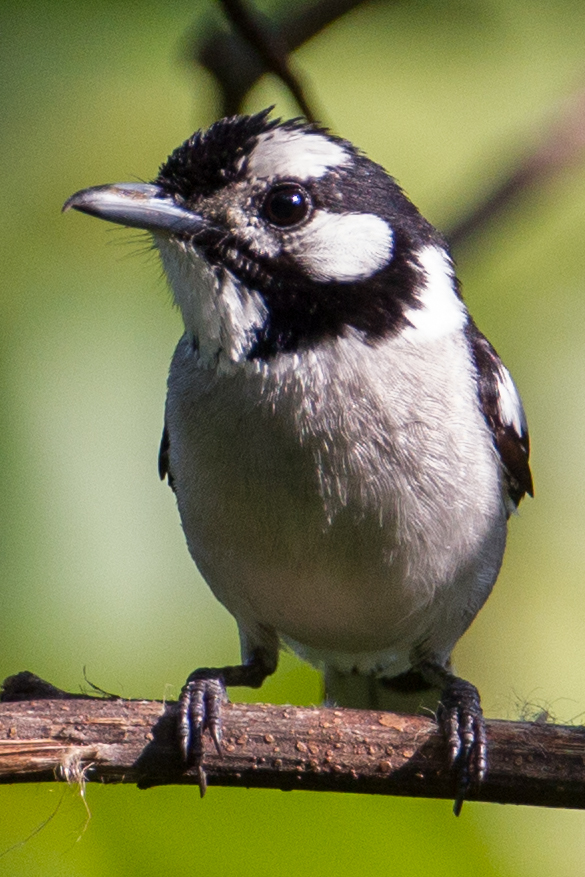

Conservation status
- Least Concern (IUCN 3.1)

Scientific classification
- Kingdom: Animalia
- Phylum: Chordata
- Class: Aves
- Order: Passeriformes
- Family: Monarchidae
- Genus: Carterornis
- Species: C. pileatus

Binomial name
- Carterornis pileatus (Salvadori, 1878)

Subspecies
- See text

Synonyms
- Monarcha leucotis pileatus; Monarcha pileatus

= White-naped monarch =

Species of bird

The white-naped monarch (Carterornis pileatus) is a species of bird in the family Monarchidae. It is endemic to Indonesia, where it occurs in the Maluku Islands. Its natural habitat is subtropical or tropical moist lowland forests.

== Taxonomy and systematics ==
This species was formerly placed in the genus Monarcha until moved to Carterornis in 2009. Some authorities have considered the white-naped monarch to be a subspecies of the white-eared monarch.

=== Subspecies ===
There are two subspecies recognized:

- Carterornis pileatus pileatus - (Salvadori, 1878): Found on Halmahera
- Carterornis pileatus buruensis - (Meyer, AB, 1884): Originally considered as a separate species in the genus Monarcha. Found on Buru.

The Tanimbar monarch (C. castus), found on the Tanimbar Islands, was originally described as a separate species in the genus Monarcha, reclassified as a subspecies of C. pileatus, and again reclassified as a distinct species within Carterornis by the International Ornithological Congress in 2021.
