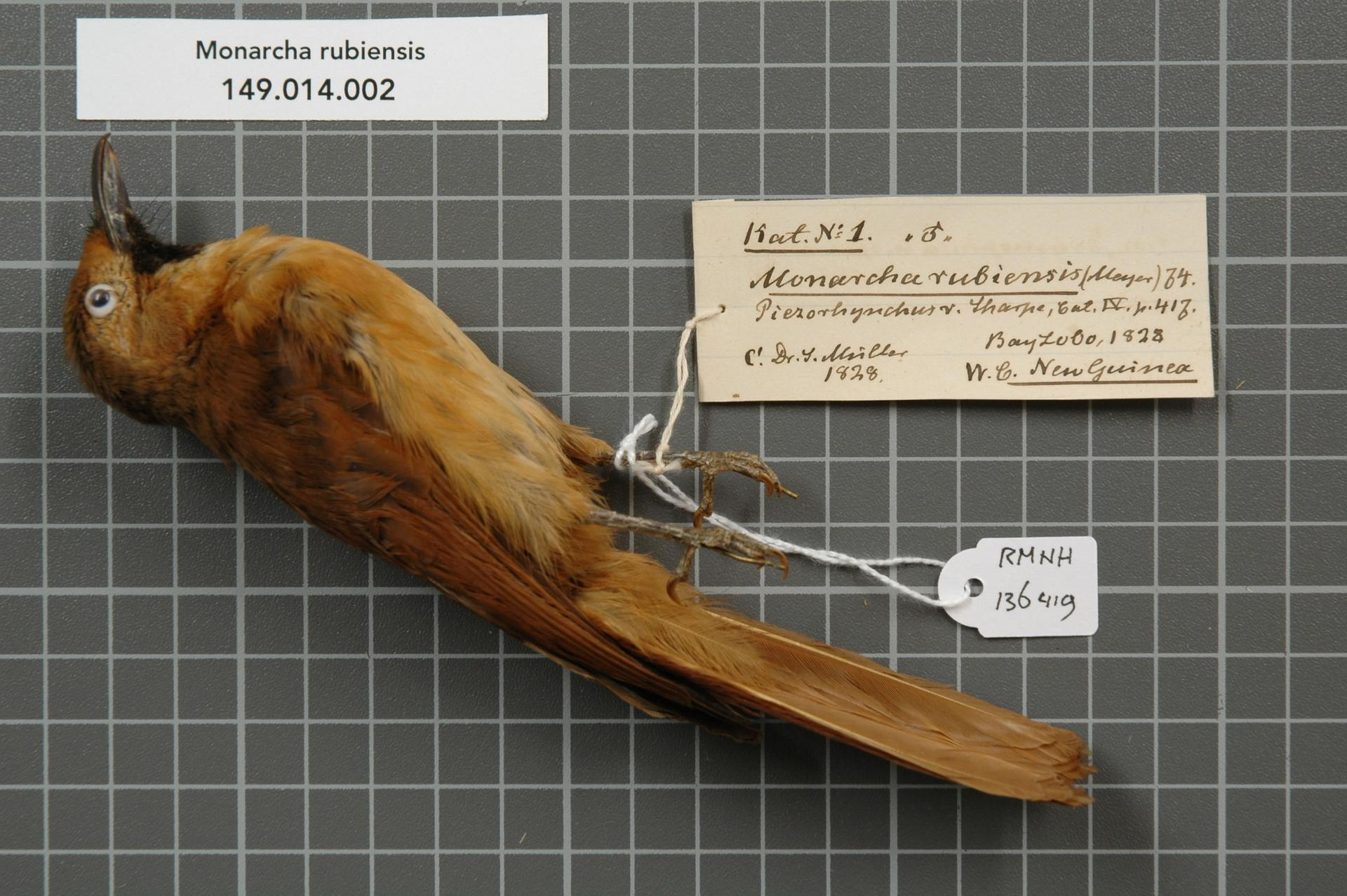

Conservation status
- Least Concern (IUCN 3.1)

Scientific classification
- Kingdom: Animalia
- Phylum: Chordata
- Class: Aves
- Order: Passeriformes
- Family: Monarchidae
- Genus: Symposiachrus
- Species: S. rubiensis

Binomial name
- Symposiachrus rubiensis (Meyer, 1874)

Synonyms
- Monarcha rubiensis; Tchitrea rubiensis

= Rufous monarch =

Species of bird

The rufous monarch (Symposiachrus rubiensis), or rufous monarch flycatcher, is a species of bird in the family Monarchidae found in western New Guinea. Its natural habitat is subtropical or tropical moist lowland forests.

== Taxonomy and systematics ==
The rufous monarch was originally described in the genus Tchitrea. The species was later reclassified in Monarcha for many years. In 2016, the IUCN Red List and BirdLife International reclassified it into Symposiachrus, and the International Ornithological Congress followed suit in 2022.
