= Cyrtodactylus tanahjampea =

Scientific classification
- Kingdom: Animalia
- Phylum: Chordata
- Class: Reptilia
- Order: Squamata
- Suborder: Gekkota
- Family: Gekkonidae
- Genus: Cyrtodactylus
- Species: C. tanahjampea

Binomial name
- Cyrtodactylus tanahjampea Riyanto, Hamidy, & McGuire, 2018

Species of lizard

Cyrtodactylus tanahjampea, also known as the Tanahjampea bent-toed gecko, is a species of gecko endemic to Tanah Jampea Island in Indonesia.
