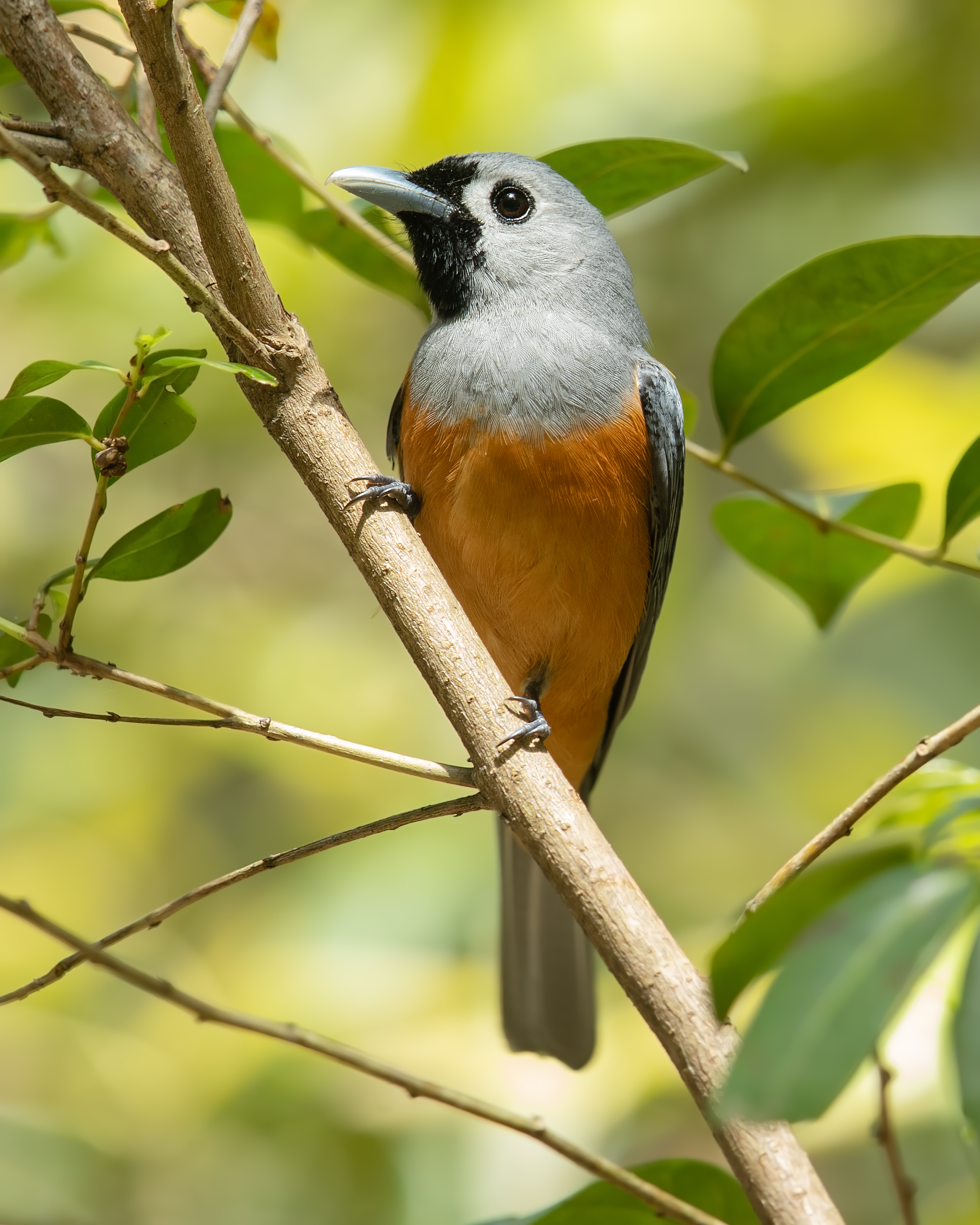

Conservation status
- Least Concern (IUCN 3.1)

Scientific classification
- Kingdom: Animalia
- Phylum: Chordata
- Class: Aves
- Order: Passeriformes
- Family: Monarchidae
- Genus: Monarcha
- Species: M. melanopsis

Binomial name
- Monarcha melanopsis (Vieillot, 1818)

Synonyms
- Muscicapa melanopsis; Muscipeta carinata, Swainson, 1823; Monarcha melanopsis pallidus, Mathews, 1916

= Black-faced monarch =

Species of bird

The black-faced monarch (Monarcha melanopsis) is a passerine songbird in the family Monarchidae found along the eastern seaboard of Australia, and also New Guinea (where most birds migrate to during the austral winter; May to August).

== Taxonomy and systematics ==
The black-faced monarch was originally described as Muscicapa melanopsis by Louis Pierre Vieillot in 1818 from a specimen collected in New South Wales. The species is now placed in the genus Monarcha that was introduced by the naturalists Nicholas Vigors and Thomas Horsfield in 1827. The specific name is from the Ancient Greek words melas "black" and ops "face". English naturalist William Swainson described it in 1823 as Muscipeta carinata, or "keel-billed flycatcher", unaware of Vieillot's earlier description. In his 1848 work The Birds of Australia, John Gould called it Monarcha carinata "Carinated flycatcher".

Australian amateur ornithologist Gregory Mathews described a paler specimen from Cape York as a distinct subspecies pallidus, though this was not recognised subsequently.

"Black-faced monarch" has been designated as the official common name for the species by the International Ornithologists' Union (IOC). Alternate names include the "black-faced flycatcher", "carinated flycatcher", "grey-winged monarch" (particularly in New Guinea to distinguish from black-winged monarch), "grey-winged monarch flycatcher" and "pearly-winged monarch".

The species is monotypic: no subspecies are recognised. Within the genus, it is most closely related to the black-winged monarch (Monarcha frater).

== Description ==
The black-faced monarch is grey, with rufous underparts and mature birds have a black patch on the face.

== Distribution and habitat ==
The preferred habitat is rainforest and wet forest.
