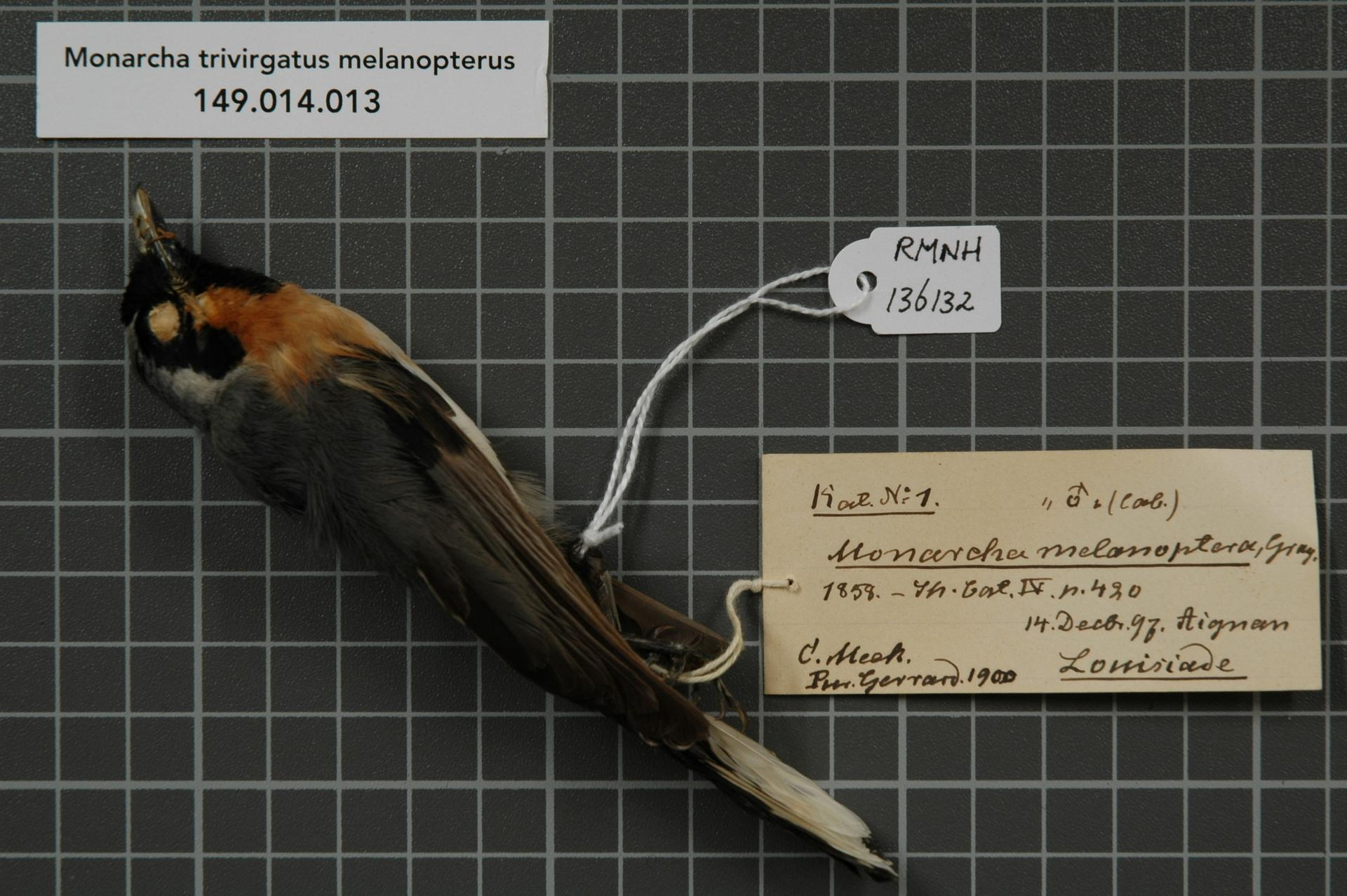

Scientific classification
- Domain: Eukaryota
- Kingdom: Animalia
- Phylum: Chordata
- Class: Aves
- Order: Passeriformes
- Family: Monarchidae
- Genus: Symposiachrus
- Species: S. melanopterus

Binomial name
- Symposiachrus melanopterus (GR Gray, 1858)

= Louisiade monarch =

Species of bird

The Louisiade monarch (Symposiachrus melanopterus) is a species of bird in the family Monarchidae endemic to Papua New Guinea. It is found in the Louisiade Archipelago. Its natural habitats are subtropical or tropical moist lowland forest and subtropical or tropical moist shrubland. It is threatened by habitat loss.

== Taxonomy and systematics ==
The species was originally described as a species by George Robert Gray as Monarcha melanoptera, later as a subspecies of the spectacled monarch.
