= Vella Lavella monarch =

Conservation status
- Not evaluated (IUCN 3.1)

Scientific classification
- Kingdom: Animalia
- Phylum: Chordata
- Class: Aves
- Order: Passeriformes
- Family: Monarchidae
- Genus: Symposiachrus
- Species: S. nigrotectus

Binomial name
- Symposiachrus nigrotectus (Hartert, 1908)

Species of bird

The Vella Lavella monarch (Symposiachrus nigrotectus), is a passerine bird in the monarch flycatcher family Monarchidae. It is endemic to the islands of Ranongga and Vella Lavella in the Solomon Islands archipelago. It was formerly considered as conspecific with the Kolombangara monarch.

== Taxonomy ==
The Vella Lavella monarch was formally described in 1908 by the German ornithologist Ernst Hartert based on a specimen collected on the island of Vella Lavella in the Solomon Islands archipelago. He coined the trinomial name Monarcha brodiei nigrotectus, where Monarcha brodiei Ramsay, EP, 1879 is a junior synonym of Monarcha barbatus barbatus Ramsay, EP, 1879, the Solomons monarch. The Vella Lavella monarch is now placed in the genus Symposiachrus. It was previously considered to be a subspecies of the Kolombangara monarch (Symposiachrus browni) but is now treated as a separate species based on differences in plumage and DNA sequences. The specific epithet nigrotectus combines the Latin niger meaning "black" with tectus meaning "covered" or "concealed".

Two subspecies are recognised:

- S. n. ganongae (Mayr, 1935) – Ranongga (northwest New Georgia group, central west Solomon Islands)
- S. n. nigrotectus (Hartert, EJO, 1908) – Vella Lavella (north New Georgia group, central west Solomon Islands)
