= Grapow =

Grapow is a surname. Notable people with the surname include:

- Hermann Grapow (1885–1967), German Egyptologist
- Max von Grapow (1861–1924), German Admiral
- Roland Grapow (born 1959), German guitarist
