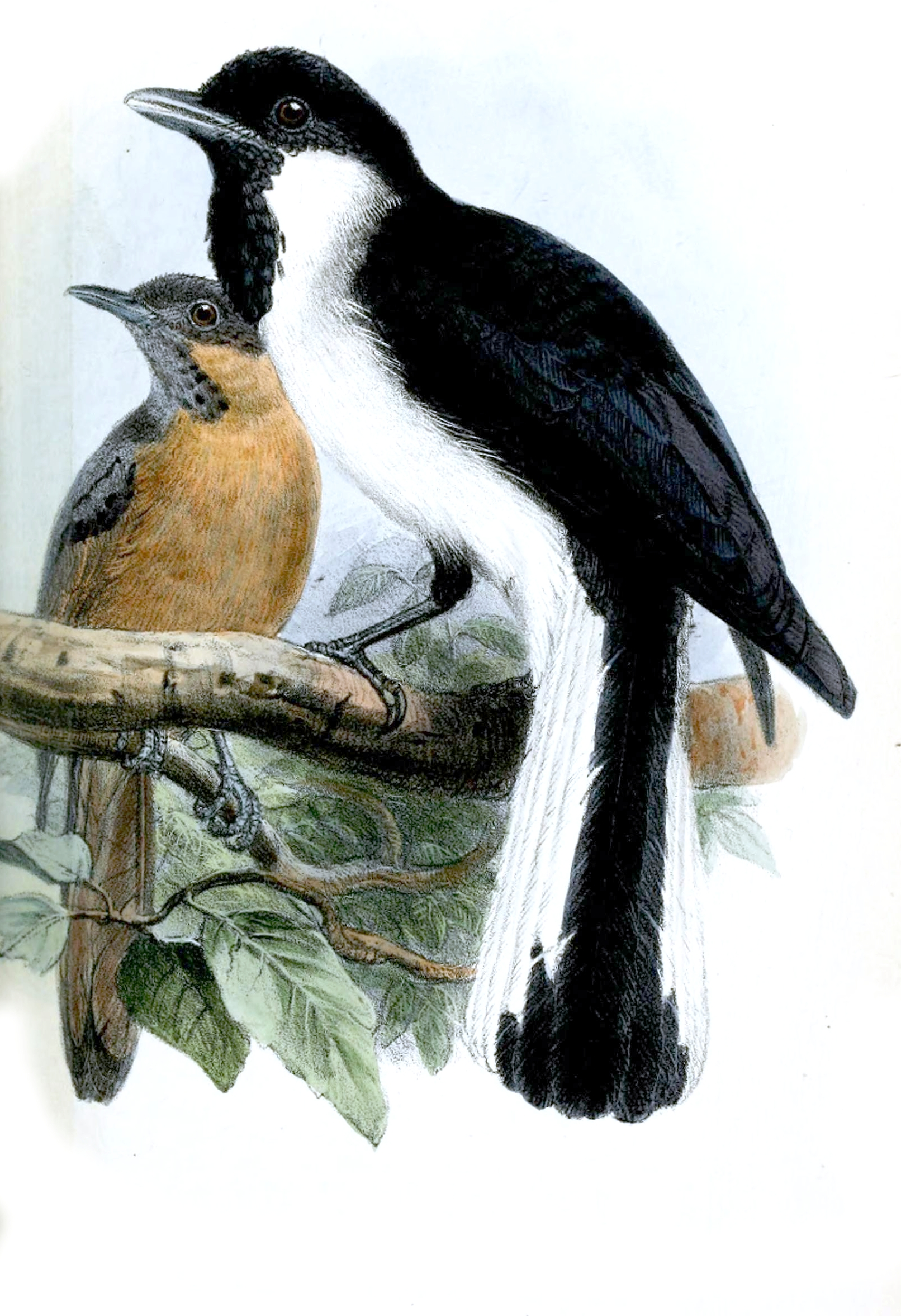
- Adult (right) and immature (left)
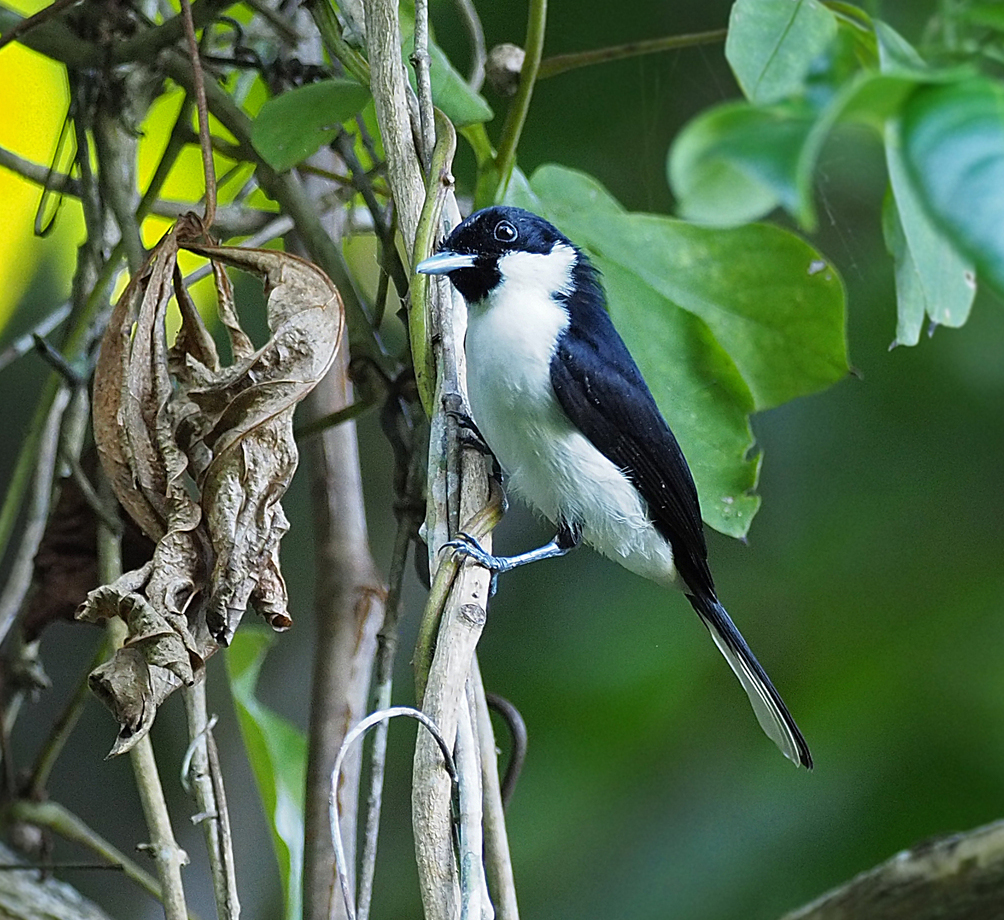

Conservation status
- Least Concern (IUCN 3.1)

Scientific classification
- Kingdom: Animalia
- Phylum: Chordata
- Class: Aves
- Order: Passeriformes
- Family: Monarchidae
- Genus: Symposiachrus
- Species: S. loricatus

Binomial name
- Symposiachrus loricatus (Wallace, 1863)

Synonyms
- Monarcha leucurus loricatus; Monarcha loricata; Monarcha loricatus; Symposiarchus loricatus

= Buru monarch =

Species of bird

The Buru monarch (Symposiachrus loricatus) is a species of bird in the family Monarchidae. It is endemic to Indonesia.

== Taxonomy and systematics ==
This species was formerly placed in the genus Monarcha until moved to Symposiachrus in 2009. Some authorities have considered the black-tipped monarch to be a subspecies of the Kai monarch. Alternate names include Buru Island monarch and black-tipped monarch.

== Distribution and habitat ==
The Buru monarch is found in the southern Moluccas. Its natural habitats are subtropical or tropical moist lowland forests and subtropical or tropical moist montane forests.

== Status ==
The species occupies an area of larger than 20,000 km^{2} (7,700 sq mi) and have a stable population of above 10,000, and thus are not considered as threatened.
