= Adriaan Cornelis Valentin van Bemmel =

Dutch zoologist, conservationist and zoo director

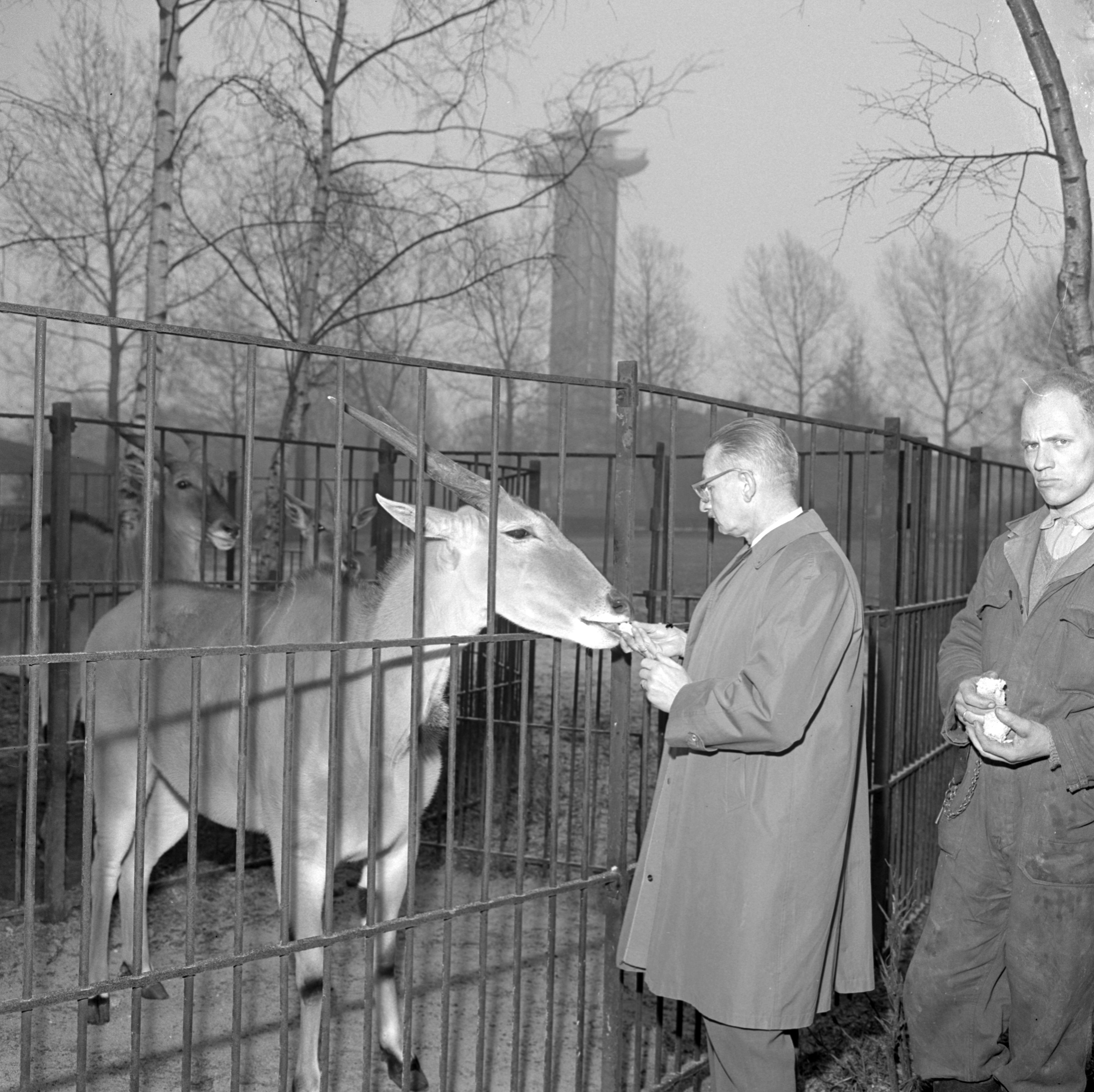
Dr. Van Bemmel feeding a Common eland, 1964

Adriaan Cornelis Valentin van Bemmel (3 May 1908 – 20 October 1990) was a Dutch zoologist, conservationist and patron of the Natural History Museum Rotterdam and director of the Blijdorp zoo.

Van Bemmel was born in Beverwijk where he received his early education. He then studied biology at the University of Amsterday, receiving a master's degree in 1937. He became a zoologist at the museum in Buitenzorg in Dutch Java and was held prisoner of war in 1941 by the Japanese. The returned to the Netherlands in 1951 and received a doctorate in 1952 and became a conservation consultant at the Staatsbosbeheer. In 1957 he became a deputy director of the Blijdorp zoo in Rotterdam and served as its direction from 1961 to 1968. He described the bird species Symposiachrus boanensis and Zosterops dehaani and took a special interest in the smaller deer. A subspecies of sparrowhawk, Accipiter virgatus vanbemmeli, was named after him by K.H. Voous in 1950.
