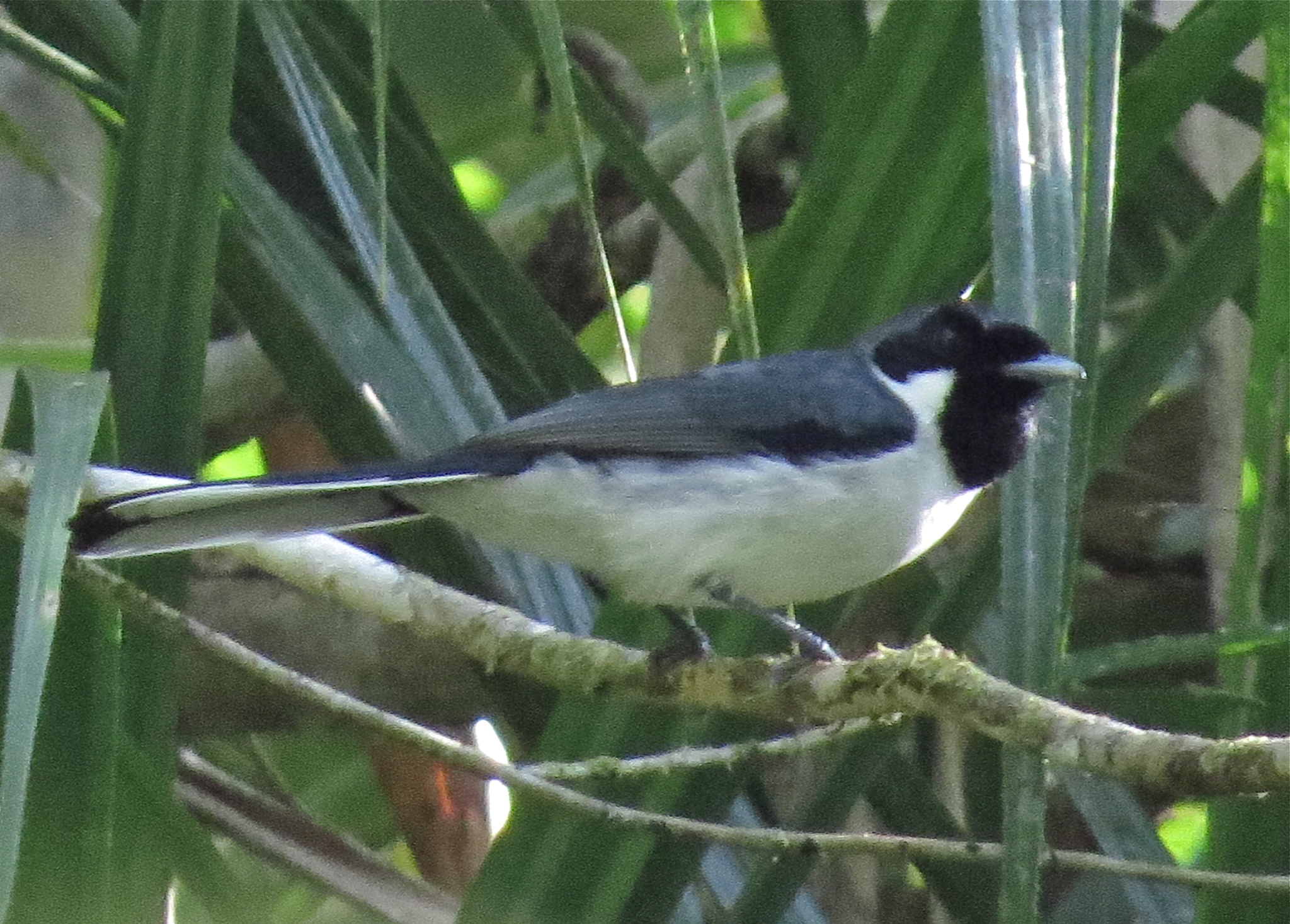

Conservation status
- Endangered (IUCN 3.1)

Scientific classification
- Kingdom: Animalia
- Phylum: Chordata
- Class: Aves
- Order: Passeriformes
- Family: Monarchidae
- Genus: Symposiachrus
- Species: S. sacerdotum

Binomial name
- Symposiachrus sacerdotum (Mees, 1973)

Synonyms
- Monarcha sacerdotum; Symposiarchus sacerdotum

= Flores monarch =

Species of bird

The Flores monarch (Symposiachrus sacerdotum) is a species of bird in the family Monarchidae. It is endemic to the western half of the island of Flores in Indonesia.

Its natural habitat is subtropical or tropical moist lowland forests between 350m and 1,000m in altitude. The Flores monarch has an estimated population of about 2,500-9,999 individuals, but its numbers are presumed to be decreasing. It is threatened by habitat loss and habitat fragmentation.

== Taxonomy and systematics ==
This species was originally placed in the genus Monarcha until moved to Symposiachrus in 2009. Alternate names include Flores mountain monarch, Mees's monarch, Mencke's monarch and Mussau Island monarch.
