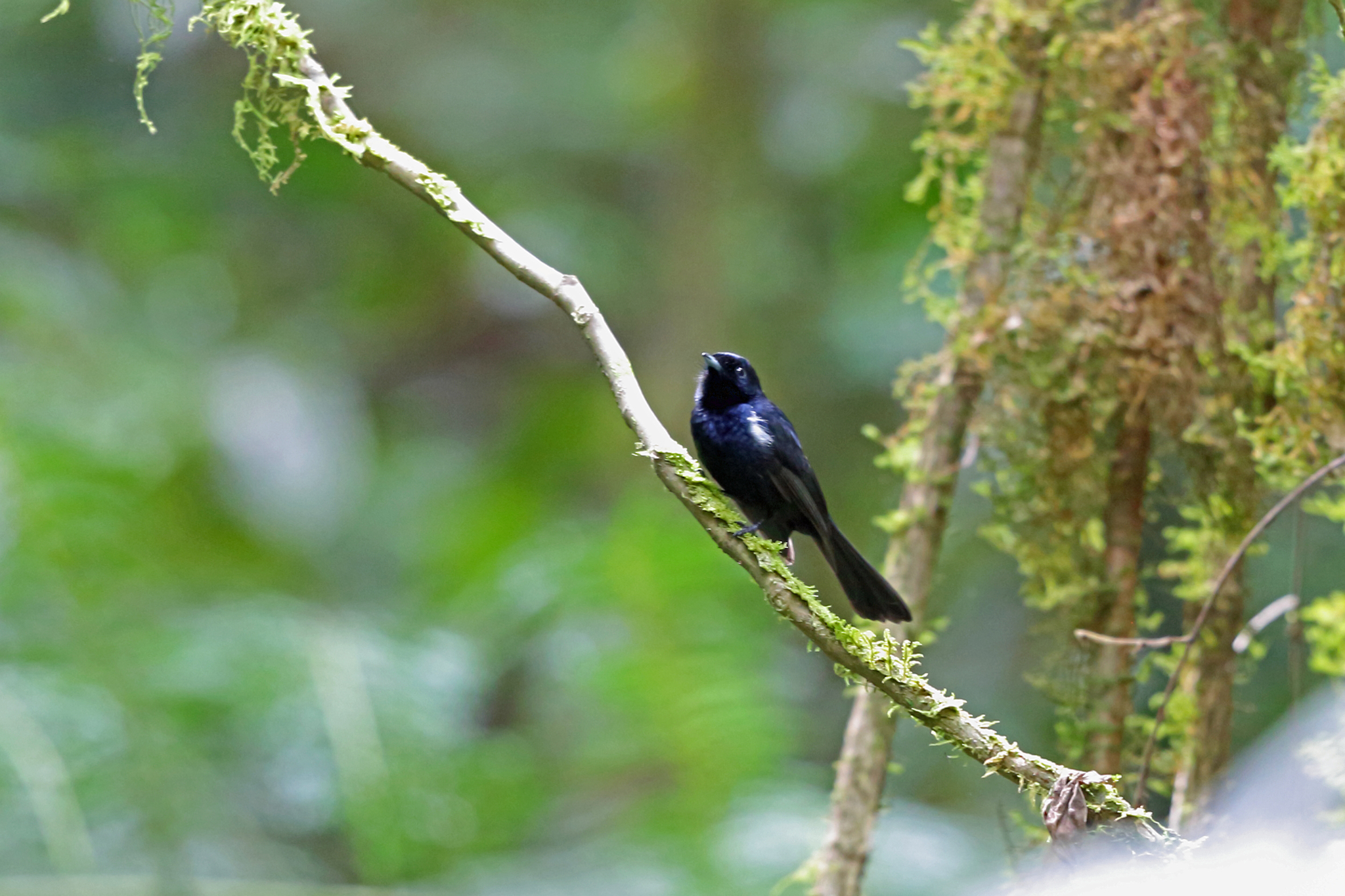

Conservation status
- Least Concern (IUCN 3.1)

Scientific classification
- Kingdom: Animalia
- Phylum: Chordata
- Class: Aves
- Order: Passeriformes
- Family: Monarchidae
- Genus: Symposiachrus
- Species: S. axillaris

Binomial name
- Symposiachrus axillaris (Salvadori, 1876)

Subspecies
- See text

Synonyms
- Monarcha axillaris; Symposiarchus axillaris

= Black monarch =

Species of bird

The black monarch (Symposiachrus axillaris) is a species of bird in the family Monarchidae. It is found in the New Guinea Highlands. Its natural habitats are subtropical or tropical moist lowland forest and subtropical or tropical moist montane forest.

== Taxonomy and systematics ==
This species was formerly placed in the genus Monarcha until moved to Symposiachrus in 2009. Alternate names include the black monarch flycatcher, fantail monarch and fantailed monarch.

=== Subspecies ===
There are two subspecies recognized:

- S. a. axillaris - (Salvadori, 1876): Found in north-western New Guinea
- S. a. fallax - (Ramsay, EP, 1885): Originally described as a separate species in the genus Rhipidura. Found in west-central to south-eastern New Guinea and Goodenough Island (D'Entrecasteaux Archipelago)
