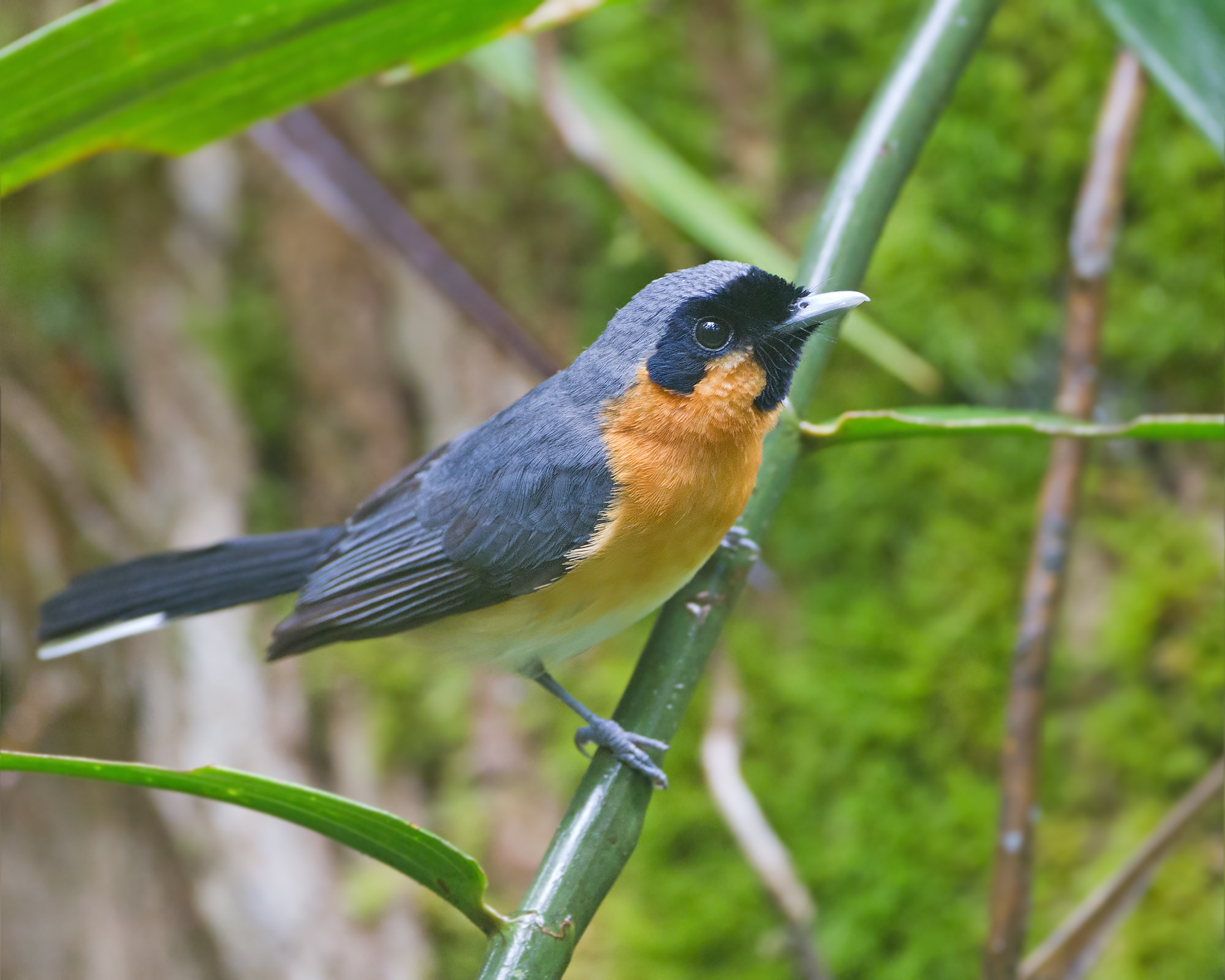
- Spectacled monarch (Symposiachrus trivirgatus)

Scientific classification
- Kingdom: Animalia
- Phylum: Chordata
- Class: Aves
- Order: Passeriformes
- Family: Monarchidae
- Genus: Symposiachrus; Bonaparte, 1854

Type species
- Drymophila trivirgata Temminck, 1826

Synonyms
- Symposiarchus

= Symposiachrus =

Genus of birds

Symposiachrus is a genus of birds in the family Monarchidae. Most species are endemic to islands in Melanesia but the spectacled monarch is widely distributed and occurs in parts of Indonesia and western Australia. The genus was previously lumped together in the genus Monarcha.

== Taxonomy and systematics ==
Based on the results of a molecular phylogenetic study published in 2005, the genus Monarcha was split and 19 species moved to the resurrected genus Symposiachrus that had been introduced by the French naturalist Charles Lucien Bonaparte in 1854 with the spectacled monarch (Symposiachrus trivirgatus) as the type species. The genus name Symposiachrus combines the Ancient Greek συν/sun meaning "together", ποσις/posis meaning "husband" and αχρως/akhrōs meaning "pallid".

The genus Symposiachrus contains the following 23 species:

Image	Common name	Scientific name	Distribution
	Black monarch	Symposiachrus axillaris	New Guinea.
	Spot-winged monarch	Symposiachrus guttula	New Guinea.
	Banda Sea monarch (formerly Black-bibbed monarch)	Symposiachrus mundus	Tanimbar Islands.
	Flores monarch	Symposiachrus sacerdotum	Flores in Indonesia.
	Louisiade monarch	Symposiachrus melanopterus	Papua New Guinea.
	Boano monarch	Symposiachrus boanensis	Boano, Maluku islands.
	Spectacled monarch	Symposiachrus trivirgatus	Australia, Indonesia, and Papua New Guinea.
	Moluccan monarch	Symposiachrus bimaculatus	Indonesia.
	Kai monarch	Symposiachrus leucurus	Kai Islands.
	Tanahjampea monarch	Symposiachrus everetti	Tanahjampea, Selayar Islands
	Buru monarch	Symposiachrus loricatus	Moluccas
	Kofiau monarch	Symposiachrus julianae	Kofiau in Indonesia.
	Biak monarch	Symposiachrus brehmii	Biak Island, Indonesia.
	Hooded monarch	Symposiachrus manadensis	New Guinea.
	Manus monarch	Symposiachrus infelix	Admiralty Islands of Papua New Guinea.
	Mussau monarch	Symposiachrus menckei	Bismarck Archipelago of Papua New Guinea.
	Bismarck monarch	Symposiachrus verticalis	Bismarck Archipelago of Papua New Guinea.
	Solomons monarch	Symposiachrus barbatus	southeast Solomon Islands archipelago
	Malaita monarch	Symposiachrus malaitae	Malaita in the Solomon Islands archipelago
	White-collared monarch	Symposiachrus vidua	Solomon Islands
	Vella Lavella monarch	Symposiachrus nigrotectus	northwest and north New Georgia Islands
	Kolombangara monarch	Symposiachrus browni	Solomon Islands
	Rufous monarch	Symposiachrus rufiensis	New Guinea
