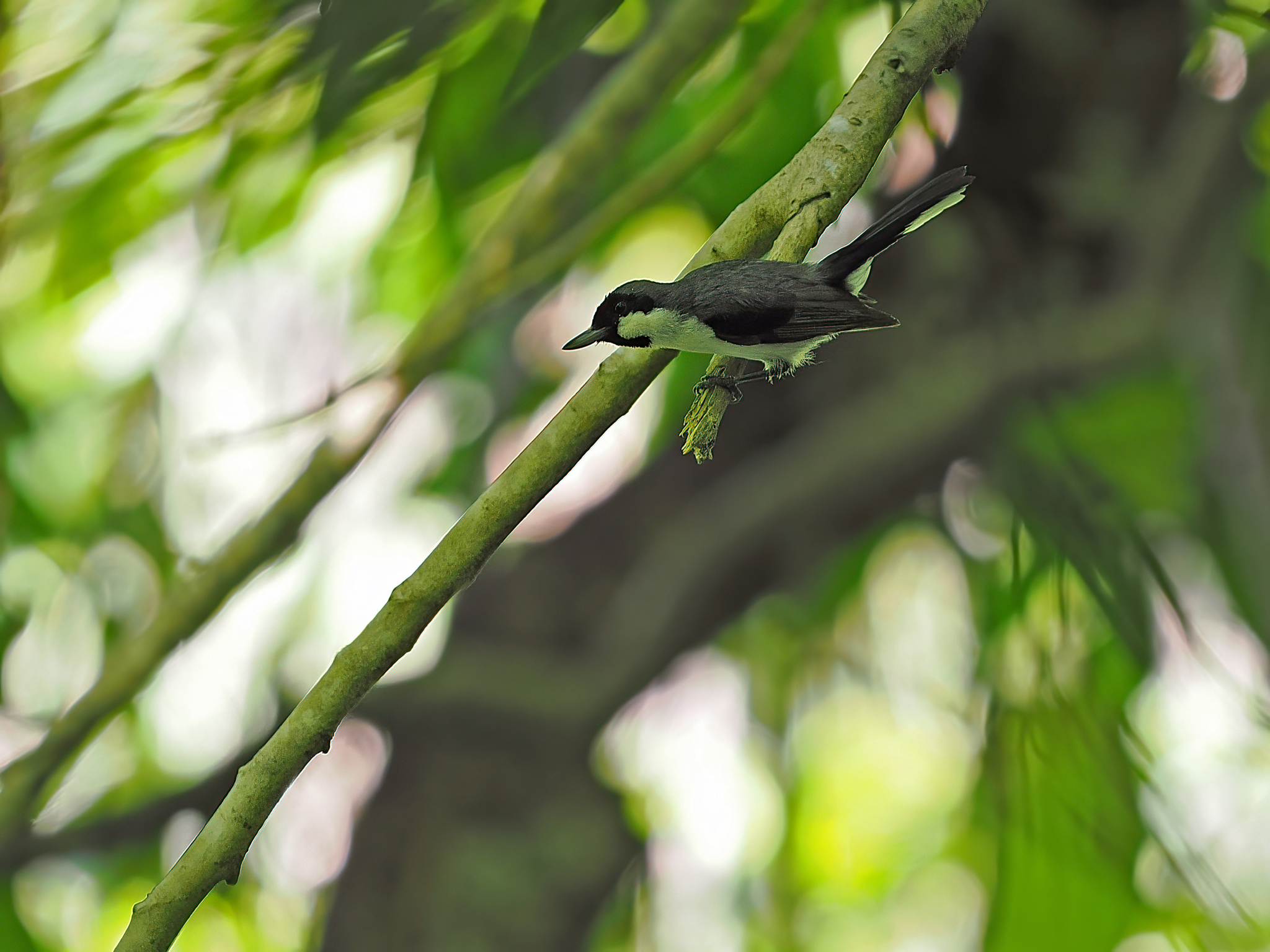

Conservation status
- Least Concern (IUCN 3.1)

Scientific classification
- Kingdom: Animalia
- Phylum: Chordata
- Class: Aves
- Order: Passeriformes
- Family: Monarchidae
- Genus: Symposiachrus
- Species: S. mundus

Binomial name
- Symposiachrus mundus (P.L. Sclater, 1883)

Synonyms
- Monarcha mundus; Symposiarchus mundus

= Banda Sea monarch =

Species of bird

The Banda Sea monarch (Symposiachrus mundus), formerly known as the black-bibbed monarch, is a species of bird in the family Monarchidae that is endemic to Indonesia. It is found in the Tanimbar Islands. Its natural habitats are subtropical or tropical moist lowland forests and subtropical or tropical mangrove forests.

== Taxonomy and systematics ==
This species was formerly placed in the genus Monarcha until moved to Symposiachrus in 2009.
