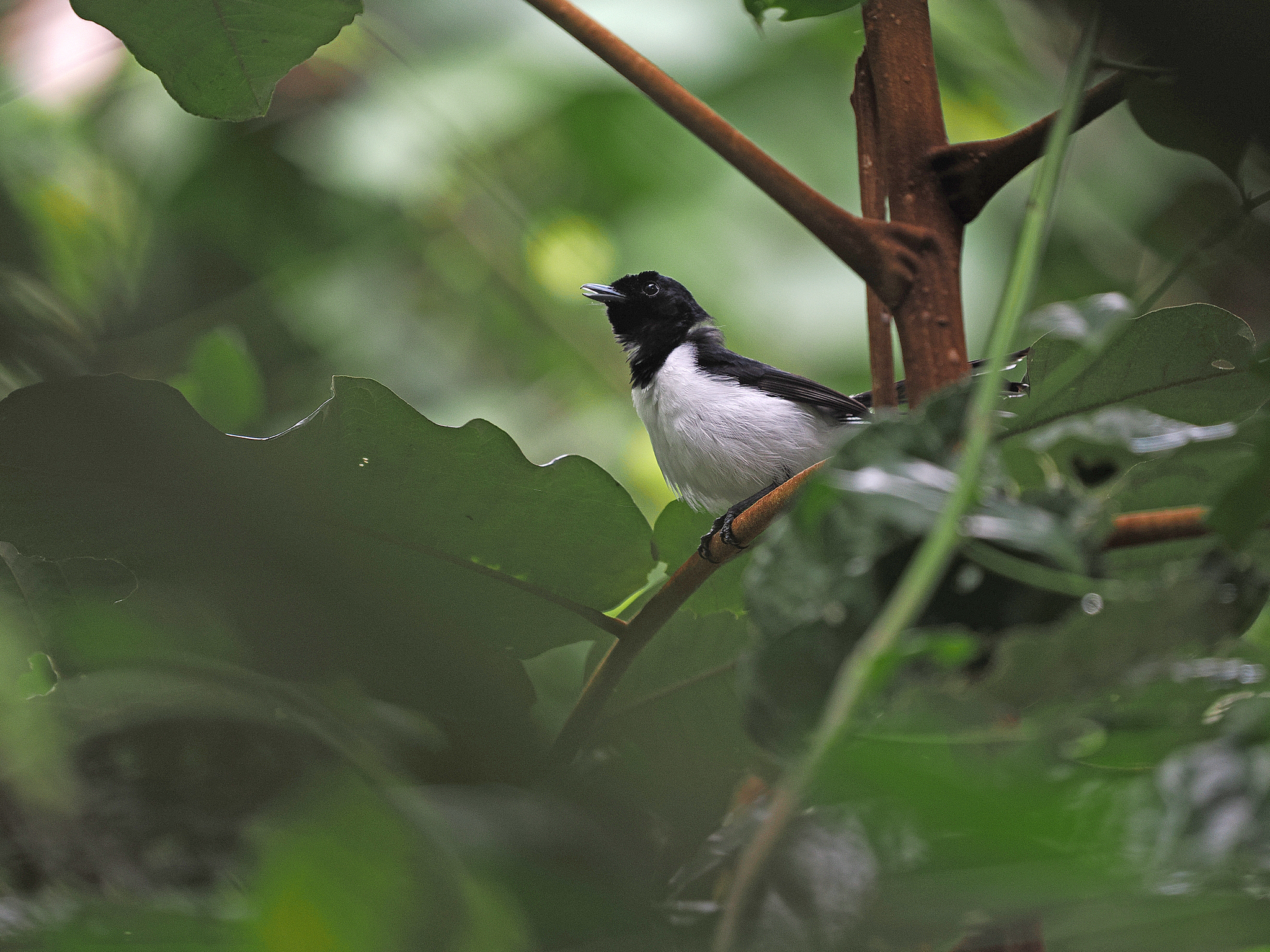

Conservation status
- Endangered (IUCN 3.1)

Scientific classification
- Kingdom: Animalia
- Phylum: Chordata
- Class: Aves
- Order: Passeriformes
- Family: Monarchidae
- Genus: Symposiachrus
- Species: S. everetti

Binomial name
- Symposiachrus everetti (Hartert, 1896)

Synonyms
- Monarcha everetti; Monarcha leucurus everetti; Symposiarchus everetti

= Tanahjampea monarch =

Species of bird

The Tanahjampea monarch or white-tipped monarch (Symposiachrus everetti) is a species of bird in the family Monarchidae. The scientific name commemorates British colonial administrator and zoological collector Alfred Hart Everett.

== Taxonomy and systematics ==
This species was originally described in the genus Monarcha until moved to Symposiachrus in 2009. Alternate names include Djampea monarch and Everett's monarch. Some authorities have considered the Tanahjampea monarch to be a subspecies of the Kai monarch.

== Distribution and habitat ==
It is endemic to Indonesia's Tanah Jampea, the second largest of the Selayar Islands group in the Flores Sea. Its natural habitats are subtropical or tropical moist lowland forest, subtropical or tropical mangrove forest and subtropical or tropical moist shrubland. It is threatened by habitat loss.
