= Bruno Mencke =

Bruno Mencke (1876–2 April 1901) was a wealthy German explorer and collector. Born in Braunschweig to Eberhard (a wealthy chocolate manufacturer) and Charlotte (née Wittekop), he was famous for undertaking the First German South Sea Expedition at the age of 24. He fitted out his 300-ton steam yacht Eberhard—purchased from the Prince of Monaco—and sailed to German New Guinea (the Bismarck Archipelago), accompanied by naturalists and anthropologists, including Oskar Heinroth, Paul Kothe, and Georg Duncker. After reaching Herbertshōhe, he brought on board a former German colonial official, Ludwig Caro, as a secretary.

On 31 March 1901, his yacht was anchored in a bay and the crew had camped in tents on an island. The camp was attacked by locals with spears. Mencke's men used firearms to repel the attack, but Caro was speared through and killed along with a few other crew while many members were injured. It was claimed in the newspapers that the bodies were later found to be eaten by the local cannibals. Mencke himself died from injuries on 2 April and was buried in St. Matthias. The ornithologist Oskar Heinroth was injured but survived and wrote several papers on the findings from the expedition. A bird species, the Mussau monarch, Symposiachrus menckei, was named after Mencke.

A punitive expedition was launched in 1901 by the German colonial forces under (later Admiral) Max von Grapow, which killed about 80 native islanders, including women and children. In 1903, the tomb of Mencke was visited by governor Albert Hahl and found to have been dug up and damaged with only a maxilla with molars remaining that was identified as belonging to Mencke based on the gold fillings.
