= Mussau monarch =

Conservation status
- Near Threatened (IUCN 3.1)

Scientific classification
- Kingdom: Animalia
- Phylum: Chordata
- Class: Aves
- Order: Passeriformes
- Family: Monarchidae
- Genus: Symposiachrus
- Species: S. menckei

Binomial name
- Symposiachrus menckei (Heinroth, 1902)

Synonyms
- Monarcha menckei; Symposiarchus menckei

Species of bird

The Mussau monarch (Symposiachrus menckei), also known as the white-breasted monarch, is a species of bird in the family Monarchidae. It is endemic to the Bismarck Archipelago of Papua New Guinea. Its natural habitats are subtropical or tropical moist lowland forests and rural gardens. It is threatened by habitat loss.

== Taxonomy and systematics ==
The Mussau monarch was originally placed in the genus Monarcha until moved to Symposiachrus in 2009. Alternate names include Mencke's monarch, Mussau Island monarch, Mussau pied monarch and St. Matthias monarch. The species name is after Bruno Mencke who supported the expedition on which the species was collected by Oskar Heinroth.
