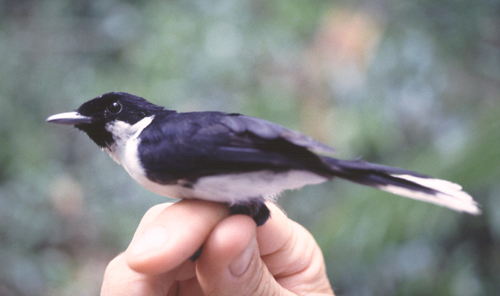
- On the island of Boano, 1994 (Kees Moeliker)

Conservation status
- Critically Endangered (IUCN 3.1)

Scientific classification
- Kingdom: Animalia
- Phylum: Chordata
- Class: Aves
- Order: Passeriformes
- Family: Monarchidae
- Genus: Symposiachrus
- Species: S. boanensis

Binomial name
- Symposiachrus boanensis (van Bemmel, 1939)

Synonyms
- Monarcha boanensis; Monarcha trivirgata boanensis; Monarcha trivirgatus boanensis; Symposiachrus trivirgatus boanensis; Symposiarchus boanensis

= Boano monarch =

Species of bird

The Boano monarch (Symposiachrus boanensis), or black-chinned monarch, is a species of bird in the family Monarchidae endemic to Indonesia. It is found on Boano island in the southern Mollucas. Its natural habitats are subtropical or tropical moist lowland forest and subtropical or tropical moist shrubland. It is threatened by habitat loss.

== Taxonomy and systematics ==
This species was originally described as a subspecies of the spectacled monarch and then classified as a separate species in the genus Monarcha until moved to Symposiachrus in 2009. The name 'black-chinned monarch' is also used as an alternate name for the black-winged monarch.
