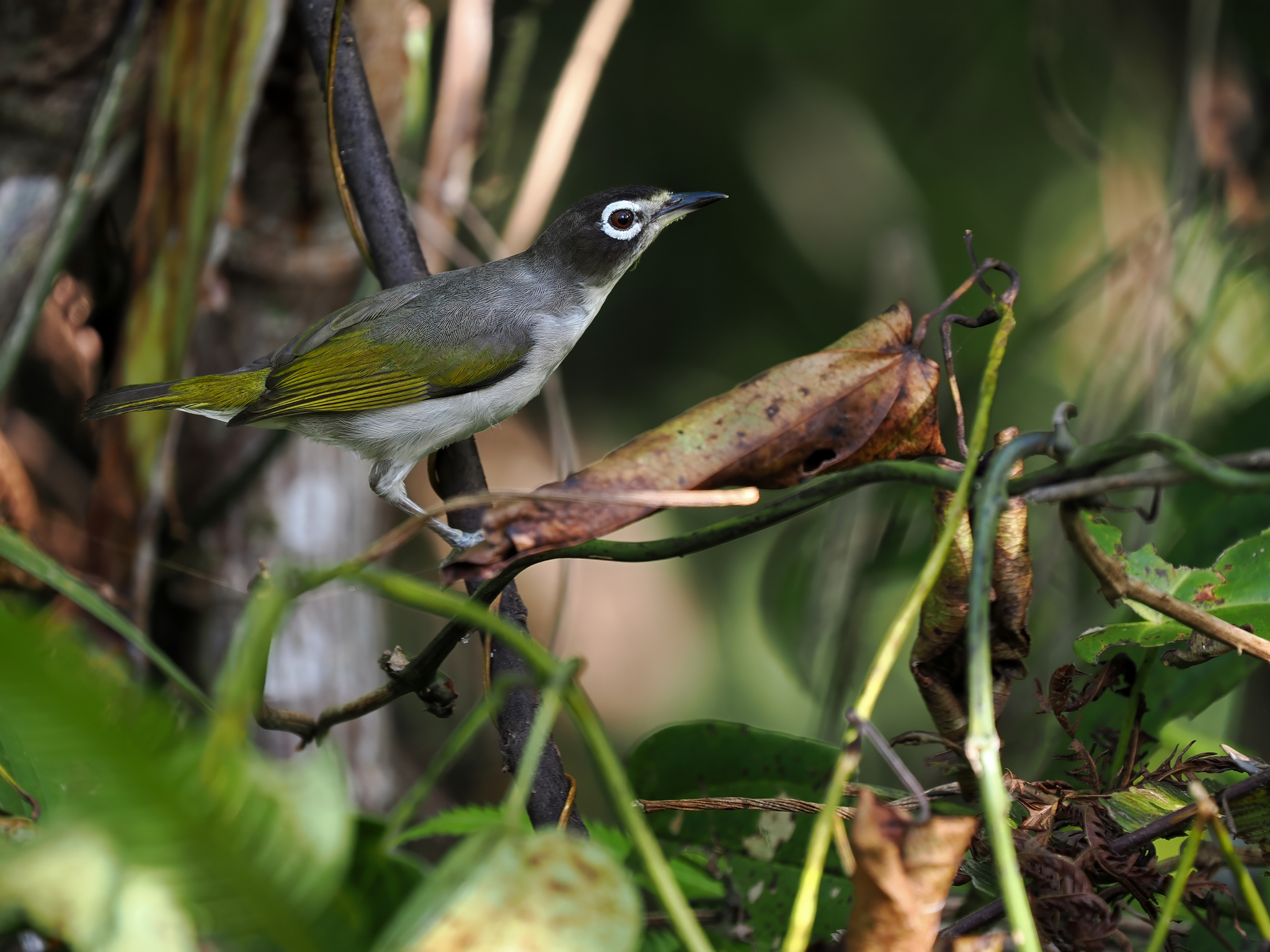

Scientific classification
- Kingdom: Animalia
- Phylum: Chordata
- Class: Aves
- Order: Passeriformes
- Family: Zosteropidae
- Genus: Zosterops
- Species: Z. dehaani

Binomial name
- Zosterops dehaani van Bemmel, 1939

= Morotai white-eye =

Species of bird

The Morotai white-eye (Zosterops dehaani) is a species of bird in the family Zosteropidae. It is endemic to Morotai in the northern Moluccas. It was separated from the cream-throated white-eye based on distinct plumage, exceptional dawn song, and submontane/montane ecology
