= Mencke's monarch =

Mencke's monarch may refer to:

- Flores monarch, a species of bird endemic to Flores
- Mussau monarch, a species of bird endemic to the Bismarck Archipelago
