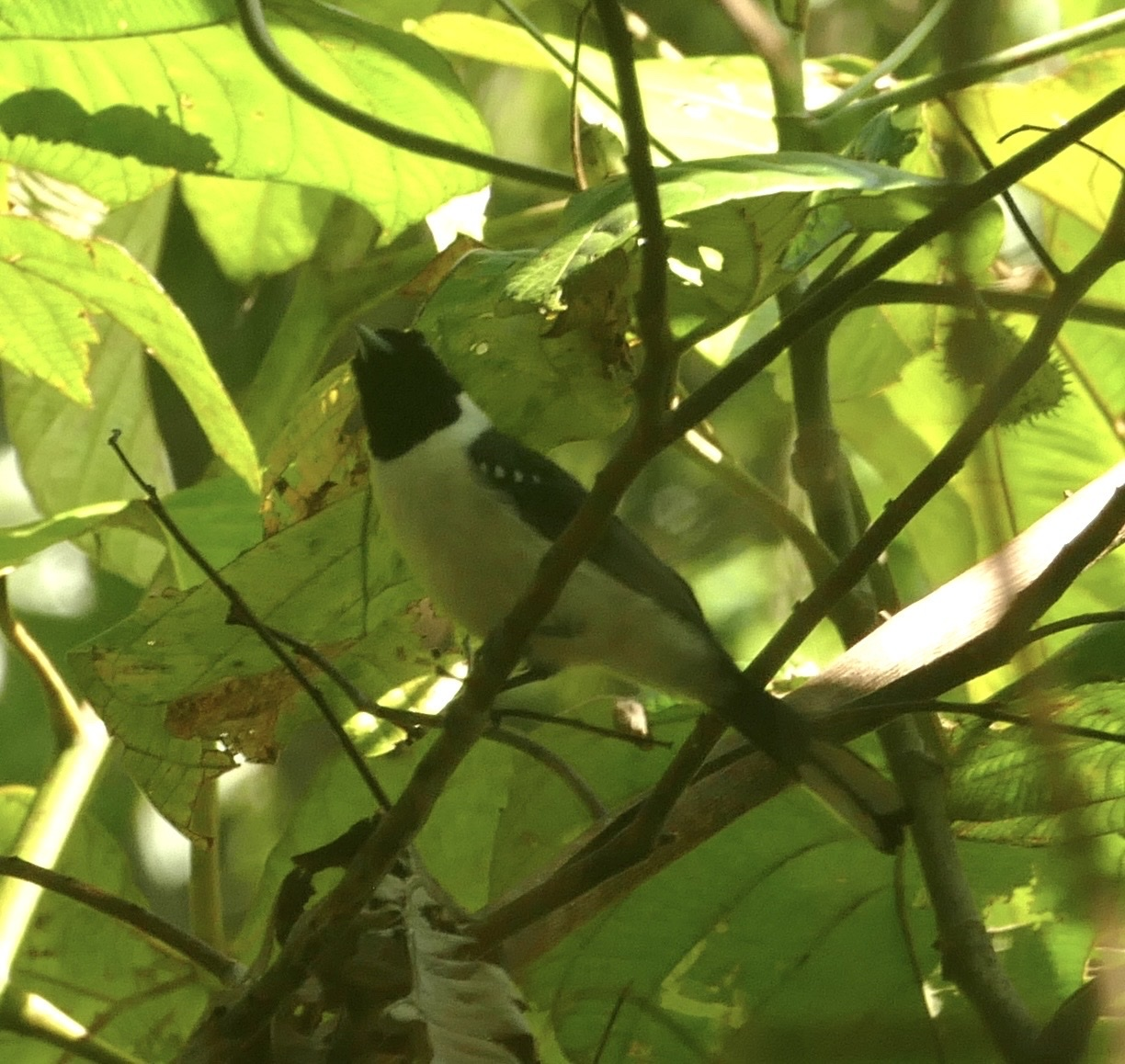

Conservation status
- Least Concern (IUCN 3.1)

Scientific classification
- Kingdom: Animalia
- Phylum: Chordata
- Class: Aves
- Order: Passeriformes
- Family: Monarchidae
- Genus: Symposiachrus
- Species: S. guttula

Binomial name
- Symposiachrus guttula (Lesson & Garnot, 1828)

Synonyms
- Monarcha guttulus; Monarcha guttula; Muscicapa guttula; Symposiarchus guttula

= Spot-winged monarch =

Species of bird

The spot-winged monarch (Symposiachrus guttula), or spot-wing monarch flycatcher, is a species of bird in the family Monarchidae. It is found in New Guinea. Its natural habitat is subtropical or tropical moist lowland forests.

== Taxonomy and systematics ==
The spot-winged monarch was originally placed in the genus Muscicapa and later Monarcha until moved to Symposiachrus in 2009.
