= Kolombangara monarch =

Conservation status
- Near Threatened (IUCN 3.1)

Scientific classification
- Kingdom: Animalia
- Phylum: Chordata
- Class: Aves
- Order: Passeriformes
- Family: Monarchidae
- Genus: Symposiachrus
- Species: S. browni

Binomial name
- Symposiachrus browni (Ramsay, 1883)

Subspecies
- See text

Synonyms
- Monarcha browni; Monarcha kulambangrae; Symposiarchus browni

Species of bird

The Kolombangara monarch (Symposiachrus browni), or Brown's monarch, is a species of bird in the family Monarchidae. It is endemic to Solomon Islands. Its natural habitat is subtropical or tropical moist lowland forests. It is threatened by habitat loss. It was formerly considered as conspecific with the Vella Lavella monarch.

== Taxonomy and systematics ==
This species was originally placed in the genus Monarcha until moved to Symposiachrus in 2009.

Two subspecies are recognised:

- S. b. browni (Ramsay, EP, 1883) – Kolombangara, New Georgia, Vangunu and satellites (east, south New Georgia group, central west Solomon Islands)
- S. b. meeki (Rothschild & Hartert, EJO, 1905) – Rendova and Tetepare Islands (southwest New Georgia group, central west Solomon Islands)

The meeki subspecies differs from the browni subspecies in that there is less white in the tail feathers.

The Vella Lavella monarch was formerly considered as a subspecies.
