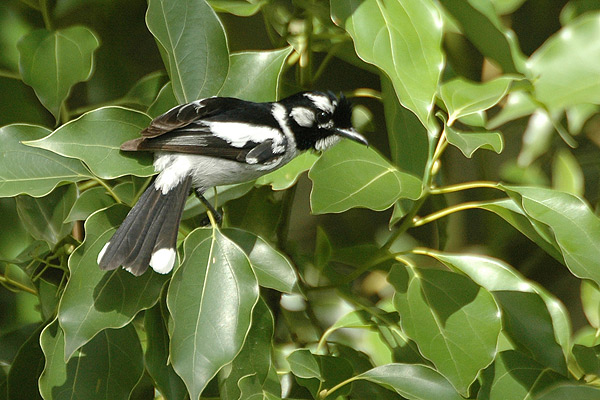
- White-eared monarch (Carterornis leucotis)

Scientific classification
- Kingdom: Animalia
- Phylum: Chordata
- Class: Aves
- Order: Passeriformes
- Family: Monarchidae
- Genus: Carterornis; Mathews, 1912

Type species
- Monarcha leucotis Gould, 1850

= Carterornis =

Genus of birds

Carterornis is a genus of birds in the family Monarchidae that are found in Australia and Melanesia.

== Taxonomy ==
When the genus Monarcha was split based on the results of a molecular phylogenetic study published in 2005, 3 species were moved to the resurrected genus Carterornis. The genus had originally been introduced by the Australian born ornithologist Gregory Mathews in 1912 with the white-eared monarch (Carterornis leucotis) as the type species. The genus name honors English ornithologist Thomas Carter (1863–1931).

=== Species ===
The genus contains the following species:

Image	Common name	Scientific name	Distribution
	White-eared monarch	Carterornis leucotis	north-eastern Australia.
	White-naped monarch	Carterornis pileatus	Maluku Islands.
	Tanimbar monarch	Carterornis castus	Tanimbar Islands.
	Golden monarch	Carterornis chrysomela	New Guinea.
