= Black-and-white monarch =

Black-and-white monarch may refer to:

- Hooded monarch, a species of bird found in New Guinea
- Solomons monarch, a species of bird endemic to the Solomon Islands
