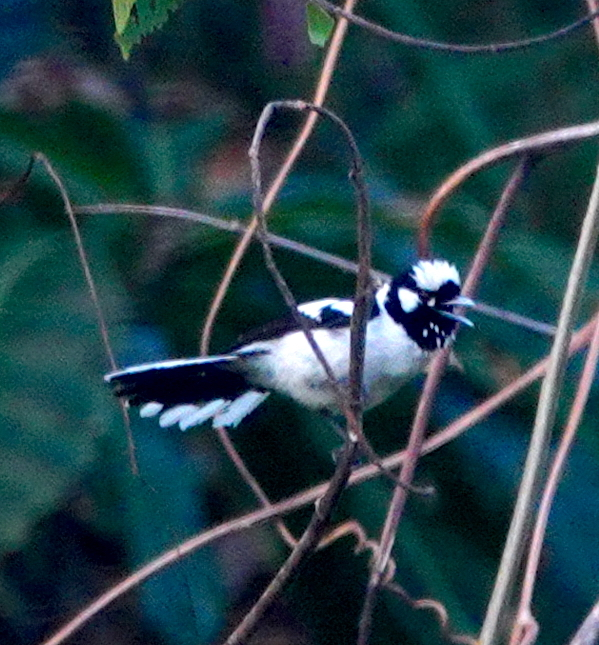

Conservation status
- Least Concern (IUCN 3.1)

Scientific classification
- Kingdom: Animalia
- Phylum: Chordata
- Class: Aves
- Order: Passeriformes
- Family: Monarchidae
- Genus: Carterornis
- Species: C. castus

Binomial name
- Carterornis castus (Sclater, PL, 1883)

Synonyms
- Monarcha castus; Carterornis pileatus castus

= Tanimbar monarch =

Subspecies of bird

The Tanimbar monarch (Carterornis castus), or Loetoe monarch is a bird in the family Monarchidae endemic to Indonesia. It is found in the Tanimbar Islands.

== Taxonomy and systematics ==
This subspecies was formerly placed in the genus Monarcha until moved to Carterornis in 2009. While the Tanimbar monarch was formerly considered a subspecies of the white-naped monarch (C. pileatus), it is now considered a separate species.
