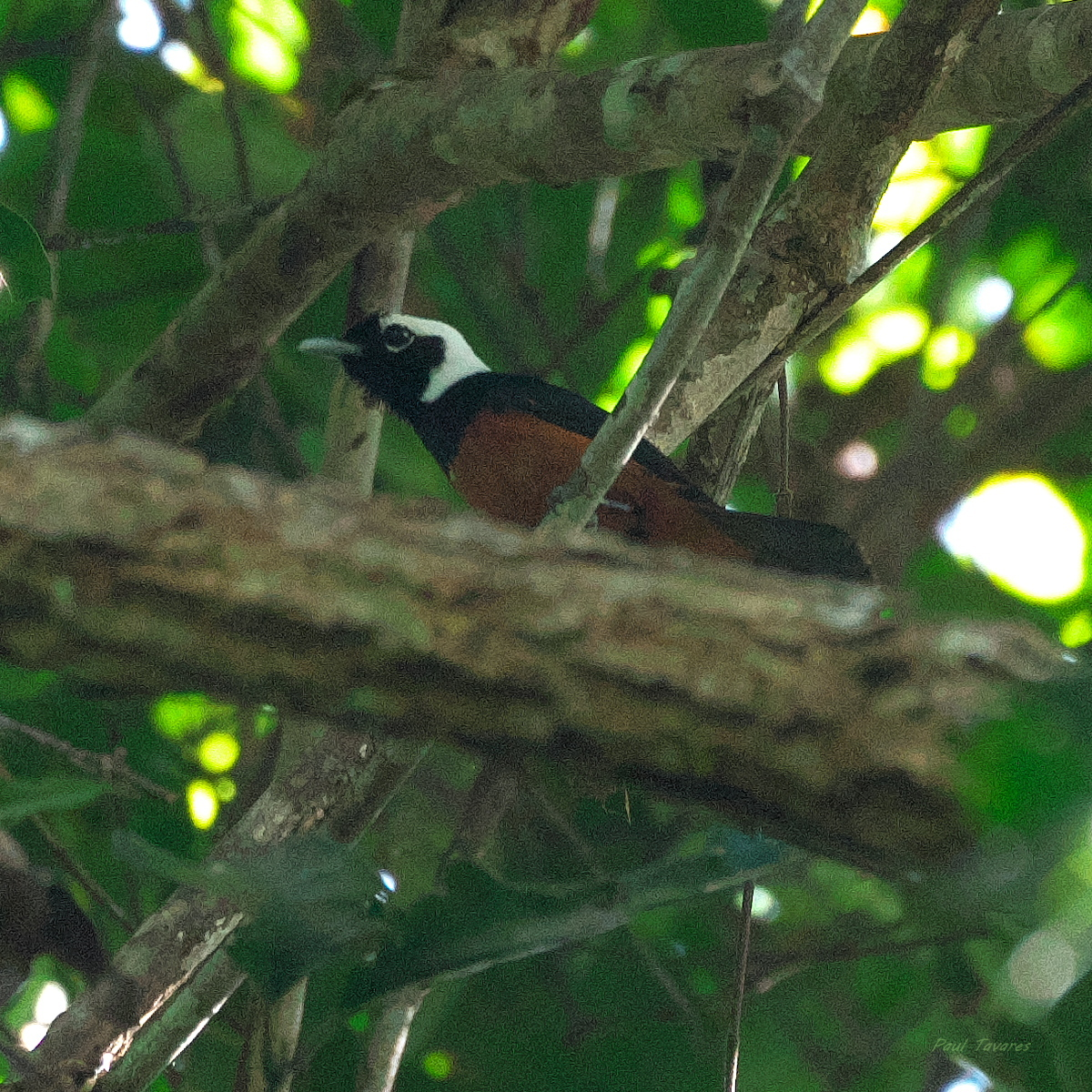

Conservation status
- Least Concern (IUCN 3.1)

Scientific classification
- Kingdom: Animalia
- Phylum: Chordata
- Class: Aves
- Order: Passeriformes
- Family: Monarchidae
- Genus: Monarcha
- Species: M. richardsii

Binomial name
- Monarcha richardsii (E.P. Ramsay, 1881)

Synonyms
- Piezorhynchus Richardsii

= White-capped monarch =

Species of bird

The White-capped monarch (Monarcha richardsii), or Richards' monarch, is a species of bird in the family Monarchidae. It is endemic to the Western Province in the Solomon Islands.

== Description ==
The white-capped monarch is a medium sized bird with a glossy black back, and darker black around the throat and face and a tawny belly. Its most prominent feature is its white cap on the back of its head from its nape to above its forehead, forming an eye-ring around its eye and ending in a half-collar. Juveniles look similar, but have less white on the face.

== Taxonomy ==
This species was originally described as Piezorhynchus richardsii by Edward Pierson Ramsay from a specimen collected on Rendova Island. He named it in honour of Lieutenant R. N. Richards, a personal friend.

== Distribution & population ==
The white-capped monarch is found in the Western Province of the Solomon Islands on the islands of New Georgia, Rendova, Kolombangara, Vella Lavella, Ranongga, Tetepare, Gizo, Vangunu, and Arundel Island as well as some of the smaller islands. The IUCN says that the population is declining, but its larger range, relative to other island birds, and it being reported as common, by locals, warranted it being ranked as Least Concern. Major threats facing the White-capped Monarch include deforestation that is rapidly expanding in all of the major islands within its range.

== Behaviour ==
Like all Monarchs, males are territorial. Studies using specimen mounts provided evidence that the strong plumage, particularly the white cap of males may serve as a social signal.
