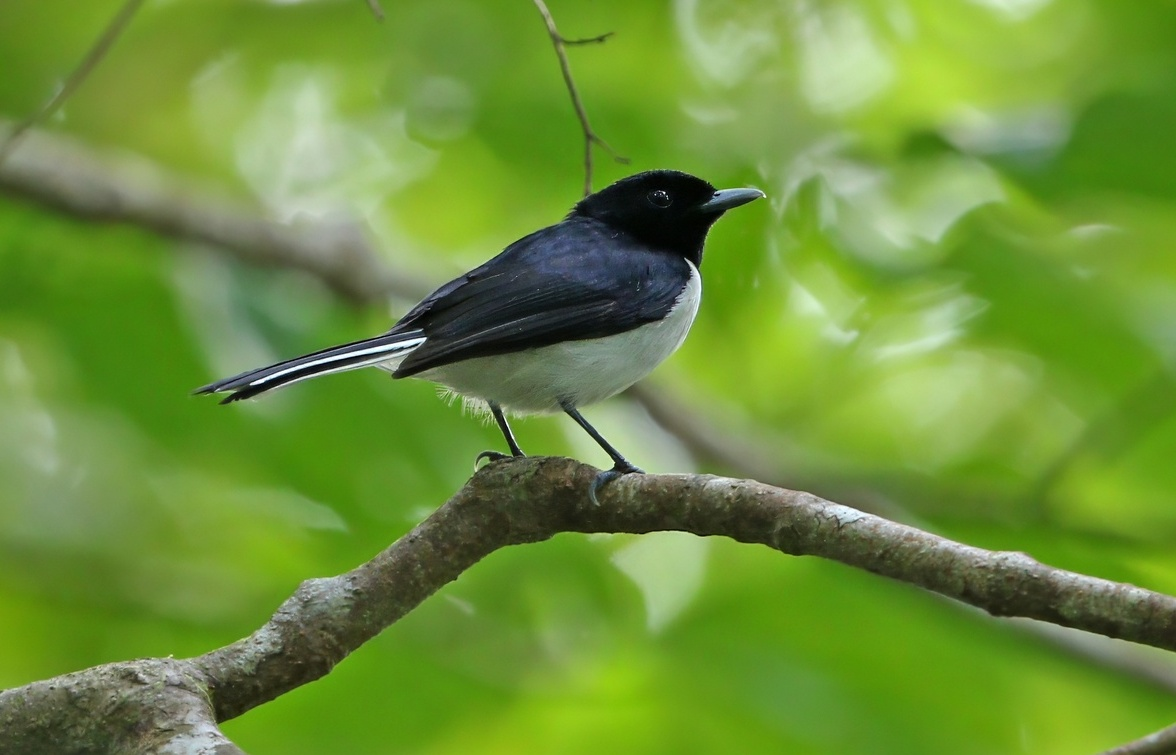

Conservation status
- Near Threatened (IUCN 3.1)

Scientific classification
- Kingdom: Animalia
- Phylum: Chordata
- Class: Aves
- Order: Passeriformes
- Family: Monarchidae
- Genus: Symposiachrus
- Species: S. leucurus

Binomial name
- Symposiachrus leucurus (G.R. Gray, 1858)

Synonyms
- Monarcha leucurus; Symposiarchus leucurus

= Kai monarch =

Species of bird

The Kai monarch (Symposiachrus leucurus), or white-tailed monarch, is a species of bird in the family Monarchidae. It is endemic to the Kai Islands. Its natural habitat is subtropical or tropical moist lowland forests. It is threatened by habitat loss.

== Taxonomy and systematics ==
This species was originally described in the genus Monarcha until moved to Symposiachrus in 2009. Some authorities have considered both the Tanahjampea monarch and the Buru monarch to be subspecies of the white-tailed monarch.
