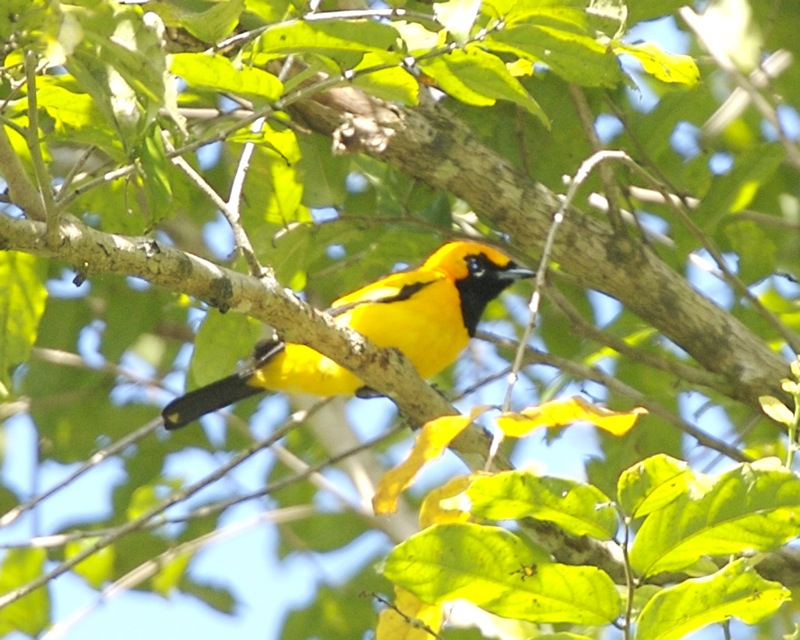
- Male photographed on Biak, Indonesia

Conservation status
- Least Concern (IUCN 3.1)

Scientific classification
- Kingdom: Animalia
- Phylum: Chordata
- Class: Aves
- Order: Passeriformes
- Family: Monarchidae
- Genus: Carterornis
- Species: C. chrysomela

Binomial name
- Carterornis chrysomela (Lesson & Garnot, 1827)

Subspecies
- See text

Synonyms
- Monarcha chrysomela; Muscicapa chrysomela

= Golden monarch =

Species of bird

The golden monarch (Carterornis chrysomela) is a species of passerine bird in the family Monarchidae found in New Guinea. Its natural habitats are subtropical or tropical moist lowland forests and subtropical or tropical moist montane forest. The golden monarch displays marked sexual dimorphism, the male a striking golden colour with black mask, wings and tail, the female a golden or golden-olive colour. Both bear a characteristic 'teardrop' white pattern below the eye.

== Taxonomy and systematics ==
The golden monarch was first described by French naturalist Prosper Garnot in 1827. It was originally described in the genus Muscicapa and then placed in the genus Monarcha until moved to Carterornis in 2009.

The golden monarch is a member of a group of birds termed monarch flycatchers. This group is considered either as a subfamily Monarchinae, together with the fantails as part of the drongo family Dicruridae, or as a family Monarchidae in its own right. They are not closely related to their namesakes, the Old World flycatchers of the family Muscicapidae as early molecular research in the late 1980s and early 1990s revealed that the monarchs belong to a large group of mainly Australasian birds known as the Corvida parvorder comprising many tropical and Australian passerines. More recently, the grouping has been refined somewhat as the monarchs have been classified in a 'Core corvine' group with the crows and ravens, shrikes, birds of paradise, fantails, drongos and mudnest builders.

Alternate names for the golden monarch include the black-and-gold monarch, black-and-yellow monarch and black-and-yellow monarch flycatcher.

=== Subspecies ===
There are nine subspecies recognized:

- C. c. aruensis - (Salvadori, 1874): Originally described as a separate species in the genus Monarcha. Found in south-western New Guinea and Aru Islands (off south-western New Guinea)
- C. c. melanonotus - (Sclater, PL, 1877): Originally described as a separate species in the genus Monarcha. Found on western Papuan islands and north-western New Guinea
- C. c. kordensis - (Meyer, AB, 1874): Originally described as a separate species in the genus Monarcha. Found on Biak (off north-western New Guinea)
- C. c. aurantiacus - (Meyer, AB, 1891): Found in northern New Guinea
- C. c. nitidus - (De Vis, 1897): Originally described as a separate species in the genus Poecilodryas. Found in eastern and south-eastern New Guinea, Louisiade Archipelago
- C. c. pulcherrimus - (Salomonsen, 1964): Found on Dyaul Island (Bismarck Archipelago)
- C. c. chrysomela - (Lesson & Garnot, 1827): Found on New Hanover Island and New Ireland (Bismarck Archipelago)
- C. c. whitneyorum - (Mayr, 1955): Found on Lihir Island (Bismarck Archipelago)
- C. c. tabarensis - (Mayr, 1955): Found on Tabar Island (Bismarck Archipelago)

== Description ==
Measuring 12.5 to 14 cm (4.9 to 5.5 in), the golden monarch displays marked sexual dimorphism. The male is a bright golden colour with sharply delineated black cheeks and throat, primary wing feathers and tail. It has a pale blue and black bill and dark brown iris, and a distinctive teardrop pattern of white feathers under the eye. The subspecies pulcherrima has a golden back, others have a black back. The female lacks the black colouring and is instead an olive-greenish with more yellowish underparts. It has black bill and the teardrop pattern under the eye.

== Distribution and habitat ==
The golden monarch is found across New Guinea, and to the Aru Islands to the west, the D'Entrecasteaux Islands and the Bismarck Archipelago to the east, but not New Britain.

The preferred habitat is lowland rainforest or swamp forest to 700 m (2000 ft), or 1400 m (4000 ft) in New Ireland. It stays mainly in the canopy, although may descend for water.

== Feeding ==
The golden monarch is insectivorous. It may be found in mixed-species foraging flocks with the yellow-bellied gerygone (Gerygone chrysogaster) and Wallace's fairywren (Sipodotus wallacii).
