= Mussau Island monarch =

Mussau Island monarch may refer to several species of birds:

- Flores monarch, endemic to Flores
- Mussau monarch, endemic to the Bismarck Archipelago
