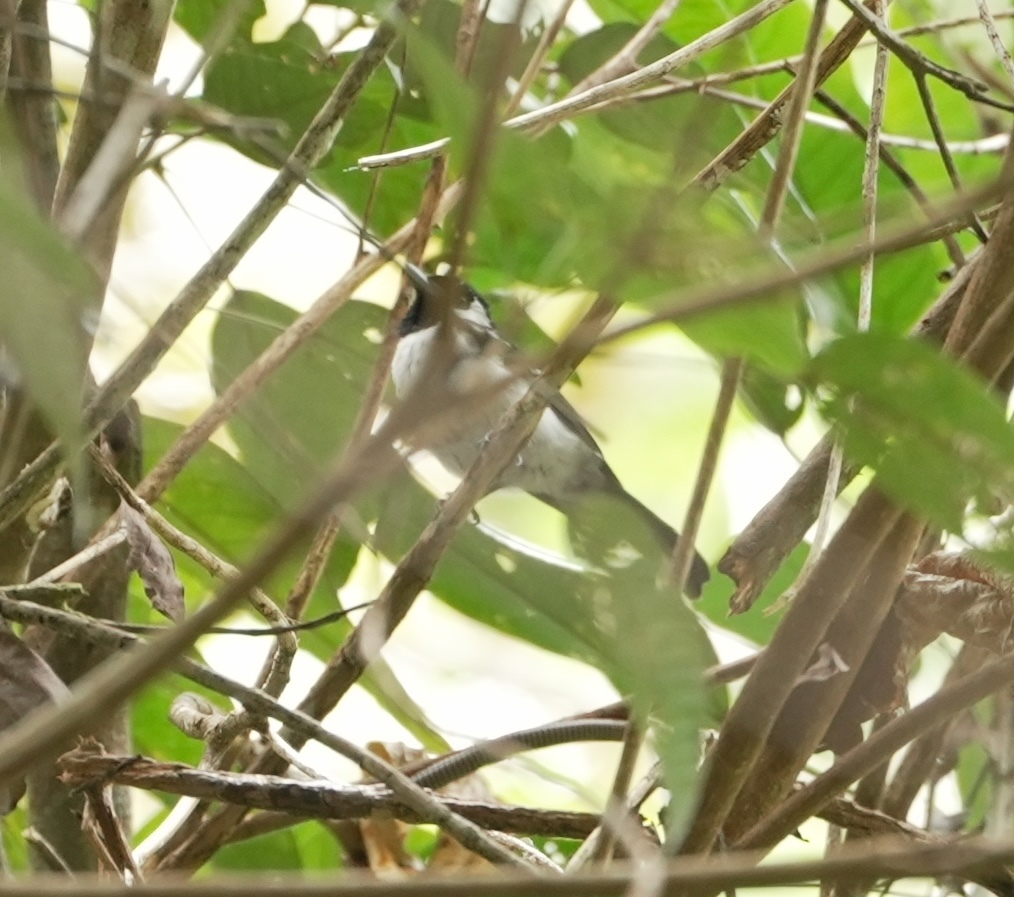

Conservation status
- Least Concern (IUCN 3.1)

Scientific classification
- Kingdom: Animalia
- Phylum: Chordata
- Class: Aves
- Order: Passeriformes
- Family: Monarchidae
- Genus: Symposiachrus
- Species: S. verticalis

Binomial name
- Symposiachrus verticalis (P.L. Sclater, 1877)
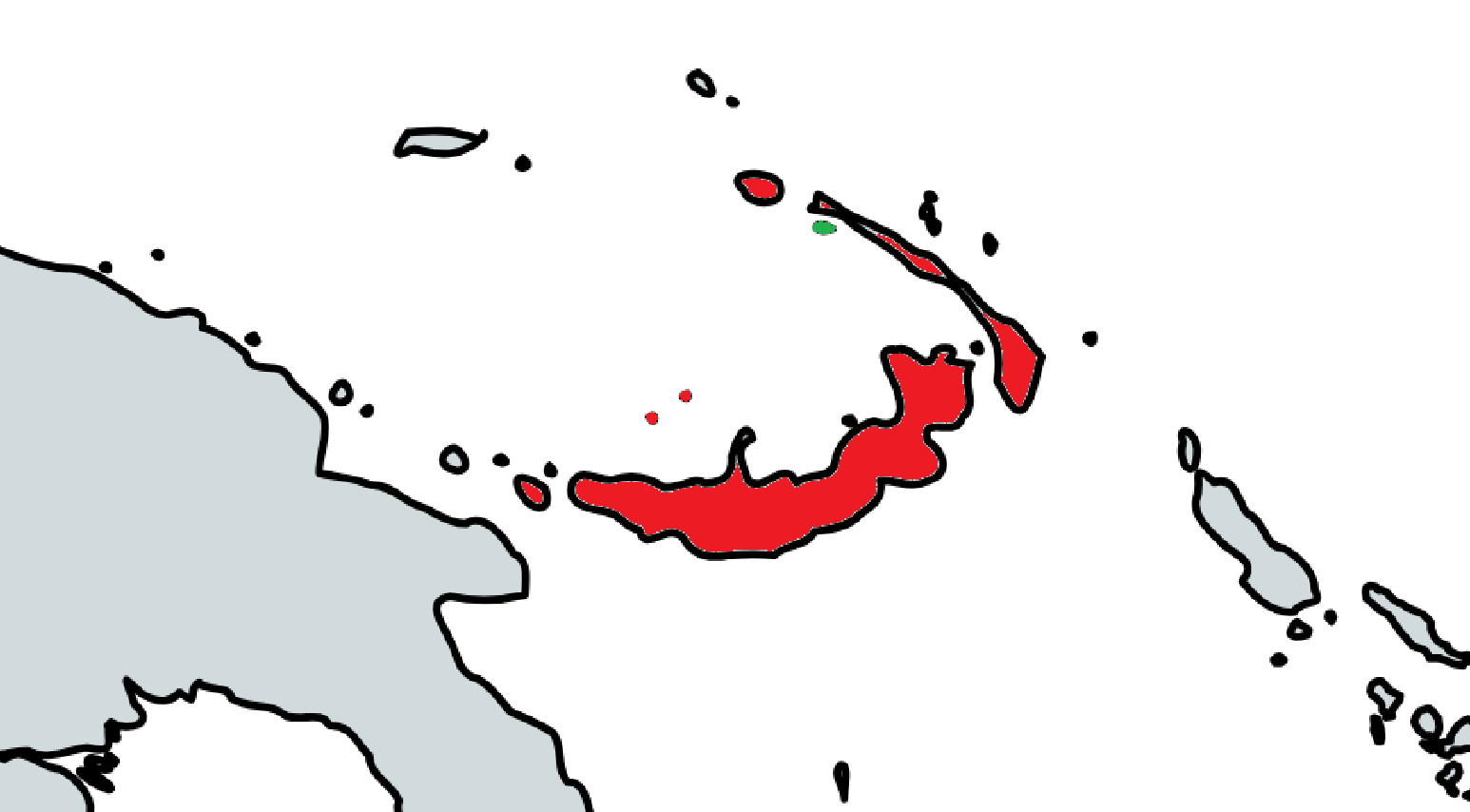
- Symposiachrus verticalis verticalis Symposiachrus verticalis ateralbus

Synonyms
- Monarcha verticalis; Symposiarchus verticalis

= Bismarck monarch =

Species of bird

The Bismarck monarch (Symposiachrus verticalis), formerly known as the black-tailed monarch, is a species of bird in the family Monarchidae. It is endemic to the Bismarck Archipelago of Papua New Guinea. Its natural habitat is subtropical or tropical moist lowland forests.

== Taxonomy and systematics ==
This species was originally placed in the genus Monarcha until moved to Symposiachrus in 2009.

Two subspecies are recognized-

- Black-tailed monarch, Symposiachrus verticalis verticalis Sclater, 1877- Bismarck Archipelago
- Djaul monarch, Symposiachrus verticalis ateralbus Salomonsen, 1964- Djaul Island

The Djaul monarch was earlier considered a full species but is now considered a subspecies based on plumage, vocal and genetic evidence.

== Description ==
This species is a pied bird with a white face and black throat. The male has a black crown with a band of white and a black tail and upperparts. The legs are dark grey or blackish and the bill is grey in colour.

The male and female are similar, except that the female has a grey back and rump. The juvenile has a pale grey forehead and face.

The subspecies ateralbus is larger than the nominate and has extensive white on the outer tail feathers.

== Voice ==
The song is a descending series of thin fine whistles.

== Breeding ==
It usually breeds from August to January. The nest is cup-shaped, made of plant fibers and lichens and joined together with spider webs placed at a height of 1.5 meters. The clutch is usually 2 eggs, which are pale pinkish with black spots and are approximately 24 x 17 millimeters.

== Habitats and habits ==
It is usually found in semi-evergreen forests and bamboo thickets at an elevation of 1300 meters.

It is usually solitary and sometimes occurs in mixed-species flocks in pursuit of its insect prey.
