= Max von Grapow =

Max von Grapow (18 April 1861 — 4 March 1924) was a German navy Admiral and colonial officer who served in the German colonies in Melanesia, most notably New Guinea.

Grapow served as a Captain on the cruiser Cormoran in the Bismarck Islands in 1903, during which time he was involved in a punitive expedition following the killing of the explorer Bruno Mencke. In 1900 Grapow, then head of section A4, was in charge of naval operations against Britain and Denmark. Around 1899 the German government desired to hand over the Mariana Islands to Japan and Grapow agreed with this view but was strongly in favour of Germany continuing to hold power in the South Sea Islands including Samoa. After his retirement, Grapow headed the Pan-German League from 1917.
