= Malaita monarch =

Conservation status
- Near Threatened (IUCN 3.1)

Scientific classification
- Kingdom: Animalia
- Phylum: Chordata
- Class: Aves
- Order: Passeriformes
- Family: Monarchidae
- Genus: Symposiachrus
- Species: S. malaitae

Binomial name
- Symposiachrus malaitae (Mayr, 1931)

Species of bird

The Malaita monarch (Symposiachrus malaitae) is a species of passerine bird in the monarch flycatcher family Monarchidae. It is endemic to the island of Malaita in the Solomon Islands archipelago. It was formerly treated as conspecific with the Solomons monarch (Symposiachrus barbatus).

== Taxonomy ==
The Malaita monarch was formally described in 1931 by the American ornithologist Ernst Mayr based on specimens collected on the island of Malaita in the Solomon Islands archipelago. He considered the specimens to be from a subspecies of the Solomons Monarch and coined the trinomial name Monarcha barbata malaitae. The Malaita monarch is now placed in the genus Symposiachrus and is treated as a separate species from the Solomons monarch based on the differences in plumage and genetics.
