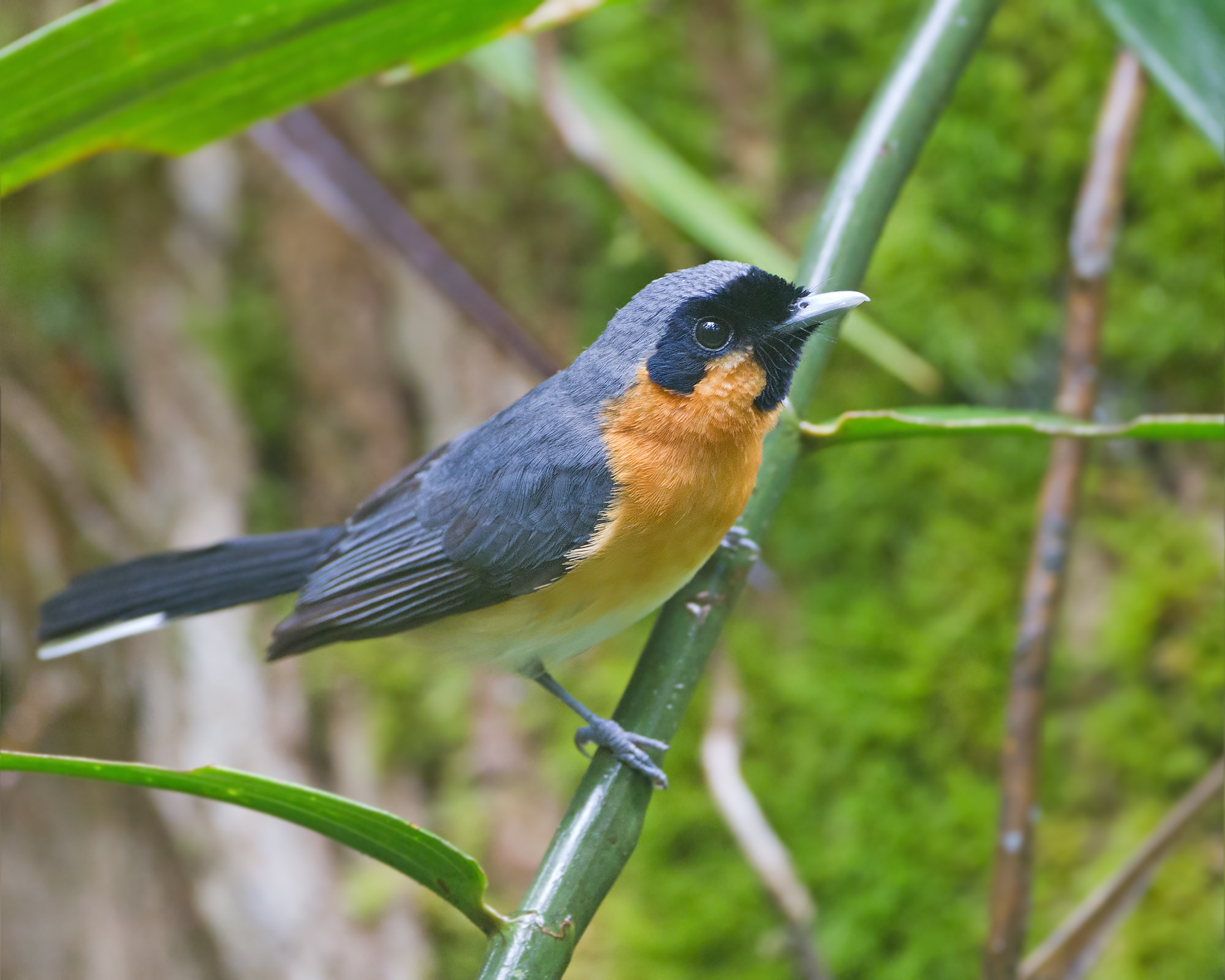

Conservation status
- Least Concern (IUCN 3.1)

Scientific classification
- Kingdom: Animalia
- Phylum: Chordata
- Class: Aves
- Order: Passeriformes
- Family: Monarchidae
- Genus: Symposiachrus
- Species: S. trivirgatus

Binomial name
- Symposiachrus trivirgatus (Temminck, 1826)

Subspecies
- See text

Synonyms
- Drymophila trivirgata; Monarcha trivirgata; Monarcha trivirgatus; Symposiarchus trivirgatus

= Spectacled monarch =

Species of bird

The spectacled monarch (Symposiachrus trivirgatus) is a species of bird in the family Monarchidae. It is found in Australia, Indonesia, and Papua New Guinea. Its natural habitats are subtropical or tropical moist lowland forests, subtropical or tropical mangrove forests, and subtropical or tropical moist montane forests.

== Taxonomy and systematics ==
This species was originally placed in the genus Drymophila and subsequently in Monarcha until moved to Symposiachrus in 2009.

=== Subspecies ===
The Boano monarch was formerly considered as a subspecies and also, some authorities continue to consider the Moluccan monarch as a subspecies of the spectacled monarch. There are currently six subspecies recognized:

- S. t. trivirgatus - (Temminck, 1826): Found in central and eastern Lesser Sunda Islands
- S. t. bernsteinii - (Salvadori, 1878): Originally described as a separate species in the genus Monarcha. Found on Salawati (off western New Guinea)
- S. t. albiventris - (Gould, 1866): Originally described as a separate species in the genus Monarcha. Found in southern New Guinea, islands in the Torres Strait and Cape York Peninsula (north-eastern Australia)
- S. t. melanorrhous - (Schodde & Mason, IJ, 1999): Found in north-eastern Queensland (north-eastern Australia)
- S. t. gouldii - (Gray, GR, 1861): Originally described as a separate species in the genus Monarcha. Found in eastern Australia

== Gallery ==
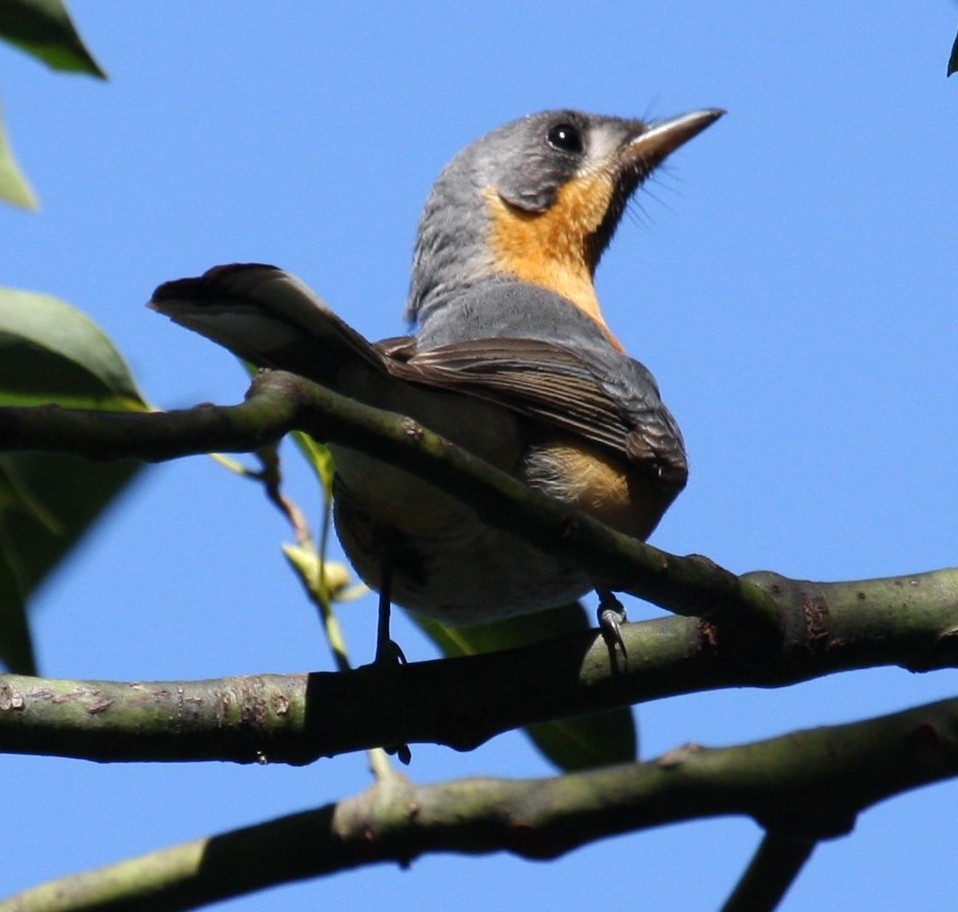
Juvenile Dayboro, SE Queensland
