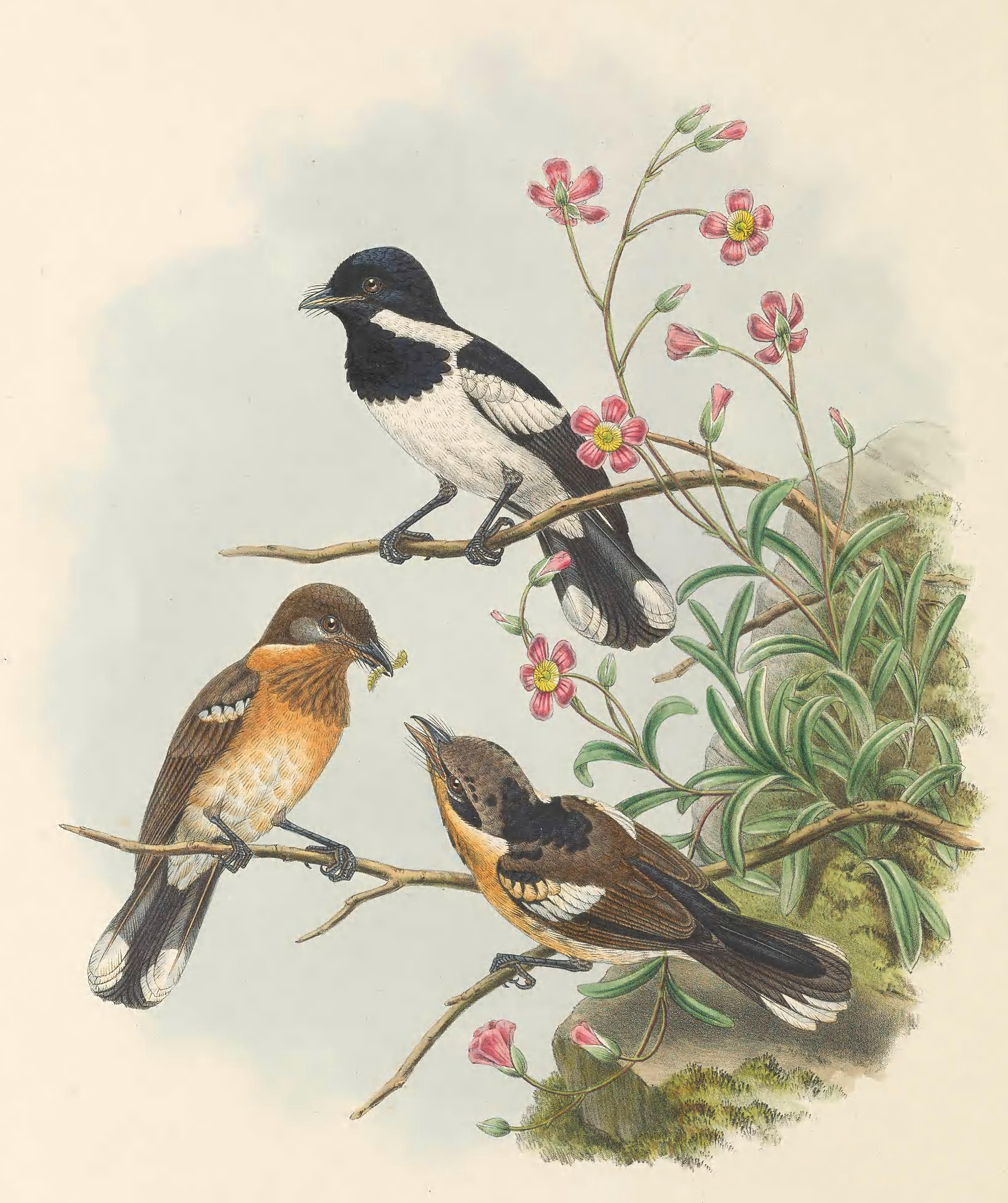
- Illustration by William Matthew Hart

Conservation status
- Least Concern (IUCN 3.1)

Scientific classification
- Kingdom: Animalia
- Phylum: Chordata
- Class: Aves
- Order: Passeriformes
- Family: Monarchidae
- Genus: Symposiachrus
- Species: S. barbatus

Binomial name
- Symposiachrus barbatus (Ramsay, 1879)

Synonyms
- Monarcha barbata; Monarcha barbatus; Monarcha brodiei; Symposiarchus barbatus

= Solomons monarch =

Species of bird

The Solomons monarch (Symposiachrus barbatus), also known as the black-and-white monarch, is a species of passerine bird in the monarch flycatcher family Monarchidae. It is found from Buka Island to Guadalcanal (except the New Georgia Islands) in the Solomon Islands archipelago. Its natural habitat is subtropical or tropical moist lowland forests. It is threatened by habitat loss. This species was formerly considered to be conspecific with the Malaita monarch.

== Taxonomy and systematics ==
The Solomons monarch was originally placed in the genus Monarcha until moved to Symposiachrus in 2009. The Malaita monarch was formerly treated as a subspecies of the Solomons monarch but with the elevation of the Malaita monarch to species status the Solomons monarch is now monotypic. Alternate names for the Solomons monarch include the black-throated monarch, black-white monarch, pied monarch, Solomon Islands pied monarch and Solomons pied monarch. The alternate name 'pied monarch' should not be confused with the species of the same name (Arses kaupi).
