= Velvet flycatcher =

Conservation status
- Least Concern (IUCN 3.1)

Scientific classification
- Kingdom: Animalia
- Phylum: Chordata
- Class: Aves
- Order: Passeriformes
- Family: Monarchidae
- Genus: Myiagra
- Species: M. eichhorni

Binomial name
- Myiagra eichhorni (Hartert, 1924)

Species of bird

The velvet flycatcher (Myiagra eichhorni) is a species of bird in the family Monarchidae. It is endemic to New Hanover, New Ireland & New Britain.

Its natural habitats are subtropical or tropical moist lowland forests and subtropical or tropical moist montane forests.

== Taxonomy ==
The velvet flycatcher was formally described in 1924 by the German ornithologist Ernst Hartert based on a specimen that had been collected on the island of New Hanover in the Bismarck Archipelago by the Australian farmer Albert Frederic Eichhorn (1882-1931). Hartert considered the specimen to represent a subspecies of the Mussau flycatcher which he placed in the genus Monarcha and coined the trinomial name Monarcha hebetior eichhorni. The velvet flycatcher is now one of around 20 species placed in the genus Myiagra that was introduced in 1827 by Nicholas Vigors and Thomas Horsfield.

Two subspecies are recognised:

- M. e. eichhorni (Hartert, EJO, 1924) – New Hanover (=New Hanover Island), New Ireland, New Britain and Watom (north of northeast New Britain) (east Bismarck Archipelago)
- M. e. cervinicolor (Salomonsen, 1964) – Dyaul Island (south of northwest New Ireland, northeast Bismarck Archipelago)

The subspecies M. e. cervinicolor has sometimes been considered as a separate species, the Dyaul flycatcher.
