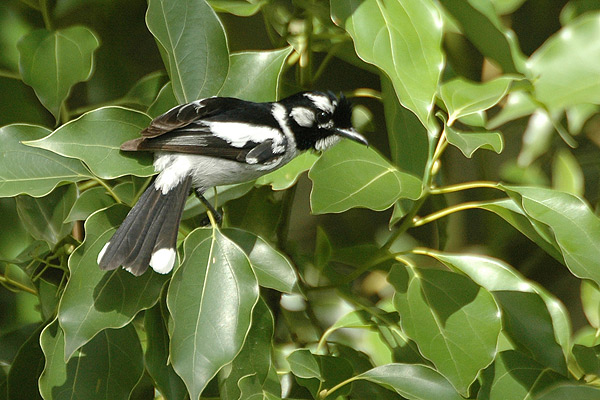

Conservation status
- Least Concern (IUCN 3.1)

Scientific classification
- Kingdom: Animalia
- Phylum: Chordata
- Class: Aves
- Order: Passeriformes
- Family: Monarchidae
- Genus: Carterornis
- Species: C. leucotis

Binomial name
- Carterornis leucotis (Gould, 1850)

Synonyms
- Monarcha leucotis (protonym)

= White-eared monarch =

Species of bird

The white-eared monarch (Carterornis leucotis), or white-eared flycatcher, is a species of bird in the family Monarchidae. It is endemic to north-eastern Australia. Its natural habitat is subtropical or tropical moist lowland forests. The white-eared monarch was originally described in the genus Monarcha until moved to Carterornis in 2009.

== Gallery ==
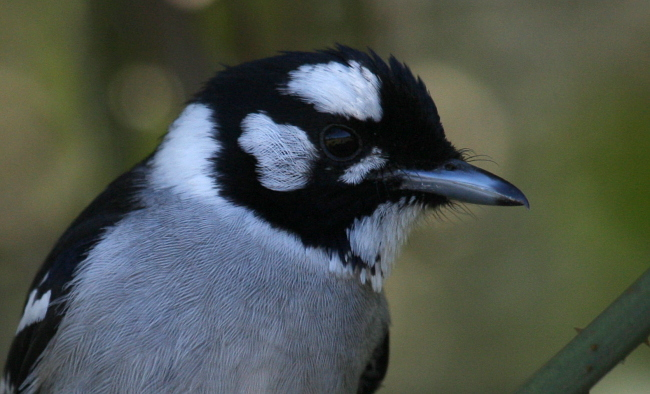
Dayboro, SE Queensland

Rush Creek, SE Queensland, Australia

Dayboro, SE Queensland, Australia
