= Tanah Jampea =

Island in Indonesia

Coordinates: 07°05′S 120°42′E

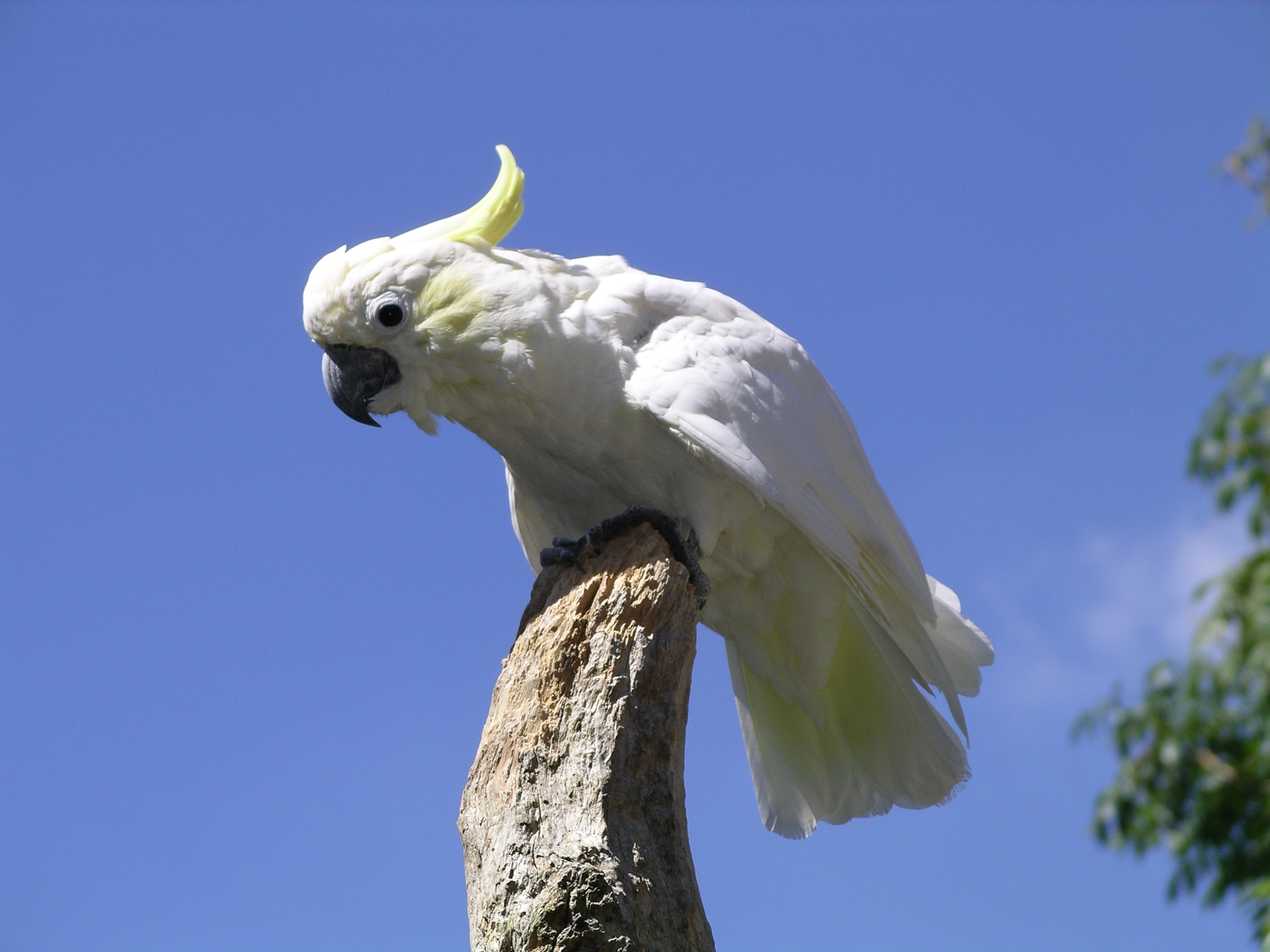
The island supports a population of critically endangered yellow-crested cockatoos

Tanah Jampea, also variously known as Tanah Djampea, Tanahjampea, Jampea Island and Pulau Jampea, is the second largest island of the Selayar Islands group in Indonesia’s South Sulawesi Province. The group lies in the Flores Sea between the much larger islands of Sulawesi to the north and Flores to the south. The island is some 22 km long by up to 10 km wide, with the highest point 521 m above sea level. It has been identified by BirdLife International as an Important Bird Area because it supports populations of critically endangered yellow-crested cockatoos and endangered Tanahjampea monarchs.
