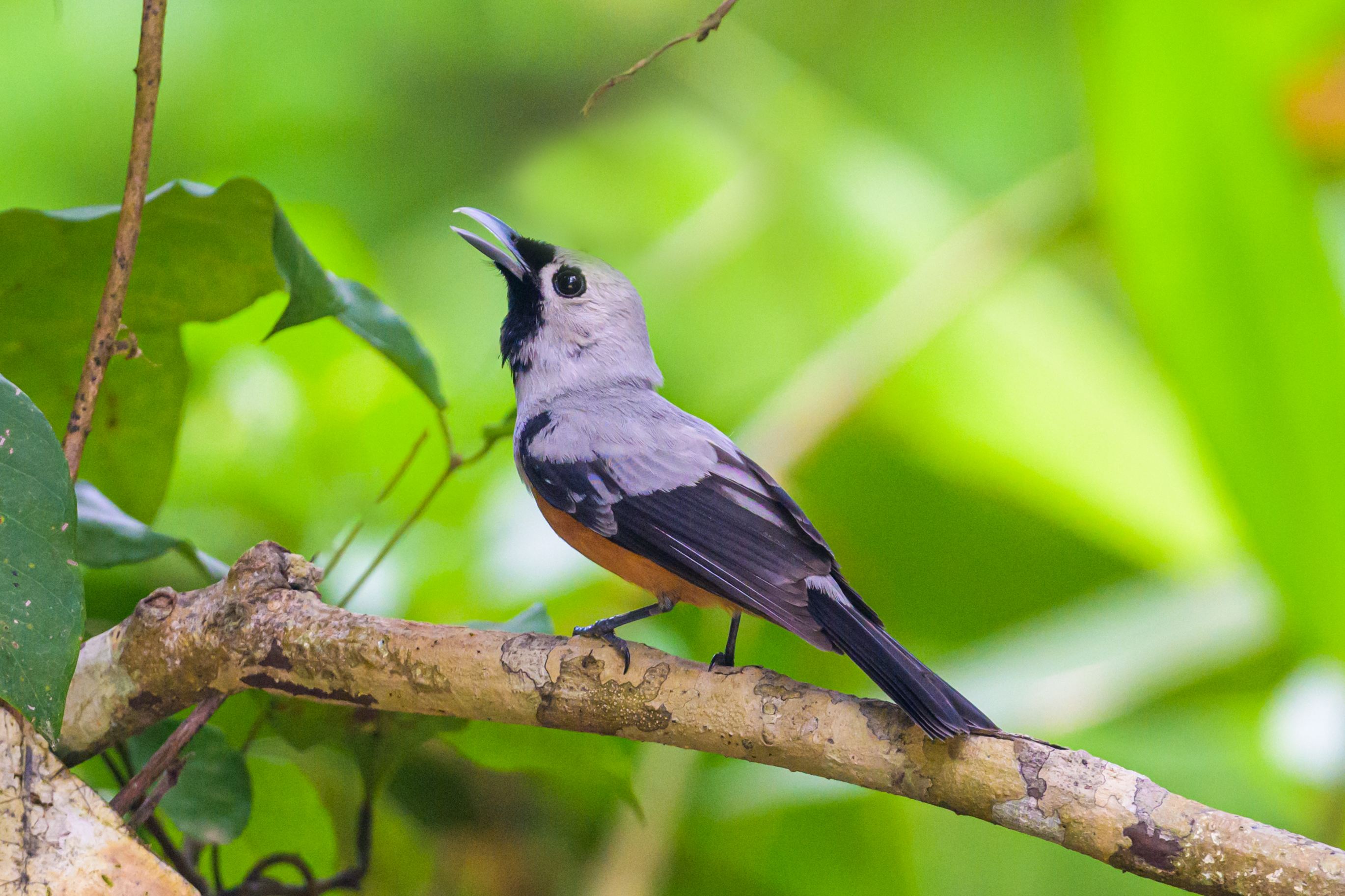

Conservation status
- Least Concern (IUCN 3.1)

Scientific classification
- Kingdom: Animalia
- Phylum: Chordata
- Class: Aves
- Order: Passeriformes
- Family: Monarchidae
- Genus: Monarcha
- Species: M. frater

Binomial name
- Monarcha frater P.L. Sclater, 1874

Subspecies
- See text

= Black-winged monarch =

Species of bird

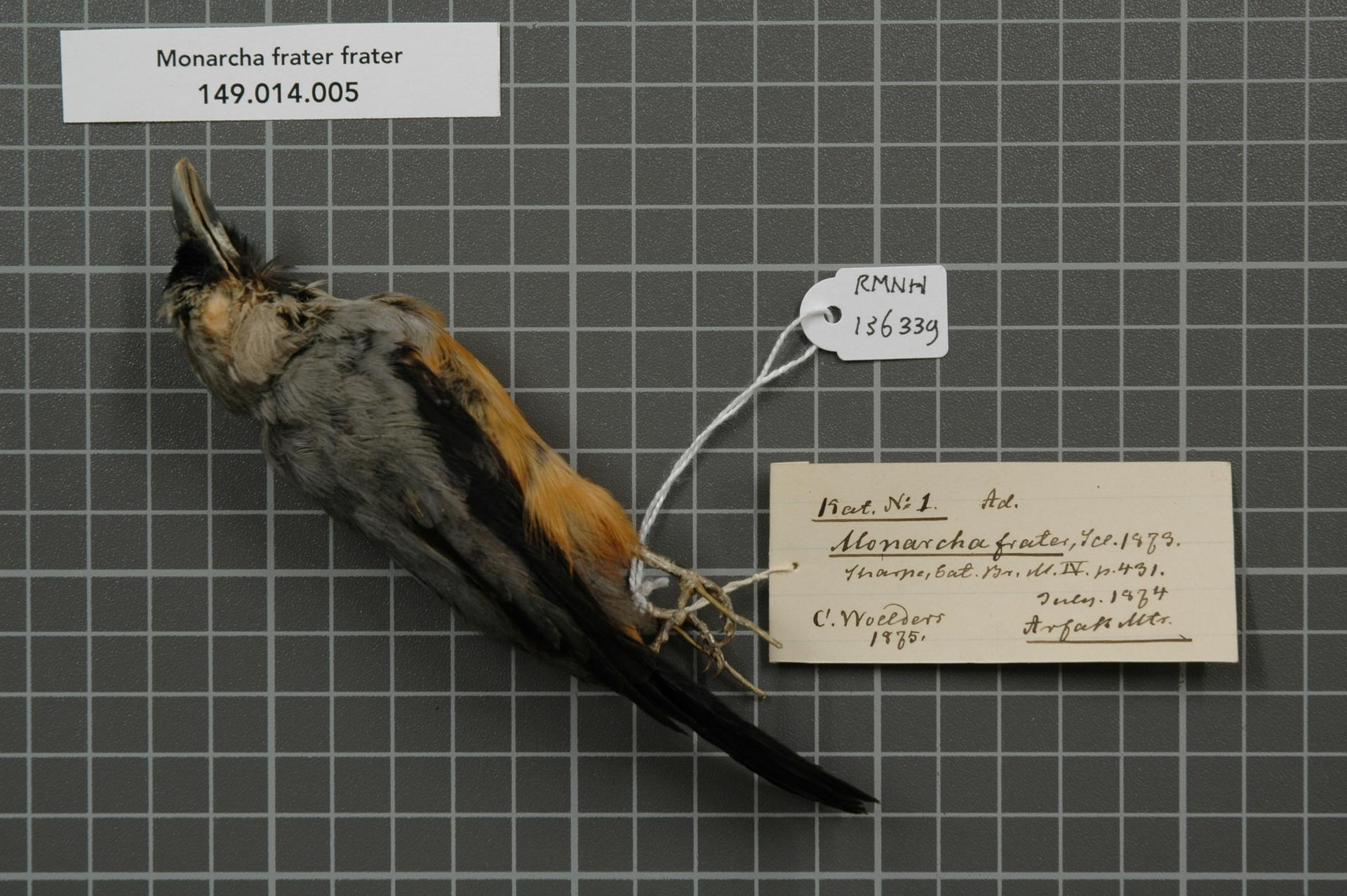
Naturalis Biodiversity Center specimen

The black-winged monarch (Monarcha frater) is a species of bird in the family Monarchidae. It is found in Australia and on New Guinea. Its natural habitats are subtropical or tropical moist lowland forests and subtropical or tropical moist montane forests.

== Taxonomy and systematics ==
Alternate names for the black-winged monarch include the black-chinned flycatcher, black-chinned monarch, black-winged flycatcher and black-winged monarch flycatcher. The alternate name 'black-chinned monarch' should not be confused with the species of the same name, Symposiachrus boanensis.

=== Subspecies ===
Four subspecies are recognized:

- M. f. frater – P.L. Sclater, 1874: Found in north-western New Guinea
- M. f. kunupi – Hartert & Paludan, 1934: Found in west-central New Guinea
- M. f. periophthalmicus – Sharpe, 1882: Originally described as a separate species. Found in central and south-eastern New Guinea
- Pearly monarch (M. f. canescens) or pearly flycatcher – Salvadori, 1876: Originally described as a separate species. Found on islands in the Torres Strait and north-eastern Australia
