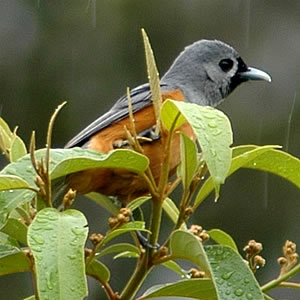
- Black-faced monarch (Monarcha melanopsis)

Scientific classification
- Kingdom: Animalia
- Phylum: Chordata
- Class: Aves
- Order: Passeriformes
- Family: Monarchidae
- Genus: Monarcha; Vigors & Horsfield, 1827

Type species
- Muscipeta carinata Swainson, 1830

Synonyms
- Monarcharses; Monarches

= Monarcha =

Genus of birds

Monarcha is a genus of bird in the family Monarchidae. They are found in Australia and Melanesia.

== Taxonomy and systematics ==
The genus Monarcha was introduced by naturalists Nicholas Vigors and Thomas Horsfield in 1827 with the black-faced monarch (Monarcha melanopsis) as the type species. The genus formerly included many more species. Based on the results of a molecular phylogenetic study published in 2005 nineteen species were moved to the resurrected genus Symposiachrus and three to Carterornis.

=== Extant species ===
The genus Monarcha contains the following seven species:

Image	Common name	Scientific name	Distribution
	Island monarch	Monarcha cinerascens	Sulawesi to the Solomon Islands.
	Black-faced monarch	Monarcha melanopsis	Australia and New Guinea
	Black-winged monarch	Monarcha frater	Australia and New Guinea
	Chestnut-bellied monarch includes Bougainville monarch	Monarcha castaneiventris	Solomon Islands.
	White-capped monarch	Monarcha richardsii	Western Province in the Solomon Islands.
	Yap monarch	Monarcha godeffroyi	Yap Main Islands, Micronesia.
	Tinian monarch	Monarcha takatsukasae	Northern Mariana Islands.

=== Former species ===
Formerly, some authorities also considered the following species (or subspecies) as species within the genus Monarcha:

- Black-naped monarch (as Monarcha azurea)
- Rarotonga monarch (as Monarches dimidiatus)
- Marquesan monarch (as Monarcha mendozae)
- Black monarch (as Monarcha axillaris)
- Black-bibbed monarch (as Monarcha mundus)
- Flores monarch (as Monarcha sacerdotum)
- Boano monarch (as Monarcha boanensis)
- Spectacled monarch (as Monarcha trivirgatus)
- Spectacled monarch (Seram) (as Monarcha nigrimentum)
- Spectacled monarch (bernsteinii) (as Monarcha bernsteini)
- Spectacled monarch (melanopterus) (as Monarcha melanoptera)
- Spectacled monarch (albiventris) (as Monarcha albiventris)
- Spectacled monarch (gouldii) (as Monarcha gouldii)
- Kai monarch (as Monarcha leucurus)
- Tanahjampea monarch (as Monarcha everetti)
- Kofiau monarch (as Monarcha julianae)
- Biak monarch (as Monarcha brehmii)
- Manus monarch (as Monarcha infelix)
- Mussau monarch (as Monarcha menckei)
- Black-tailed monarch (as Monarcha verticalis)
- Djaul monarch (as Monarcha ateralba)
- Solomons monarch (as Monarcha barbata)
- Malaita monarch (as Monarcha malaitae)
- Kolombangara monarch (as Monarcha browni or Monarcha kulambangrae)
- Kolombangara monarch (nigrotectus) (as Monarcha nigrotectus)
- White-collared monarch (as Monarcha vidua or Monarcha viduus)
- White-eared monarch (as Monarcha leucotis)
- White-naped monarch (as Monarcha pileatus)
- White-naped monarch (buruensis) (as Monarcha buruensis)
- Tanimbar monarch (as Monarcha castus)
- Golden monarch (as Monarcha chrysomela)
- Golden monarch (aruensis) (as Monarcha aruensis)
- Golden monarch (melanonotus) (as Monarcha melanonotus)
- Golden monarch (kordensis) (as Monarcha kordensis)
- Ochre-collared monarch (as Monarcha insularis)
- Shining flycatcher (as Monarcha alecto)
- Velvet flycatcher (as Monarcha hebetior)
