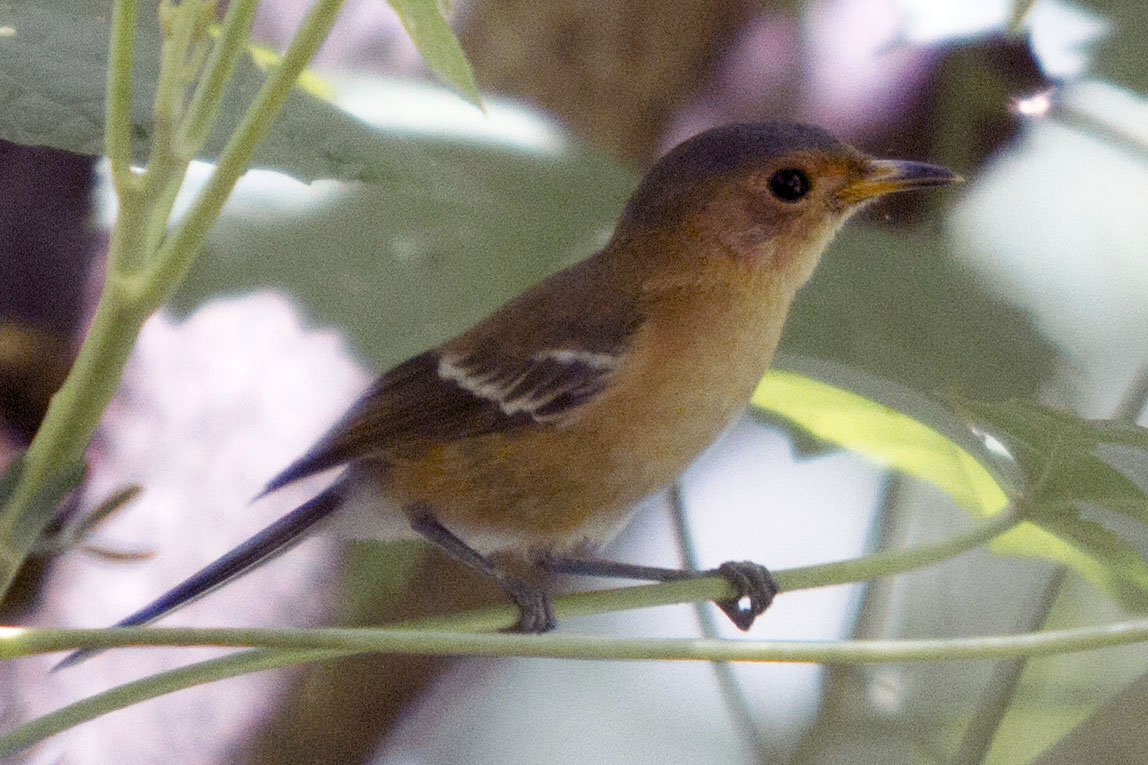

Conservation status
- Near Threatened (IUCN 3.1)

Scientific classification
- Kingdom: Animalia
- Phylum: Chordata
- Class: Aves
- Order: Passeriformes
- Family: Monarchidae
- Genus: Monarcha
- Species: M. takatsukasae

Binomial name
- Monarcha takatsukasae (Yamashina, 1931)

Synonyms
- Metabolus takatsukasae; Monarcharses takatsukasae

= Tinian monarch =

Species of bird

The Tinian monarch (Monarcha takatsukasae) is a species of bird in the family Monarchidae. It is endemic to the Northern Mariana Islands. It was formerly found only on Tinian, but was introduced to Guguan in 2015–2016. It is threatened by habitat loss.

== Taxonomy and systematics ==
The species was first described by Yoshimaro Yamashina in 1931, then under the name Monarcharses takatsukasae – Monarcharses later being synonymized with Monarcha. The specific name takatsukasae honors the Japanese statesman and ornithologist Nobusuke Takatsukasa.

BirdLife International has assigned the species, along with the Yap monarch (M. godeffroyi), to Metabolus, which is otherwise monotypic, with the Chuuk monarch (Metabolus rugensis) as its only member. A 2015 molecular phylogenetics study recovered the Tinian monarch, the Yap monarch and the Chuuk monarch as parts of an unresolved polytomy at the base of Monarcha, but also recovered the Tahiti monarch (Pomarea nigra) and Rarotonga monarch (Pomarea dimidiata) as parts of this polytomy. The study warned against overinterpretation of the unclear results, but as of 2026 no further research on the matter has been published. Pending better evidence, AviList has chosen to not to attempt a taxonomic revision, taking into consideration that no alternative arrangement has enough support and the significant nomenclatural ramifications that moving the Tahiti monarch – the type species of Pomaerea – would have.

== Distribution and habitat ==
The Tinian monarch is endemic to the US territory of the Northern Mariana Islands. It was previously only found on Tinian, but was introduced to Guguan, Northern Mariana Islands in 2015–2016 where it has now bred successfully. The natural habitats of the Tinian monarch are subtropical or tropical moist lowland forest and subtropical or tropical moist shrubland.

== Status ==
The current population of Tinian monarchs is estimated to be over 38,000 individuals. The Tinian monarch is threatened by habitat loss, and its most recent IUCN Red List assessment, in 2022, considered it to be a near-threatened species.
