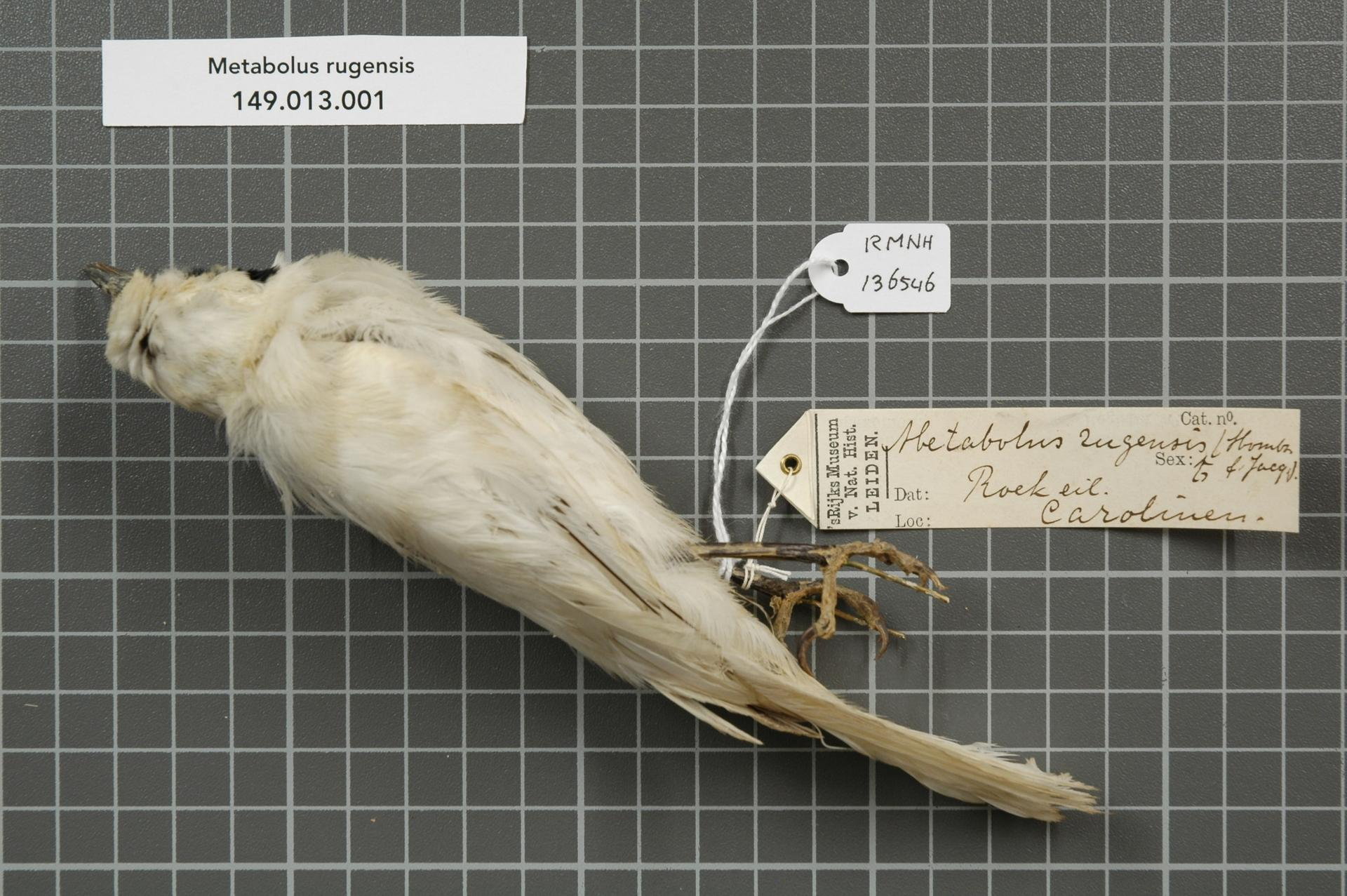

Scientific classification
- Domain: Eukaryota
- Kingdom: Animalia
- Phylum: Chordata
- Class: Aves
- Order: Passeriformes
- Family: Monarchidae
- Genus: Metabolus; Bonaparte, 1854

= Metabolus =

Genus of birds

Metabolus is a monotypic genus of bird in the family Monarchidae found in Australia and Melanesia.

== Taxonomy and systematics ==
=== Extant species ===
The genus Metabolus presently contains only a single species:

- Chuuk monarch (Metabolus rugensis)

=== Former species ===
Formerly, some authorities also considered the following species (or subspecies) as species within the genus Metabolus:

- Yap monarch (as Metabolus godeffroyi)
- Tinian monarch (as Metabolus takatsukasae)
