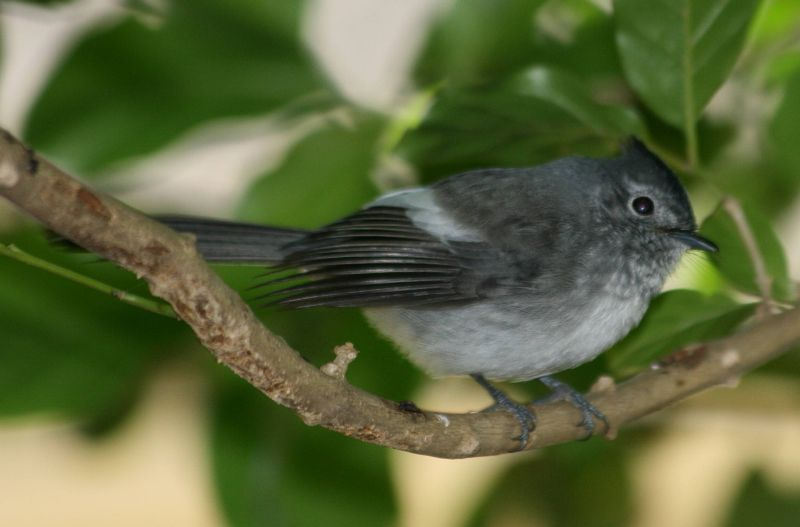
- Female photographed in Pietermaritzburg, South Africa.

Conservation status
- Least Concern (IUCN 3.1)

Scientific classification
- Kingdom: Animalia
- Phylum: Chordata
- Class: Aves
- Order: Passeriformes
- Family: Monarchidae
- Genus: Trochocercus
- Species: T. cyanomelas

Binomial name
- Trochocercus cyanomelas (Vieillot, 1818)

Subspecies
- See text

Synonyms
- Muscicapa cyanomelas; Terpsiphone cyanomelas

= Blue-mantled crested flycatcher =

Species of bird

The blue-mantled crested flycatcher or African crested flycatcher (Trochocercus cyanomelas) is a species of bird in the family Monarchidae found in eastern and south-eastern Africa.

Its natural habitats are subtropical or tropical dry forests and subtropical or tropical moist lowland forests.

== Taxonomy and systematics ==
The blue-mantled crested flycatcher was originally described in the genus Muscicapa and some authorities have also classified it in the genus Terpsiphone. Alternate names for the blue-mantled crested flycatcher include blue-mantled flycatcher, blue-mantled paradise-flycatcher, Cape crested-flycatcher and crested flycatcher.

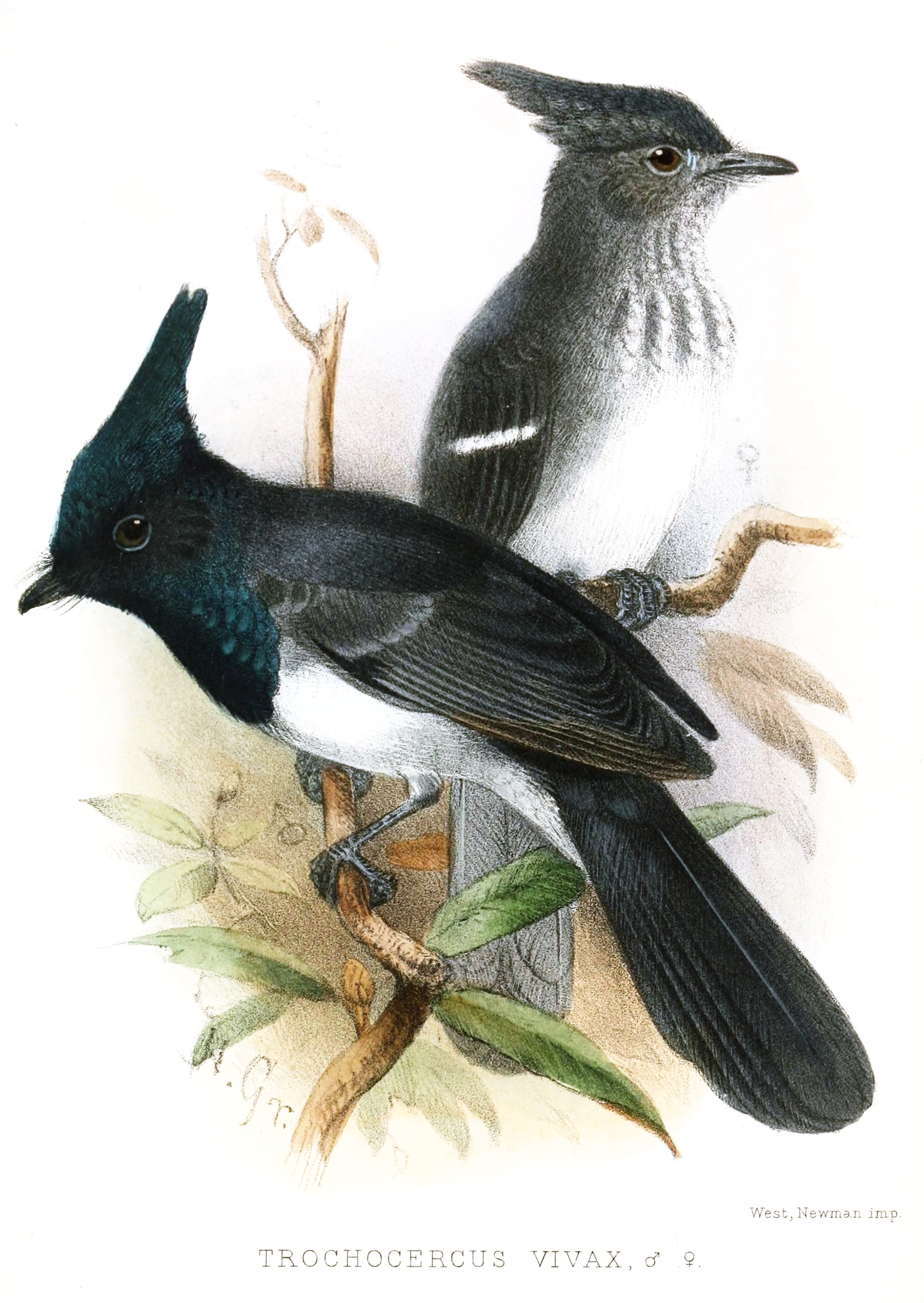
T. c. vivax

=== Subspecies ===
Five subspecies are recognized:

- T. c. vivax - Neave, 1909: Found from Uganda and north-western Tanzania to south-eastern Democratic Republic of the Congo and northern and western Zambia
- East African crested flycatcher (T. c. bivittatus) - Reichenow, 1879: Originally described as a separate species. Found from Somalia to eastern Tanzania
- T. c. megalolophus - Swynnerton, 1907: Originally described as a separate species. Found from Malawi and northern Mozambique to Zimbabwe and eastern KwaZulu-Natal (north-eastern South Africa)
- T. c. segregus - Clancey, 1975: Found in eastern Northern Province and western KwaZulu-Natal (north-eastern South Africa)
- T. c. cyanomelas - (Vieillot, 1818): Found in south and south-eastern South Africa

== Diet ==
Like all members of the monarch flycatcher family, the blue-mantled crested flycatcher is insectivorous.
