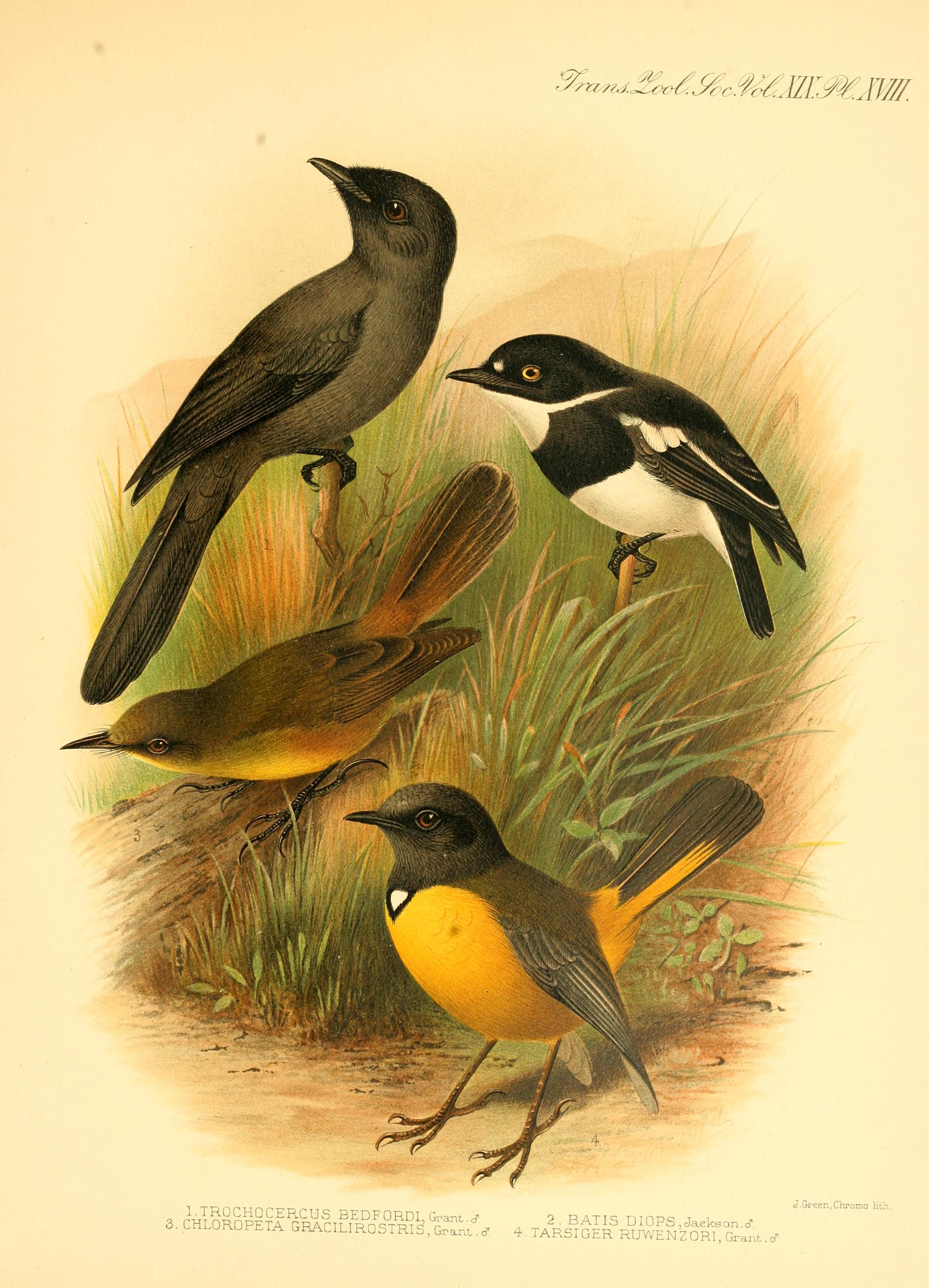
- top left

Conservation status
- Least Concern (IUCN 3.1)

Scientific classification
- Kingdom: Animalia
- Phylum: Chordata
- Class: Aves
- Order: Passeriformes
- Family: Monarchidae
- Genus: Terpsiphone
- Species: T. bedfordi

Binomial name
- Terpsiphone bedfordi (Ogilvie-Grant, 1907)

Synonyms
- Tchitrea bedfordi; Trochocercus bedfordi

= Bedford's paradise flycatcher =

Species of bird

Bedford's paradise flycatcher (Terpsiphone bedfordi) is a species of bird in the family Monarchidae. It is endemic to the Democratic Republic of the Congo.

Its natural habitats are subtropical or tropical dry forest, subtropical or tropical moist lowland forest, and subtropical or tropical moist montane forest. It is threatened by habitat loss.

== Taxonomy and systematics ==
Bedford's paradise flycatcher was originally described in the genus Trochocercus . Alternate names include the Duke of Bedford flycatcher and red-bellied paradise-flycatcher, the latter not to be confused with the species of the same name, Terpsiphone rufiventer.
