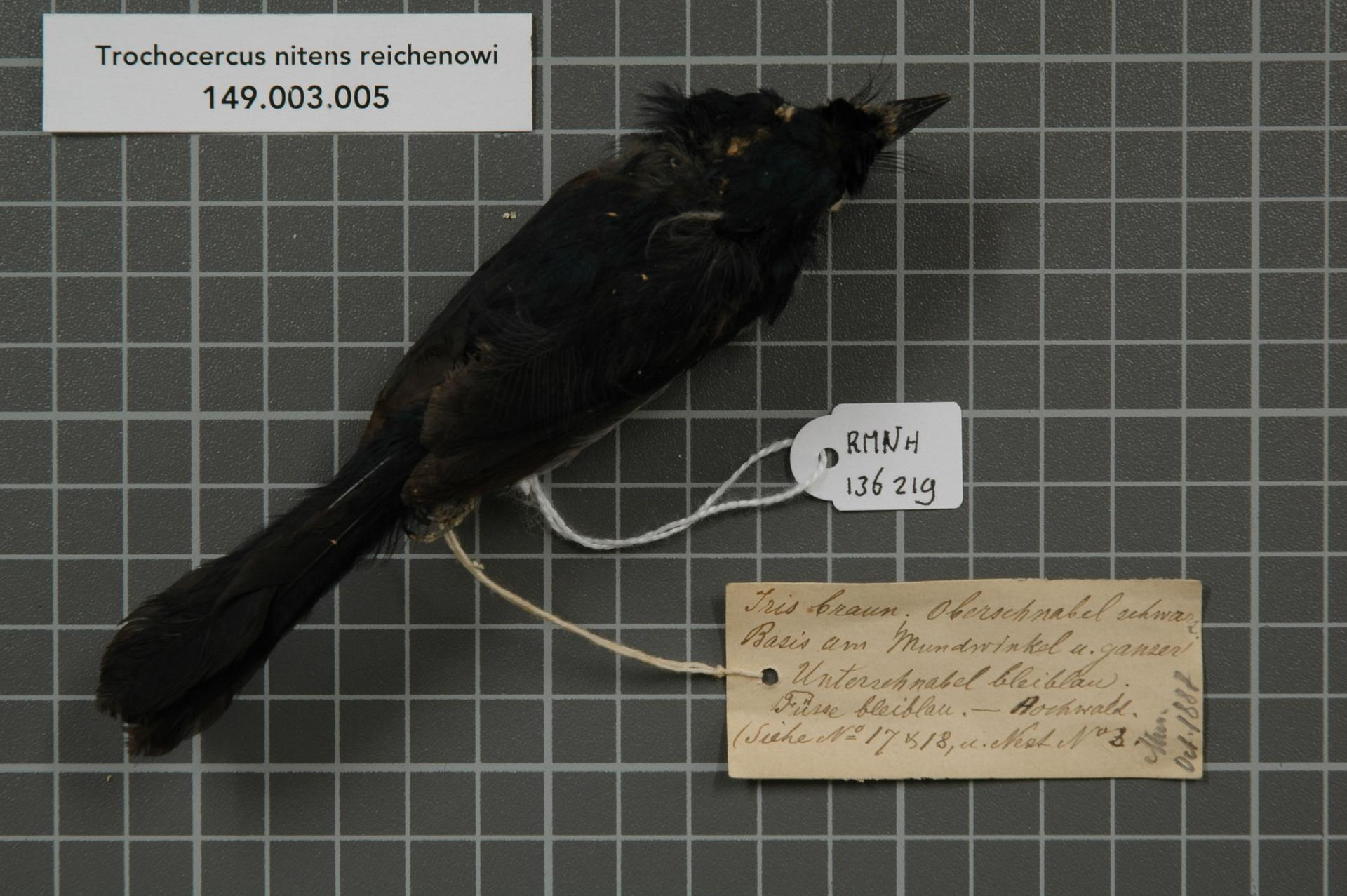

Conservation status
- Least Concern (IUCN 3.1)

Scientific classification
- Kingdom: Animalia
- Phylum: Chordata
- Class: Aves
- Order: Passeriformes
- Family: Monarchidae
- Genus: Trochocercus
- Species: T. nitens

Binomial name
- Trochocercus nitens Cassin, 1859

Subspecies
- See text

Synonyms
- Terpsiphone nitens

= Blue-headed crested flycatcher =

Species of bird

The blue-headed crested flycatcher (Trochocercus nitens) is a species of bird in the family Monarchidae, native to the African tropical forest.

== Taxonomy and systematics ==
Formerly, some authorities have placed the blue-headed crested flycatcher in the genus Terpsiphone. Alternate names include the blue-headed flycatcher and blue-headed paradise-flycatcher.

=== Subspecies ===
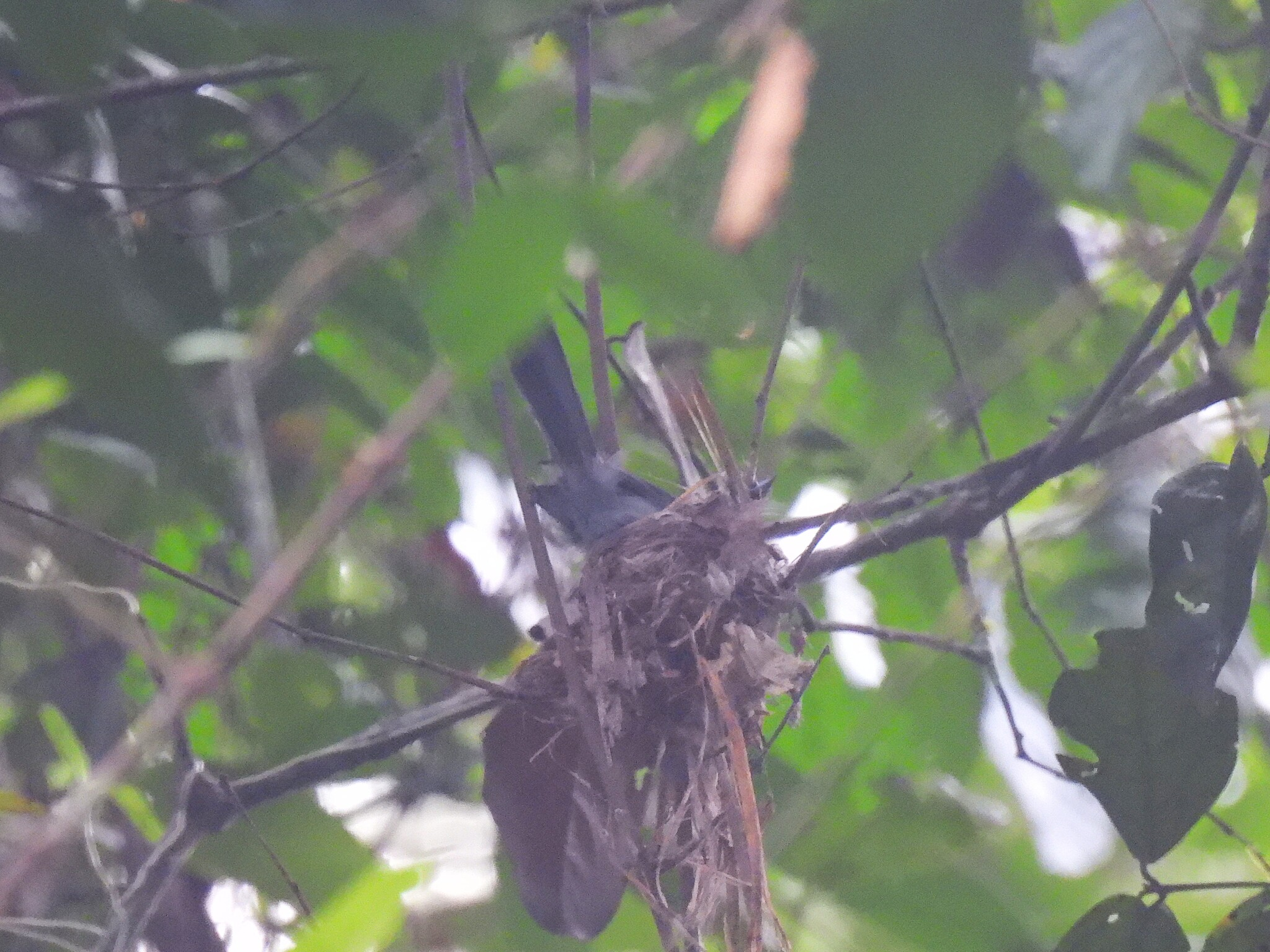
At nest

Two subspecies are recognized:

- Upper Guinea blue-headed crested flycatcher (T. n. reichenowi) - Sharpe, 1904: Originally described as a separate species. Found from Guinea to Togo
- T. n. nitens - Cassin, 1859: Found from Nigeria to southern Sudan, Uganda, Democratic Republic of Congo and northwestern Angola
