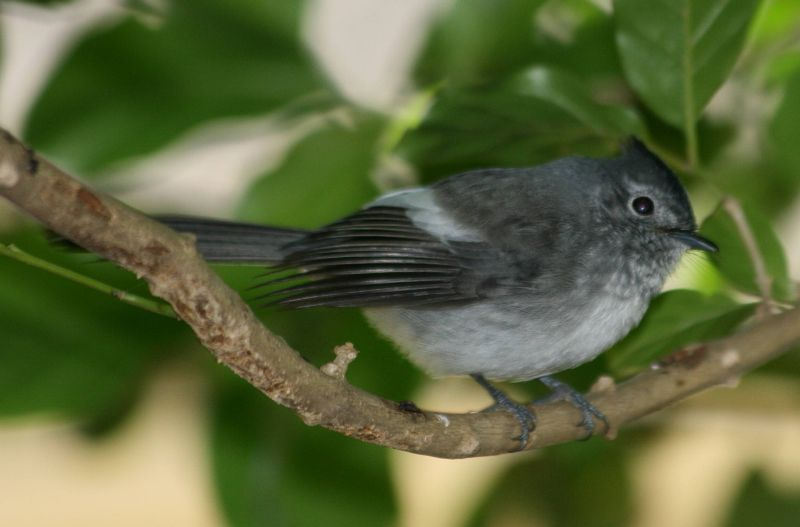
- Female blue-mantled crested flycatcher (Trochocercus cyanomelas)

Scientific classification
- Kingdom: Animalia
- Phylum: Chordata
- Class: Aves
- Order: Passeriformes
- Family: Monarchidae
- Genus: Trochocercus; Cabanis, 1851

Type species
- Muscicapa cyanomelas Vieillot, 1818

= Trochocercus =

Genus of birds

Trochocercus is a genus of bird in the family Monarchidae. Described by Jean Cabanis in 1850, the name Trochocercus is a combination of the Greek words trokhos meaning "circular" or "round" and kerkos, meaning "tail".

== Taxonomy and systematics ==
=== Extant species ===
After three former species were transferred to the genus Elminia in 2009, the genus Trochocercus now contains the following two remaining species:

Image	Scientific name	Common name	Distribution
	Trochocercus cyanomelas	Blue-mantled crested flycatcher	south-eastern Africa
	Trochocercus nitens	Blue-headed crested flycatcher	African tropical rainforest

=== Former species ===
Formerly, some authorities also considered the following species (or subspecies) as species within the genus Trochocercus:

- Bedford's paradise flycatcher (as Trochocercus bedfordi)
- Dusky crested flycatcher (as Trochocercus nigromitratus)
- White-bellied crested flycatcher (as Trochocercus albiventris)
- White-tailed crested flycatcher (as Trochocercus albicaudatus or Trochocercus albonotata)
