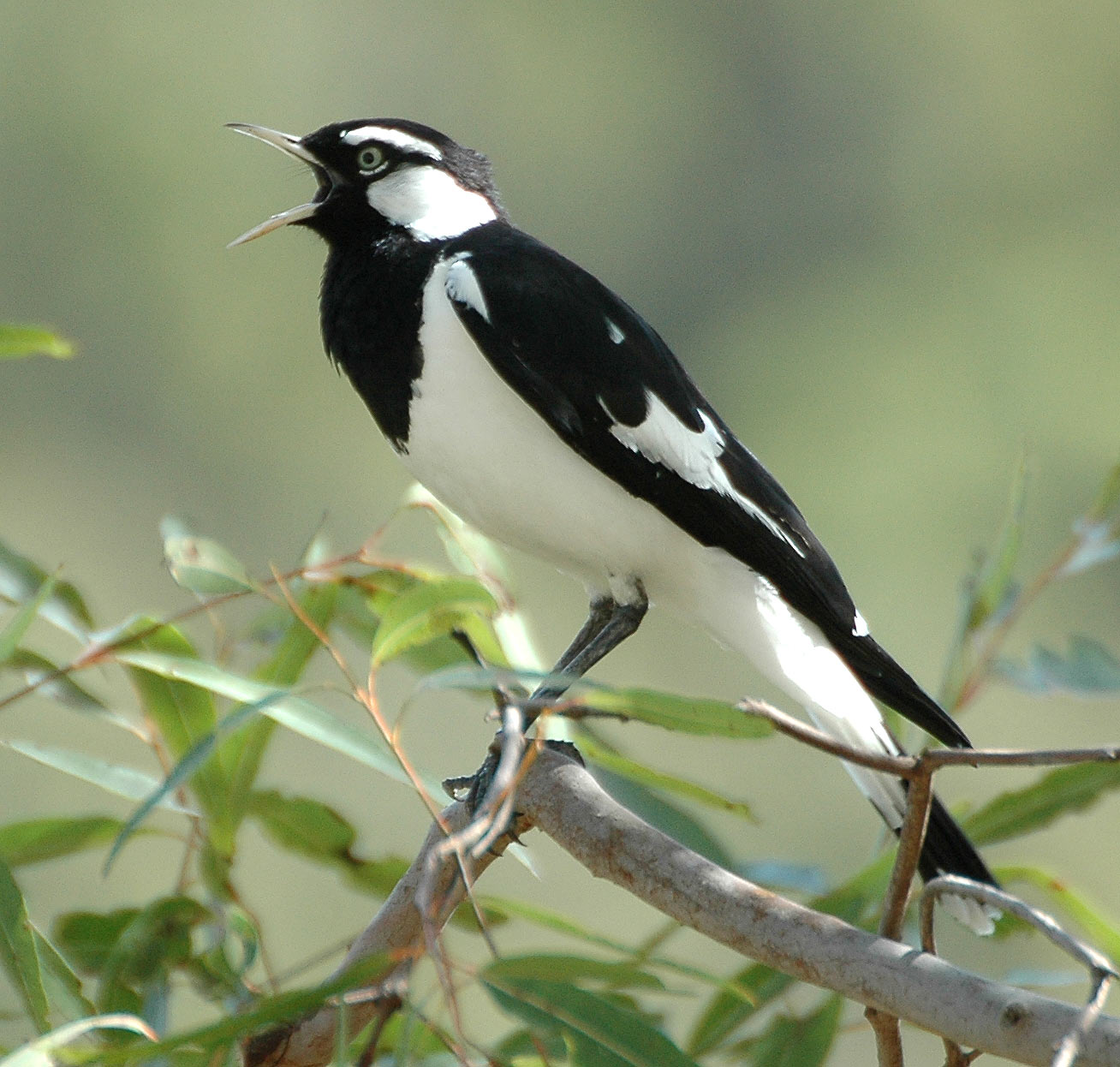
- Male magpie-lark (Grallina cyanoleuca)

Scientific classification
- Kingdom: Animalia
- Phylum: Chordata
- Class: Aves
- Order: Passeriformes
- Family: Monarchidae
- Genus: Grallina; Vieillot, 1816

Type species
- Grallina melanoleuca Vieillot, 1816

Species
- See text

Synonyms
- Tanypus

= Grallina =

Genus of birds

Grallina is a genus of passerine bird native to Australia and New Guinea. It is a member of a group of birds termed monarch flycatchers.

== Taxonomy ==
=== Higher taxonomy ===
Long thought to be a member of the mudnest builder family Corcoracidae, the magpie-lark and torrent-lark have been reclassified in the family Monarchidae (the monarch flycatchers). The two make up a lineage that split off early from other monarchs and has no close relatives within the family.

The monarch flycatchers are considered either as a subfamily Monarchinae, together with the fantails as part of the drongo family Dicruridae, or as a family Monarchidae in its own right. More broadly, they belong to the Corvida parvorder comprising many tropical and Australian passerines including pardalotes, fairy-wrens and honeyeaters as well as crows.

=== Species ===
Two species are recognized:

Image	Scientific name	Common name	Distribution
	Grallina cyanoleuca	Magpie-lark	Australia, Timor, and southern New Guinea
	Grallina bruijnii	Torrent-lark	New Guinea
