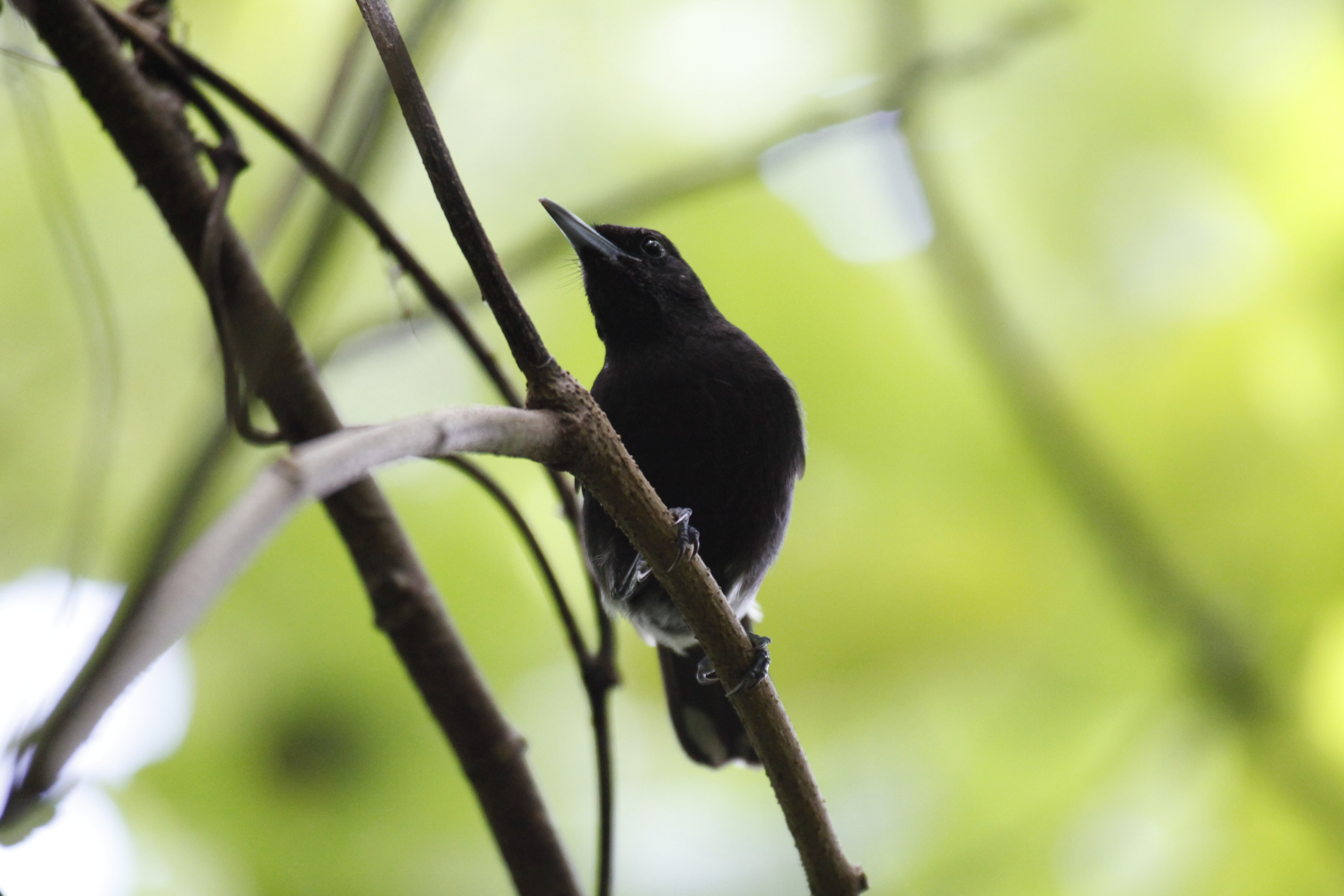
- Adult female
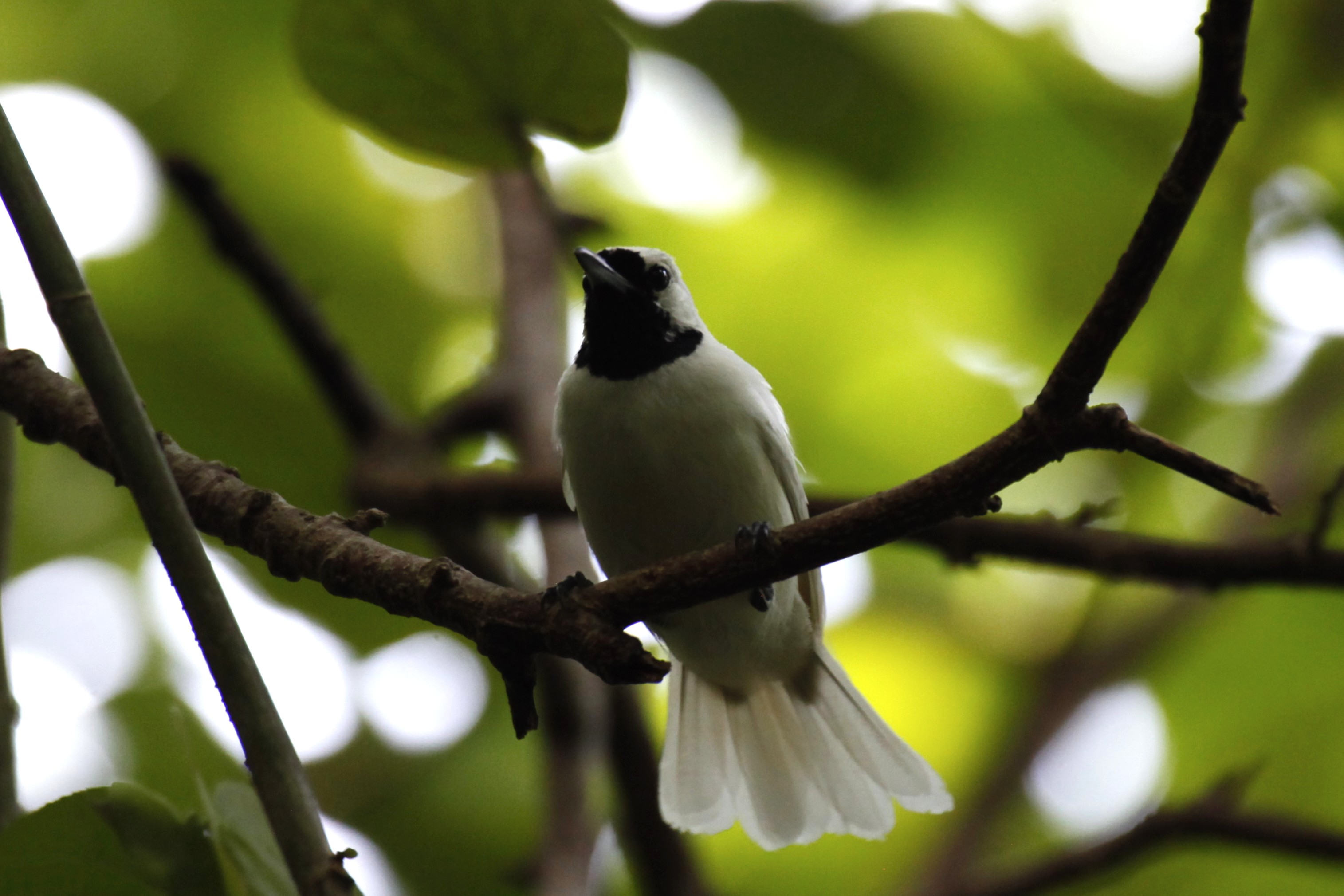
- Adult male

Conservation status
- Endangered (IUCN 3.1)

Scientific classification
- Kingdom: Animalia
- Phylum: Chordata
- Class: Aves
- Order: Passeriformes
- Family: Monarchidae
- Genus: Metabolus
- Species: M. rugensis

Binomial name
- Metabolus rugensis (Hombron & Jacquinot, 1841)

Synonyms
- Muscicapa Rugensis Hombron & Jacquinot, 1841

= Chuuk monarch =

Species of bird

The Chuuk monarch (Metabolus rugensis), or Truk monarch, is a species of bird in the family Monarchidae. It is monotypic within the genus Metabolus. It is endemic to the islands of Chuuk in Micronesia.

== Taxonomy and systematics ==
The Chuuk monarch was originally described as belonging to the genus Muscicapa.

== Description ==
The Chuuk monarch is a large monarch flycatcher, around 20 cm long. The plumage of this species is sexually dimorphic, with the male having almost entirely white plumage with a black face and throat and the female having entirely black plumage. The large bill is pale blue.

== Distribution and habitat ==
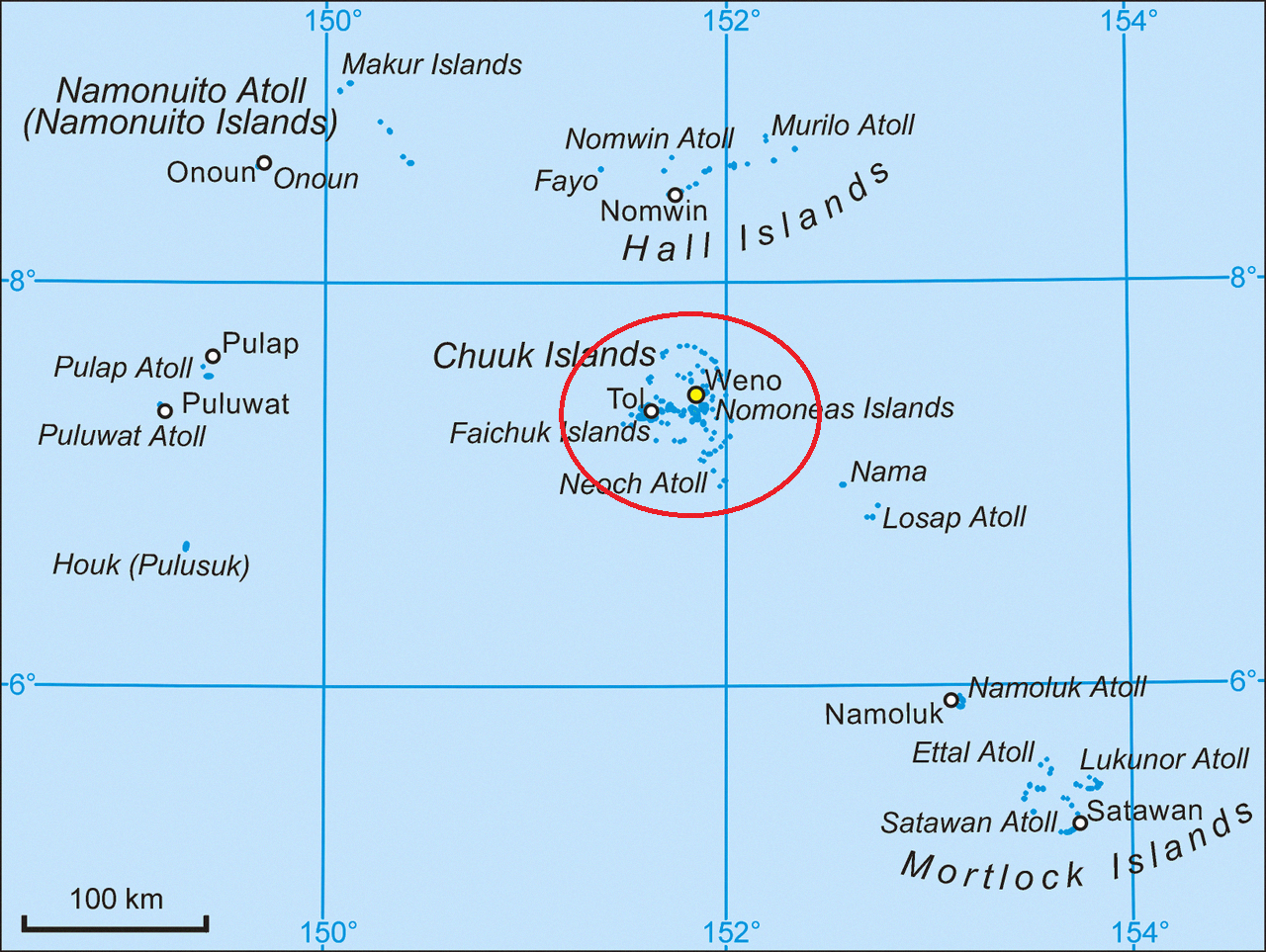
The range of the Chuuk monarch, which is endemic to Chuuk Island

The natural habitats of the Chuuk monarch are subtropical or tropical dry forests, subtropical or tropical mangrove forests, subtropical or tropical moist montane forests, subtropical or tropical moist shrubland, and plantations.

== Threats ==
It is threatened by habitat loss, with the development of the islands and the loss of its forest home.
