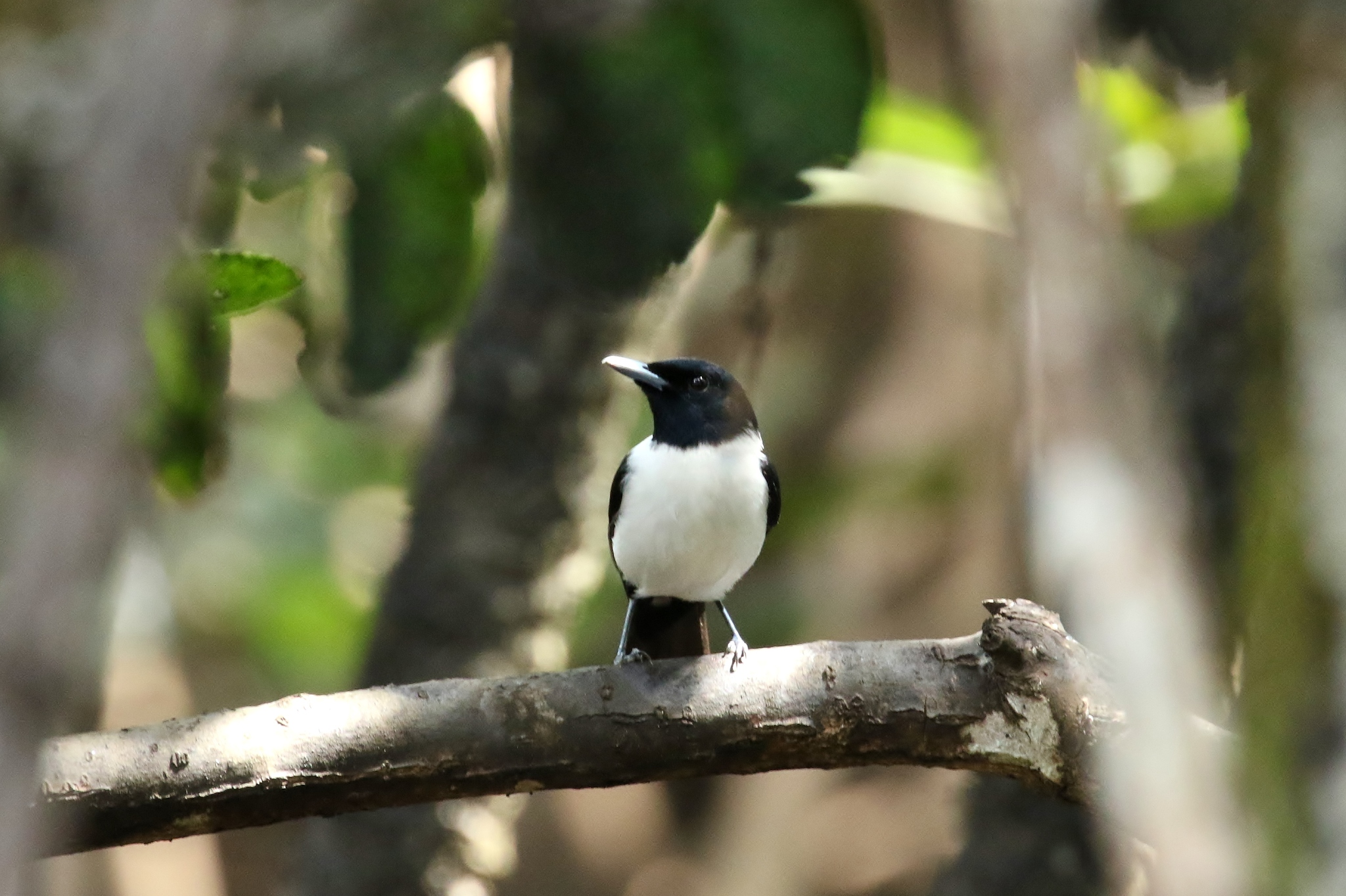
- Male
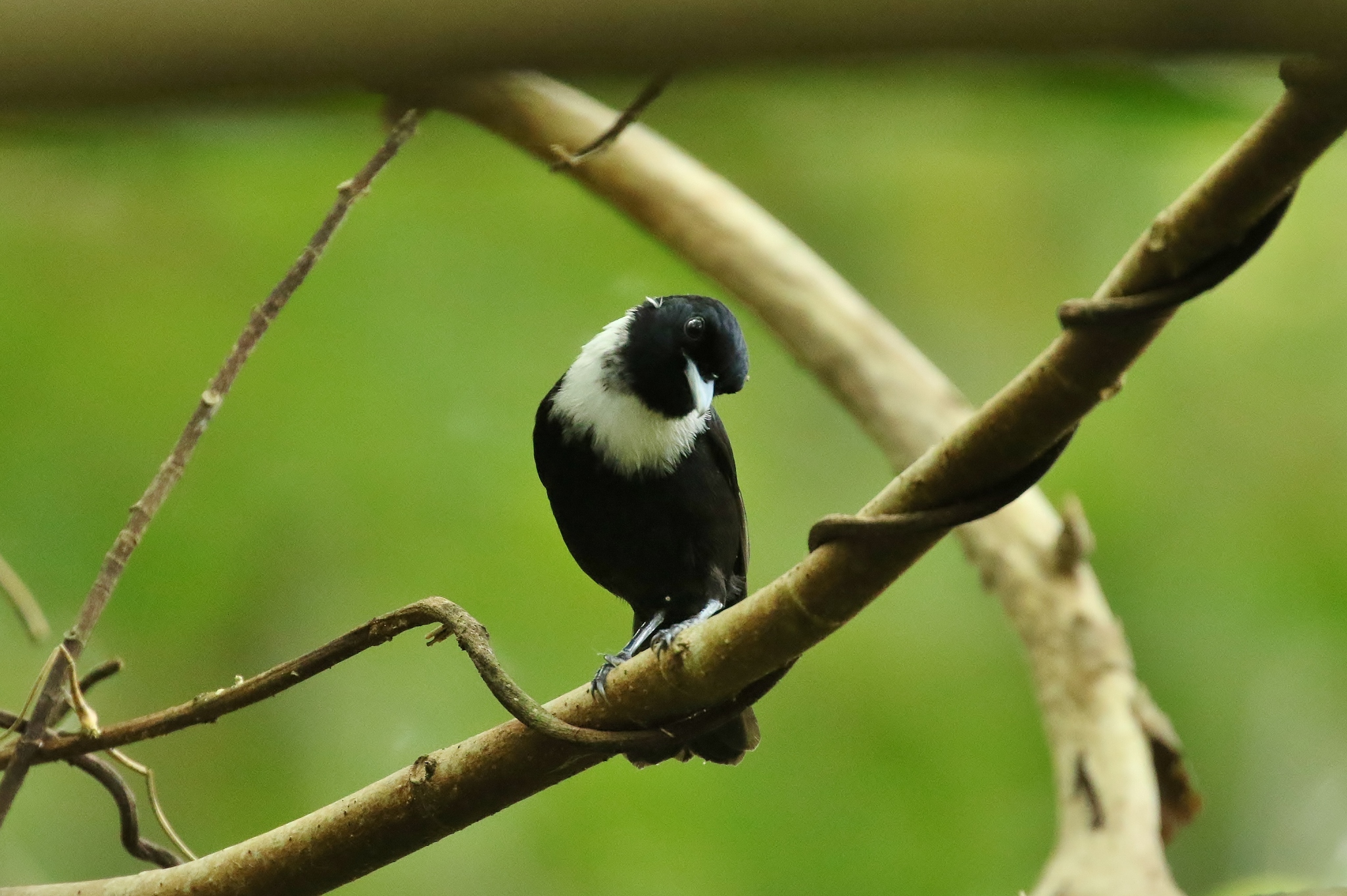
- Female

Conservation status
- Near Threatened (IUCN 3.1)

Scientific classification
- Kingdom: Animalia
- Phylum: Chordata
- Class: Aves
- Order: Passeriformes
- Family: Monarchidae
- Genus: Monarcha
- Species: M. godeffroyi

Binomial name
- Monarcha godeffroyi Hartlaub, 1868

Synonyms
- Metabolus godeffroyi

= Yap monarch =

Species of bird

The Yap monarch (Monarcha godeffroyi), or Yap Island monarch, is a species of bird in the family Monarchidae. It is endemic to the Yap Main Islands, Micronesia. The natives of Yap Island call it "Gigiy" or "Achgigiy". It is the official state bird of Yap, Federated States of Micronesia.

== Description ==
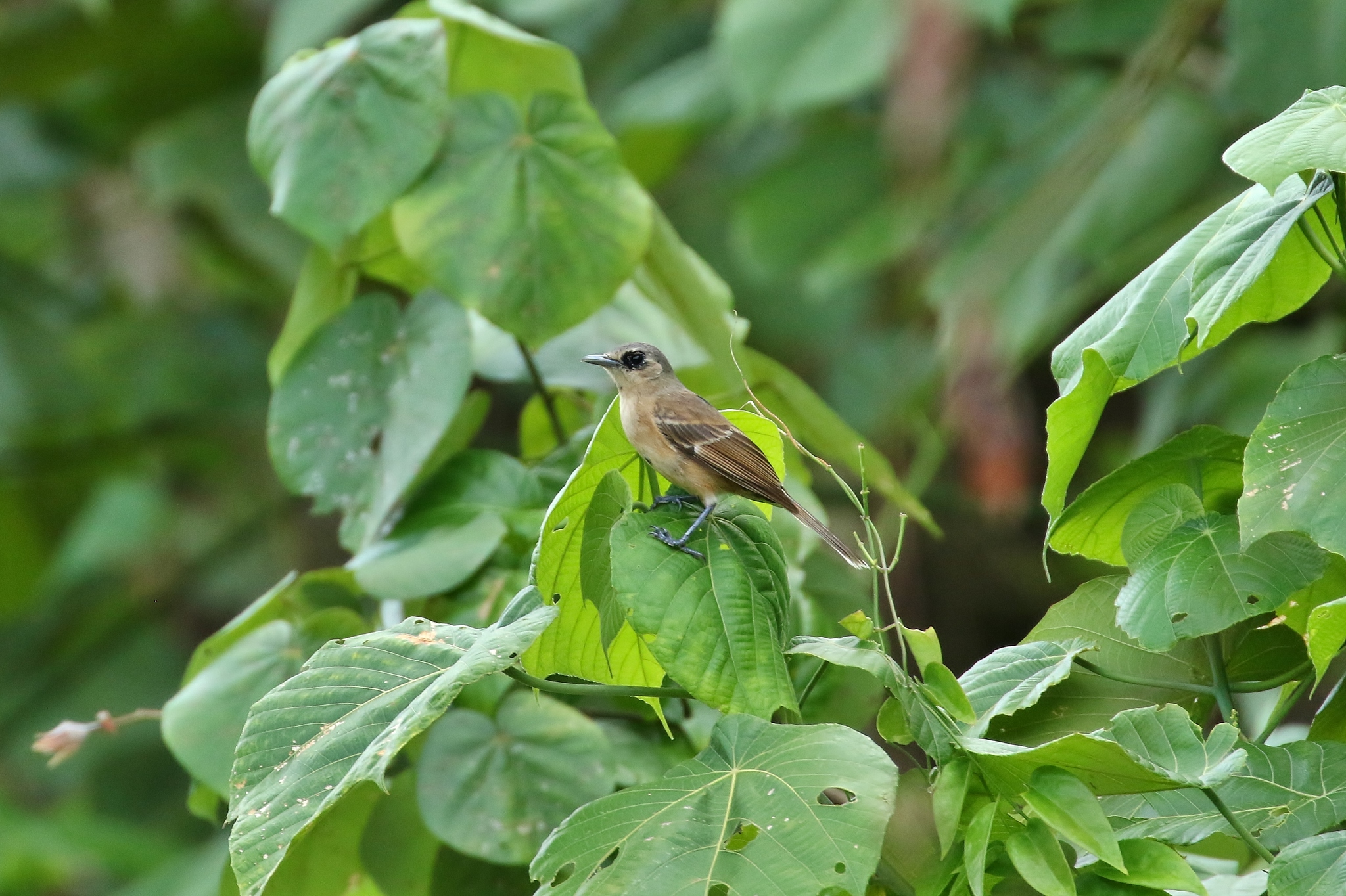
Juvenile

The male has a black head, throat, wings and tail. It has a blue bill, dark iris and dark greyish tail. The female is almost entirely black except for the white collar around its neck. The juvenile is browner than adult with rufous-brown upperparts.

== Voice ==
The song is often described as a loud series of whistles "we're here, we're here" or "wheereo, wheereo". The calls include rasping notes "chick-chick-chick-cher-dee" and a squeaky "weer".

== Habitat ==
Its natural habitats are subtropical or tropical moist lowland forests and subtropical or tropical mangrove forests.
