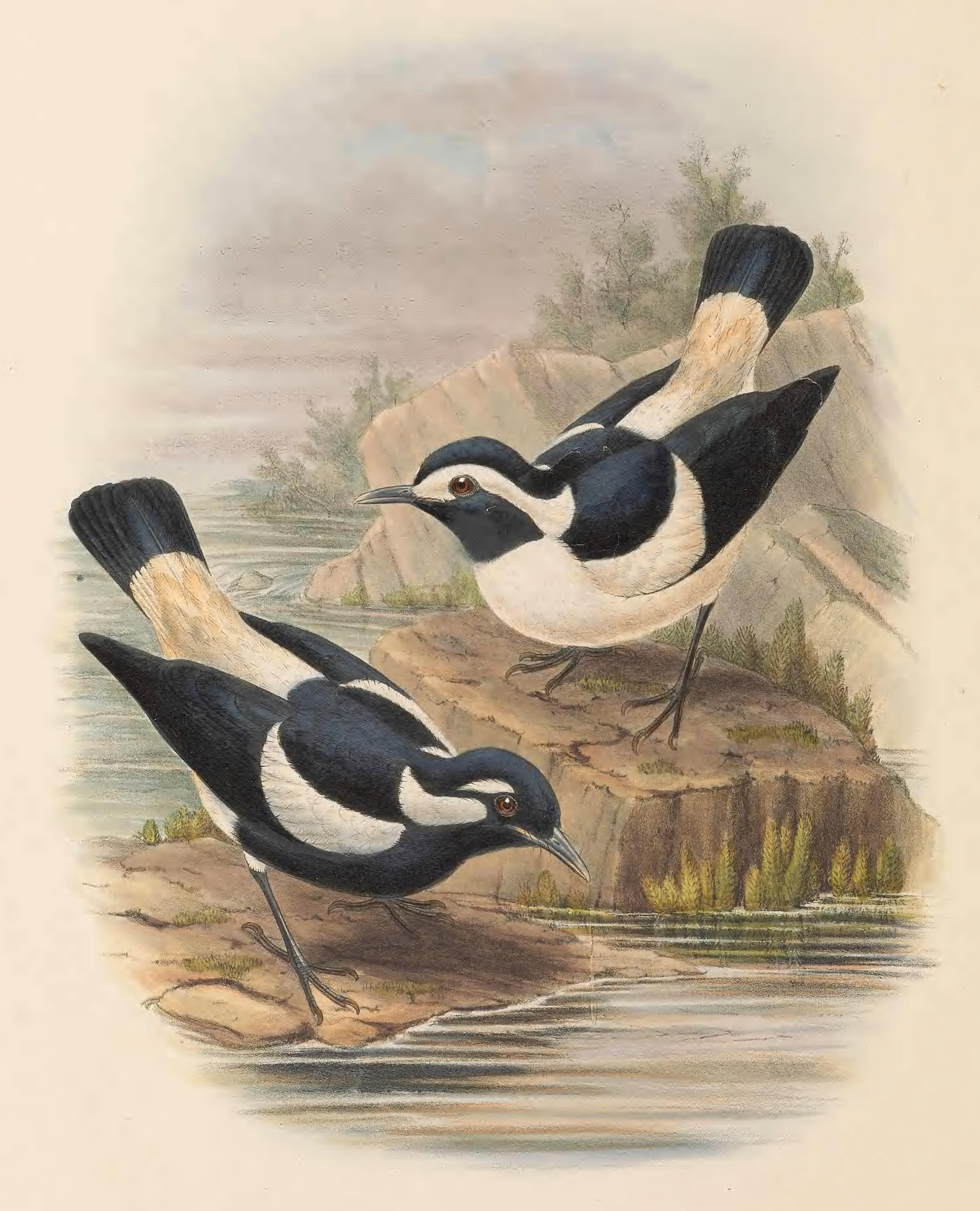
- Male (left) and female (right) by William Matthew Hart

Conservation status
- Least Concern (IUCN 3.1)

Scientific classification
- Kingdom: Animalia
- Phylum: Chordata
- Class: Aves
- Order: Passeriformes
- Family: Monarchidae
- Genus: Grallina
- Species: G. bruijnii

Binomial name
- Grallina bruijnii Salvadori, 1876

Synonyms
- Grallina bruijni

= Torrent-lark =

Species of bird

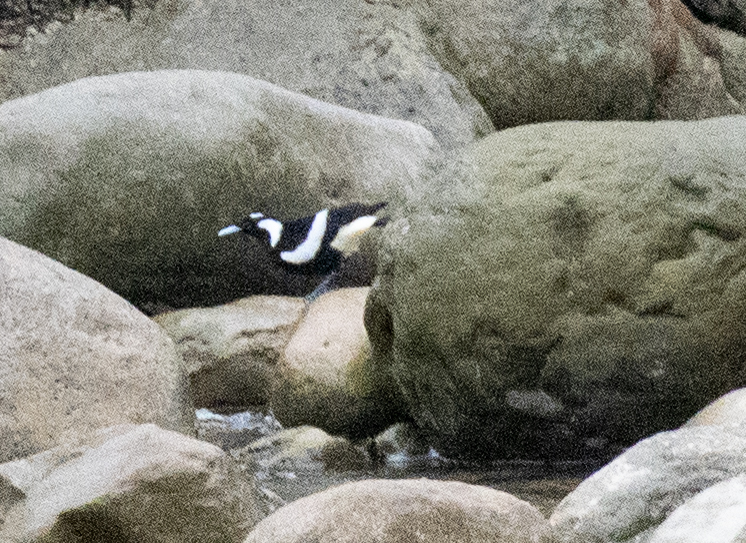
In Western Province, Papua New Guinea

The torrent-lark (Grallina bruijnii) is a species of bird in the family Monarchidae found on New Guinea. Its natural habitats are subtropical or tropical moist lowland forests and subtropical or tropical moist montane forest.

Though most Monarchidae birds make their nests out of plant materials, the torrent-lark makes its nest out of mud.
