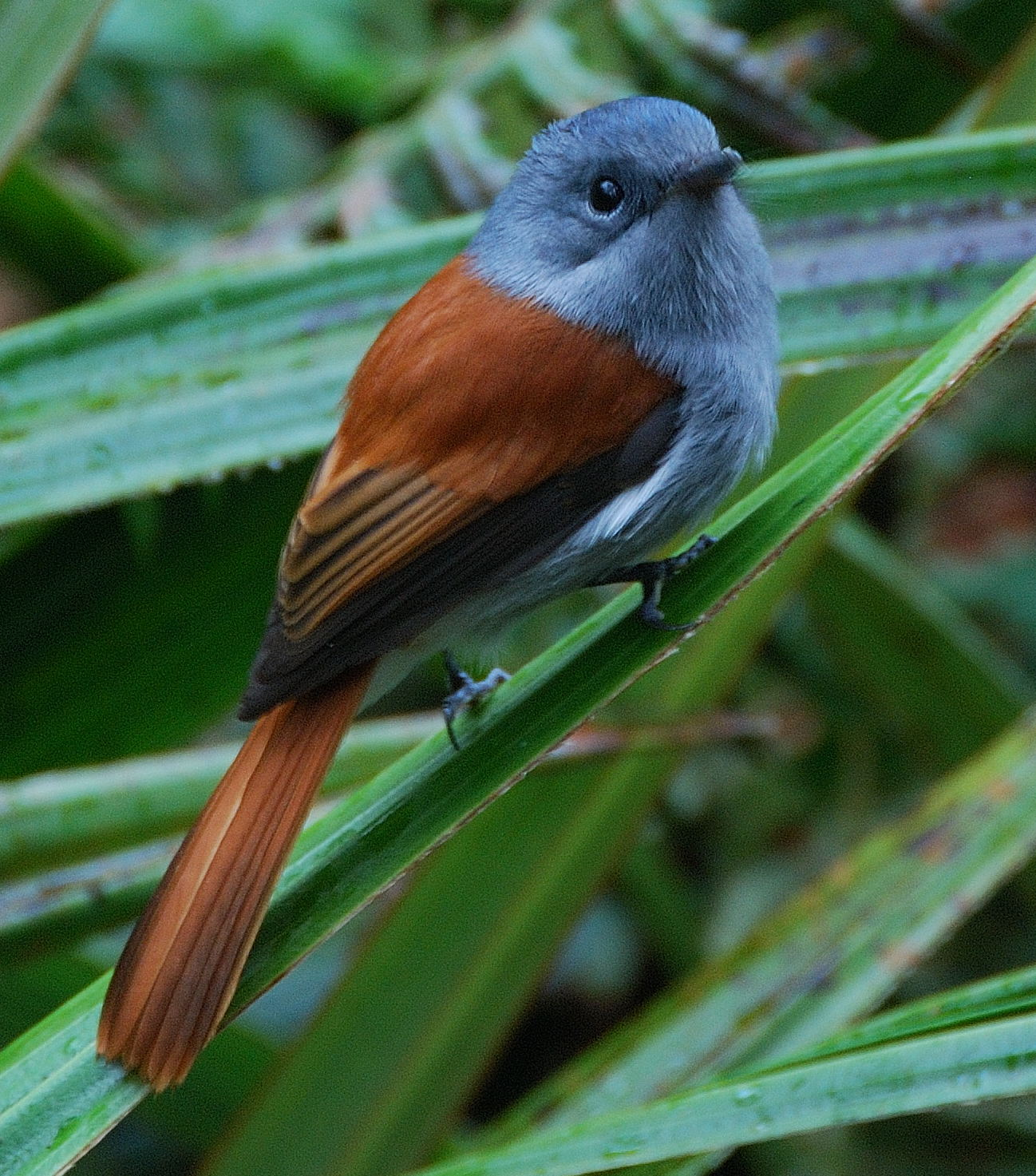
- Mascarene paradise flycatcher (Terpsiphone bourbonnensis)

Scientific classification
- Kingdom: Animalia
- Phylum: Chordata
- Class: Aves
- Order: Passeriformes
- Superfamily: Corvoidea
- Family: Monarchidae; Bonaparte, 1854

Subfamilies
- Terpsiphoninae; Monarchinae

Synonyms
- Grallinidae Mayr, 1950

= Monarch flycatcher =

Monarchidae

Family of birds

The monarchs or monarch flycatchers (family Monarchidae) comprise a family of over 100 passerine birds which includes shrikebills, paradise flycatchers, and magpie-larks.

Monarchids are small insectivorous songbirds with long tails. They inhabit forest or woodland across sub-Saharan Africa, south-east Asia, Australasia, and a number of Pacific islands. Only a few species migrate. Many species decorate their cup-shaped nests with lichen.

== Taxonomy ==
Some of the one hundred or more species making up the family were previously assigned to other groups, largely on the basis of general morphology or behaviour. The magpie-lark, for example, was assigned to the same family as the white-winged chough, since both build unusual nests from mud rather than vegetable matter. That family, Grallinidae, is now considered a synonym of Monarchidae. It was formerly considered to have four species. The magpie-lark and the torrent-lark were moved into Monarchidae, into the genus Grallina, on the basis of molecular evidence. The white-winged chough and the apostlebird were assigned to the family Corcoracidae.

With the new insights generated by the DNA–DNA hybridisation studies of Sibley and his co-workers toward the end of the 20th century, however, it became clear that these apparently unrelated birds were all descended from a common ancestor: the same crow-like ancestor that gave rise to the drongos. On that basis they were previously included as a subfamily of the Dicruridae, along with the fantails, although it is now treated at familial rank as Monarchidae.

More recently, the grouping has been refined somewhat as the original concept of Corvida has proven paraphyletic. The narrower 'Core corvine' group now comprises the crows and ravens, shrikes, birds of paradise, fantails, monarchs, drongos, and mud nest builders.

The monarchs are small to medium-sized insectivorous passerines, many of which hunt by flycatching.

=== Taxonomic list ===
The monarch family has fifteen genera as follows:

FAMILY MONARCHIDAE

- Subfamily Terpsiphoninae
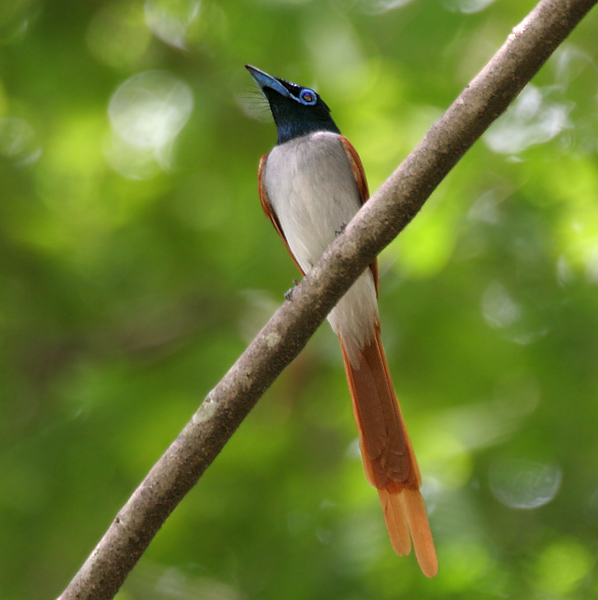
  Indian paradise flycatcher male at Ananthagiri Hills, in Rangareddy district of Andhra Pradesh, India
  - Genus Hypothymis (4 species)
  - Genus Trochocercus (2 species)
  - Genus Terpsiphone – typical paradise flycatchers (17 species)
- Subfamily Monarchinae
  - Genus Chasiempis (3 species)
  - Genus Pomarea (9 species of which 3 extinct)
  - Genus Mayrornis (3 species)
  - Genus Neolalage – buff-bellied monarch
  - Genus Clytorhynchus – shrikebills (5 species)
  - Genus Metabolus – Chuuk monarch
  - Genus Symposiachrus (23 species)
  - Genus Monarcha (9 species)
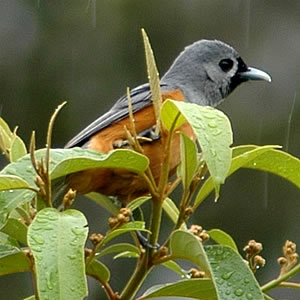
    Black-faced monarch
  - Genus Carterornis (4 species)
  - Genus Arses (4 species)
  - Genus Grallina – magpie-larks (2 species)
  - Genus Myiagra – broad-billed flycatchers (20 species of which 1 extinct)
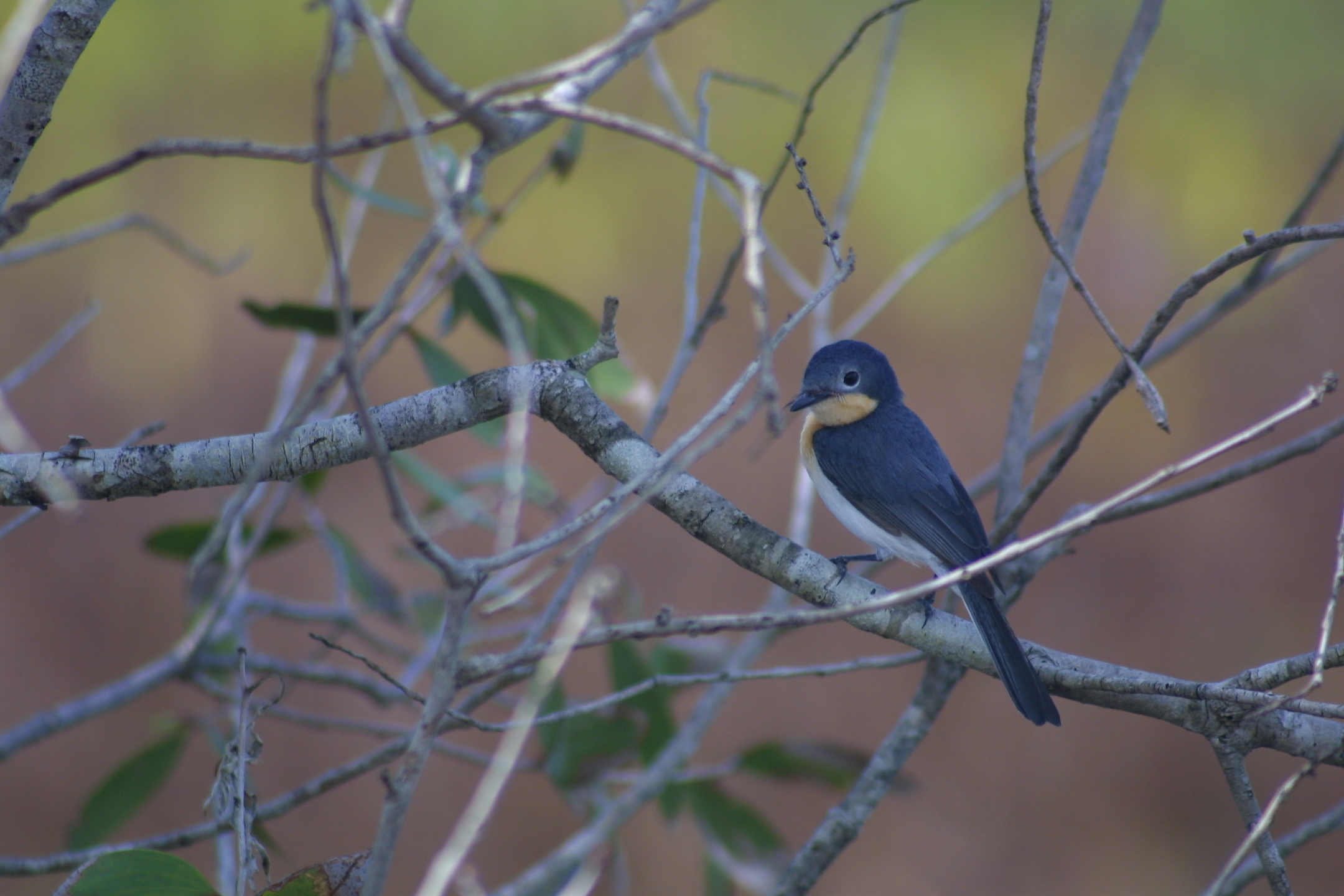
    Broad-billed flycatcher

== Description ==
The monarchs are a diverse family of passerine birds that are generally arboreal (with the exception of the magpie-larks). They are mostly slim birds and possess broad bills. The bills of some species are quite large and the heavy-set bills of the shrikebills are used to probe dead wood and leaves. The plumage of the family ranges from sombre, such as the almost monochrome black monarch, to spectacular, as displayed by the golden monarch. The tails are generally long and spectacularly so in the paradise flycatchers in the genus Terpsiphone. Sexual dimorphism in plumage can be subtle, as in the paperbark flycatcher, where the female is identical to the male except for a slight buff on the throat; strikingly, in the Chuuk monarch, where the male is almost entirely white and the female entirely black; or non-existent, as in the Tahiti monarch. In some species, for example, the Malagasy paradise flycatcher, the males have two or more colour morphs.

== Distribution and habitat ==
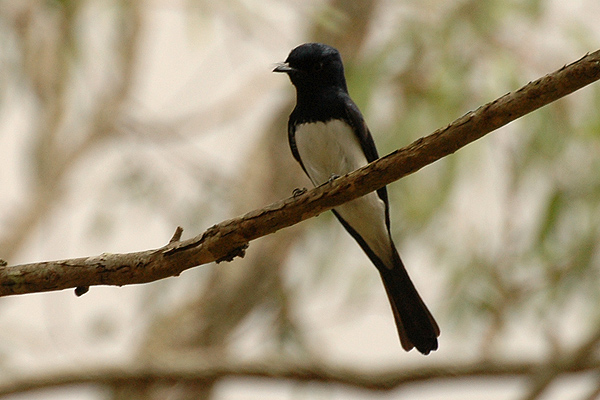
The satin flycatcher is fully migratory, breeding in southern Australia and migrating to northern Australia and New Guinea.

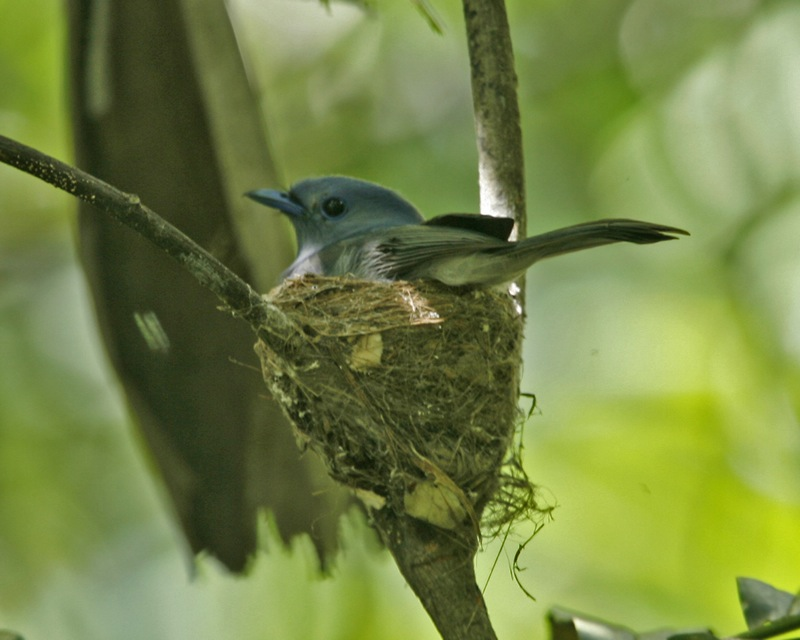
Female pale-blue monarch on a nest constructed on forked branch

The monarchs have a mostly Old World distribution. In the western end of their range, they are distributed through sub-Saharan Africa, Madagascar, and the islands of the tropical Indian Ocean. They also occur in South and Southeastern Asia, north to Japan, down to New Guinea, and most of Australia. The family has managed to reach many Pacific islands, and several endemic genera occur across Micronesia, Melanesia, and Polynesia as far as Hawaii and the Marquesas.

The paradise flycatchers of the genus Terpsiphone have the widest distribution of any of the monarchs, ranging across almost all of sub-Saharan Africa, Madagascar, the Mascarenes and Seychelles, southern and eastern Asia as far as Korea, Afghanistan, the Philippines, and the Lesser Sundas. The other paradise flycatcher genus, Trochocercus, is restricted to Africa. The other exclusively Asian genus is the Hypothymis monarchs. The remaining genera are predominantly found in the Austro-Papuan and Oceania regions. A few monotypic genera are restricted to Pacific islands; these include the Chuuk monarch (Metabolus) in the Micronesian island of Chuuk, the Hawaiian Elepaio (Chasiempis), and the buff-bellied monarch (Neolalage) which is restricted to the islands of Vanuatu. Other Pacific genera are the shrikebills (Clytorhynchus) and the Mayrornis monarchs, both of which are found in Melanesia and west Polynesia, and the Pomarea monarchs, which are exclusively Polynesian in origin.

The majority of the family is found in forests and woodland habitats. Species that live in more open woodlands tend to live in the higher levels of the trees but, in denser forest, live in the middle and lower levels. Other habitats used by the monarchs include savannahs and mangroves, and the terrestrial magpie-lark occurs in most Australian habitats except the driest deserts.

While the majority of monarchs are resident, a few species are partially migratory and one, the satin flycatcher, is fully migratory, although the Japanese paradise flycatcher is almost entirely migratory. The African paradise flycatcher makes a series of poorly understood intra-African migratory movements.

== Breeding ==
The monarchs are generally monogamous, with the pair bonds ranging from just a single season (as in the African paradise flycatcher) to life (the Elepaio). Only three species are known to engage in cooperative breeding, but many species are as yet unstudied. They are generally territorial, defending territories that are around 2 ha in size, but a few species may cluster their nesting sites closely together. Nesting sites may also be chosen close to aggressive species. For example, leaden flycatchers' nests may be located near the nests of the aggressive noisy friarbird. The nests are in turn often aggressively defended by monarch species. In all species, the nest is an open cup on a branch, fork, or twig. In some species, the nests can be highly conspicuous.
