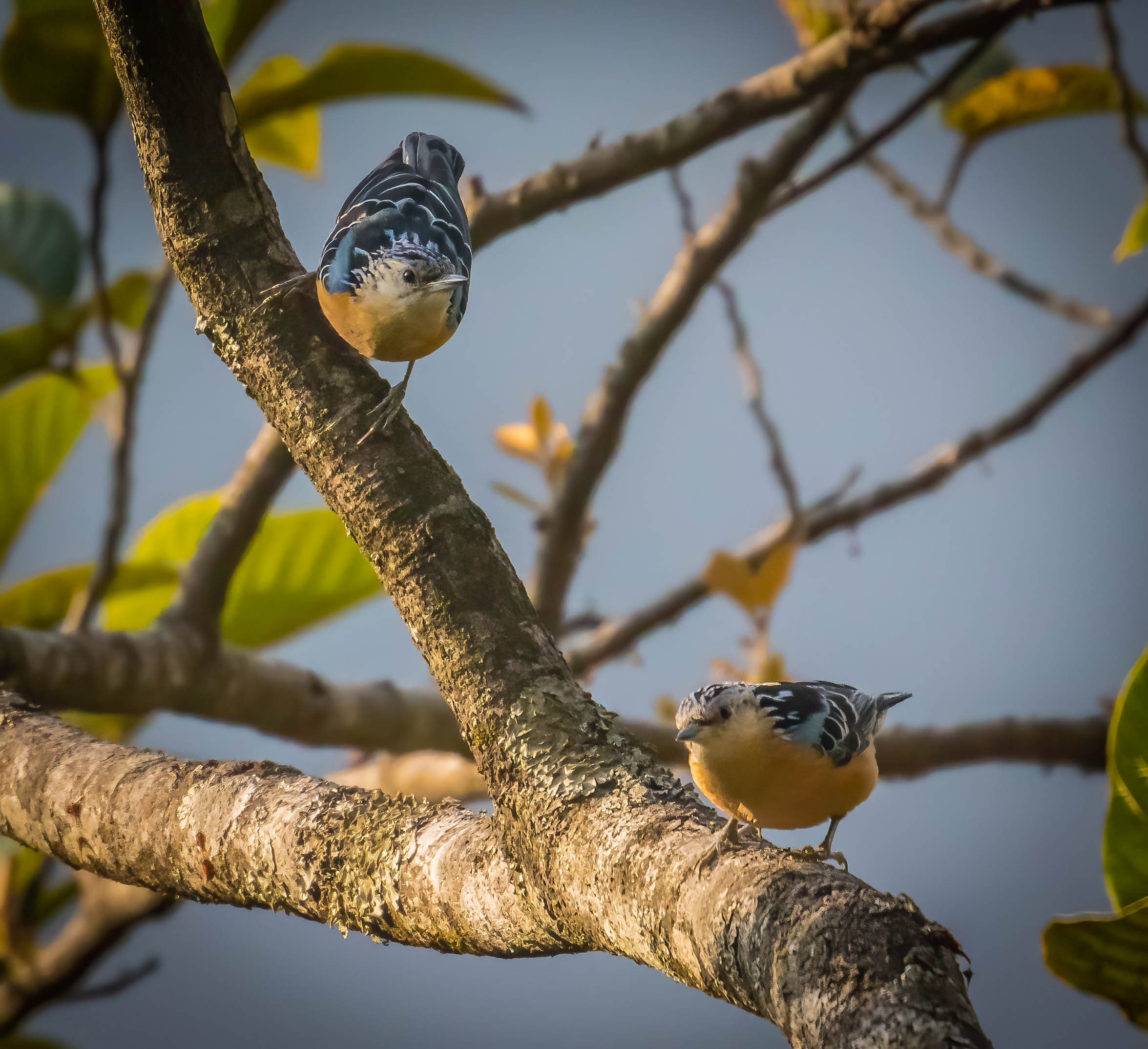
- A pair of beautiful nuthatches in Bhutan

Conservation status
- Vulnerable (IUCN 3.1)

Scientific classification
- Kingdom: Animalia
- Phylum: Chordata
- Class: Aves
- Order: Passeriformes
- Family: Sittidae
- Genus: Sitta
- Species: S. formosa

Binomial name
- Sitta formosa Blyth, 1843
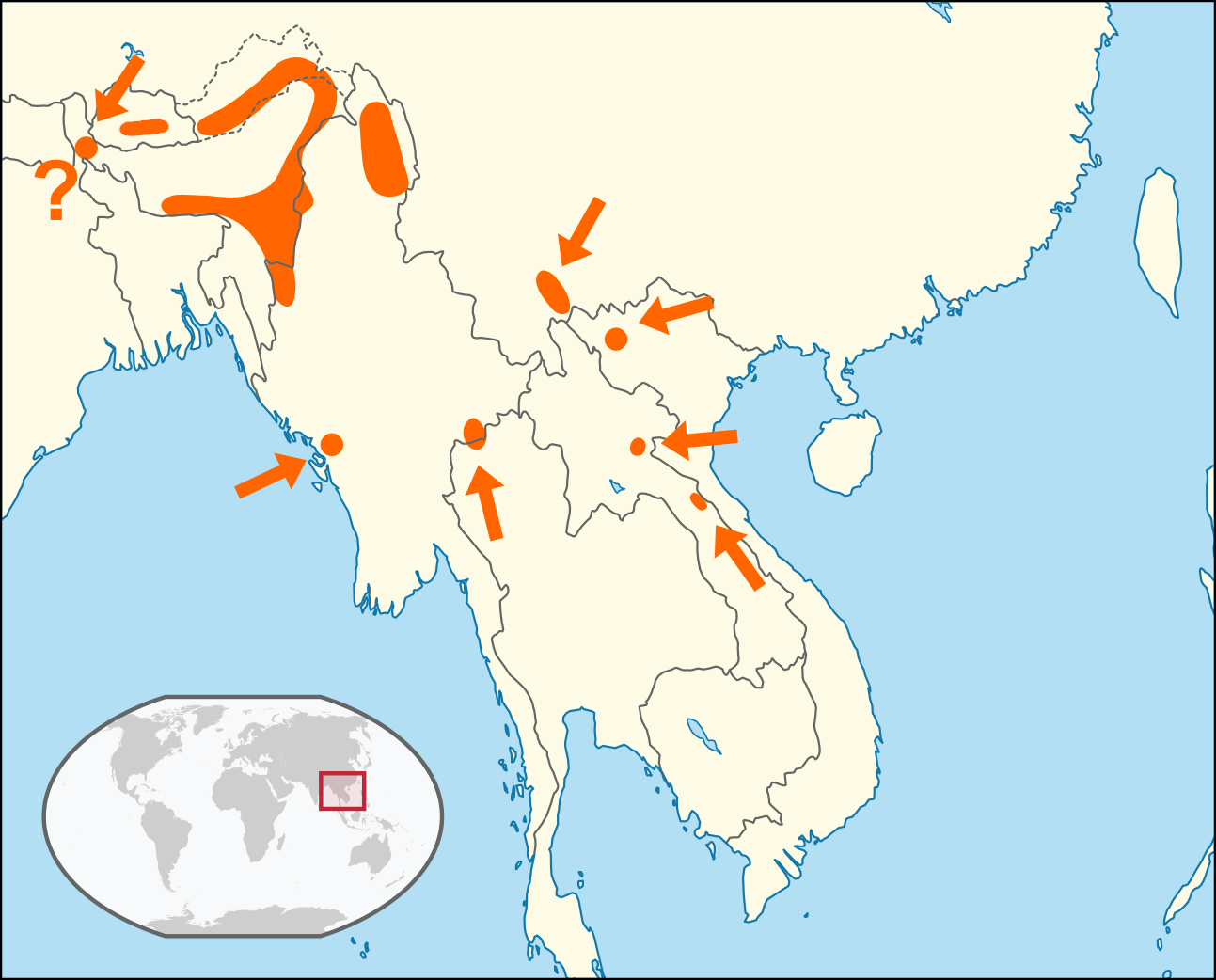

Synonyms
- • Callisitta formosa (Blyth, 1943)

= Beautiful nuthatch =

Species of bird

The beautiful nuthatch (Sitta formosa) is a bird species in the family Sittidae, collectively known as nuthatches. It is a large nuthatch, measuring 16.5 cm (6.5 in) in length, that is not sexually dimorphic. Its colour and markings are dramatic, the upper parts being black and azure, streaked with white and pale blue on the head and lined with the same colours on the wing feathers. The underparts are orange, and the eyebrow and throat are ochre. An irregular, dark eyestripe highlights its eye. Its ecology is not fully described, but it is known to feed on small insects and larvae found on the trunks and epiphyte-covered branches of trees in its range. Reproduction takes place from April to May; the nest is placed in the hole of an oak, rhododendron, or other large tree. The nest is made of plant material and fur in which the bird typically lays four to six eggs.

Although the species is found in most of the countries making up the mainland of Southeast Asia, it appears to be rare throughout its range, its population being highly local where it is found. The bird nests predominantly in montane forest at an altitudinal range from 950 m (3,120 ft) up to nearly 2,300 m (7,500 ft), with some seasonal height adjustment, down to around 300 m (980 ft) in winter. Its localised occurrence within its range makes rigorous estimates of its population difficult, but its habitat is threatened by deforestation and the species appears to be in decline. It has been classified as vulnerable by the International Union for Conservation of Nature.

== Taxonomy ==
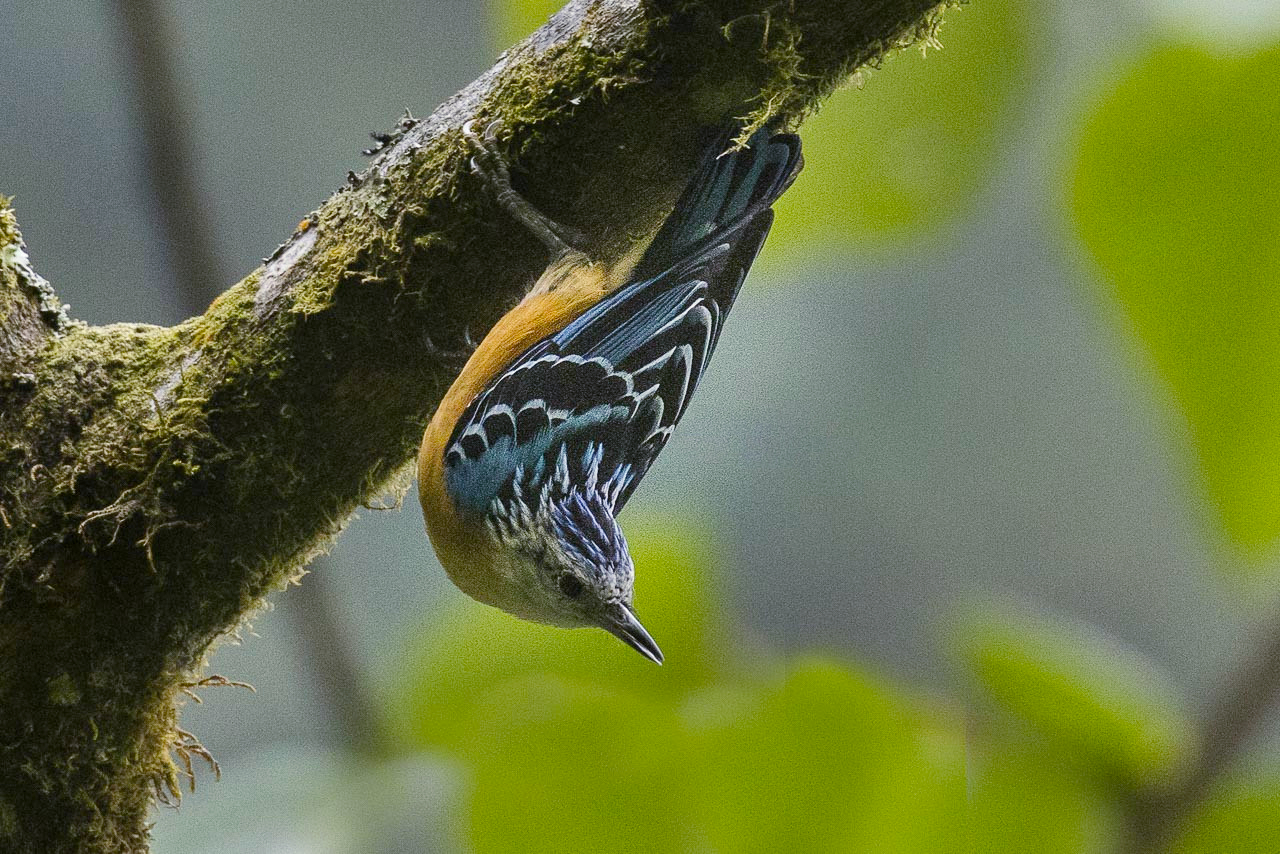
Beautiful nuthatch in Arunachal Pradesh, India

The nuthatches constitute a genus Sitta of small passerine birds in the family Sittidae, typified by short, compressed wings and short, square 12-feathered tails, a compact body, longish pointed bills, strong toes with long claws, and behaviourally, by their unique head-first manner of descending tree trunks. Most nuthatches have grey or bluish upperparts and a black eyestripe. Sitta is derived from the Ancient Greek name for nuthatches, σίττη, sittē. "Nuthatch", first recorded in 1350, is derived from "nut" and a word probably related to "hack", since these birds hack at nuts they have wedged into crevices. The genus may be further divided into seven subgenera, of which the beautiful nuthatch is placed alone in Callisitta (Bonaparte, 1850), and the species was therefore sometimes called Callisitta formosa.

The beautiful nuthatch was first described in 1843 by British zoologist Edward Blyth, from a specimen he examined in Darjeeling. Its kinship with other members of the genus is unclear. The bright blue colour of its plumage invites a comparison to the blue nuthatch (S. azurea), or other blue-tinted nuthatch species such as the velvet-fronted nuthatch (S. frontalis), yellow-billed nuthatch (S. solangiae) and the sulphur-billed nuthatch (S. oenochlamys), but its distribution being focused in the eastern Himalayas, and the uniqueness of its plumage, argues against the assumption. No subspecies have been identified.

Phylogenetic tree detail
Nuthatch phylogenic detail according to Pasquet, et al. (2014):

- Weakly-supported clade
  - Beautiful nuthatch (S. formosa)
      - Eastern rock nuthatch (S. tephronota)
      - Western rock nuthatch (S. neumayer)
        - Kashmir nuthatch (S. cashmirensis)
        - Chestnut-vented nuthatch (S. nagaensis)
        - Eurasian nuthatch (S. europaea)
      - White-tailed nuthatch (S. himalayensis)

In 2014, Eric Pasquet, et al. published a phylogeny based on examination of nuclear and mitochondrial DNA of 21 nuthatch species. The position of the beautiful nuthatch within the genus was not established with certainty, having a far lower statistical association than others in the model. Nevertheless, under the findings the species appears closest evolutionarily to three clades of nuthatches: two nuthatches that prefer rocky environments, the western rock nuthatch (S. neumayer) and the eastern rock nuthatch (S. tephronota); species in the "europaea" group, including the Eurasian nuthatch (S. europaea), Siberian nuthatch (S. arctica), chestnut-vented nuthatch (S. nagaensis), Kashmir nuthatch (S. cashmirensis), Indian nuthatch (S. castanea), chestnut-bellied nuthatch (S. cinnamoventris) and the Burmese nuthatch (S. neglecta); as well as the white-tailed nuthatch (S. himalayensis), and therefore, the white-browed nuthatch (S. victoriae). These close relatives are generally all species that plaster the entrance to their nest with mud.

== Description ==
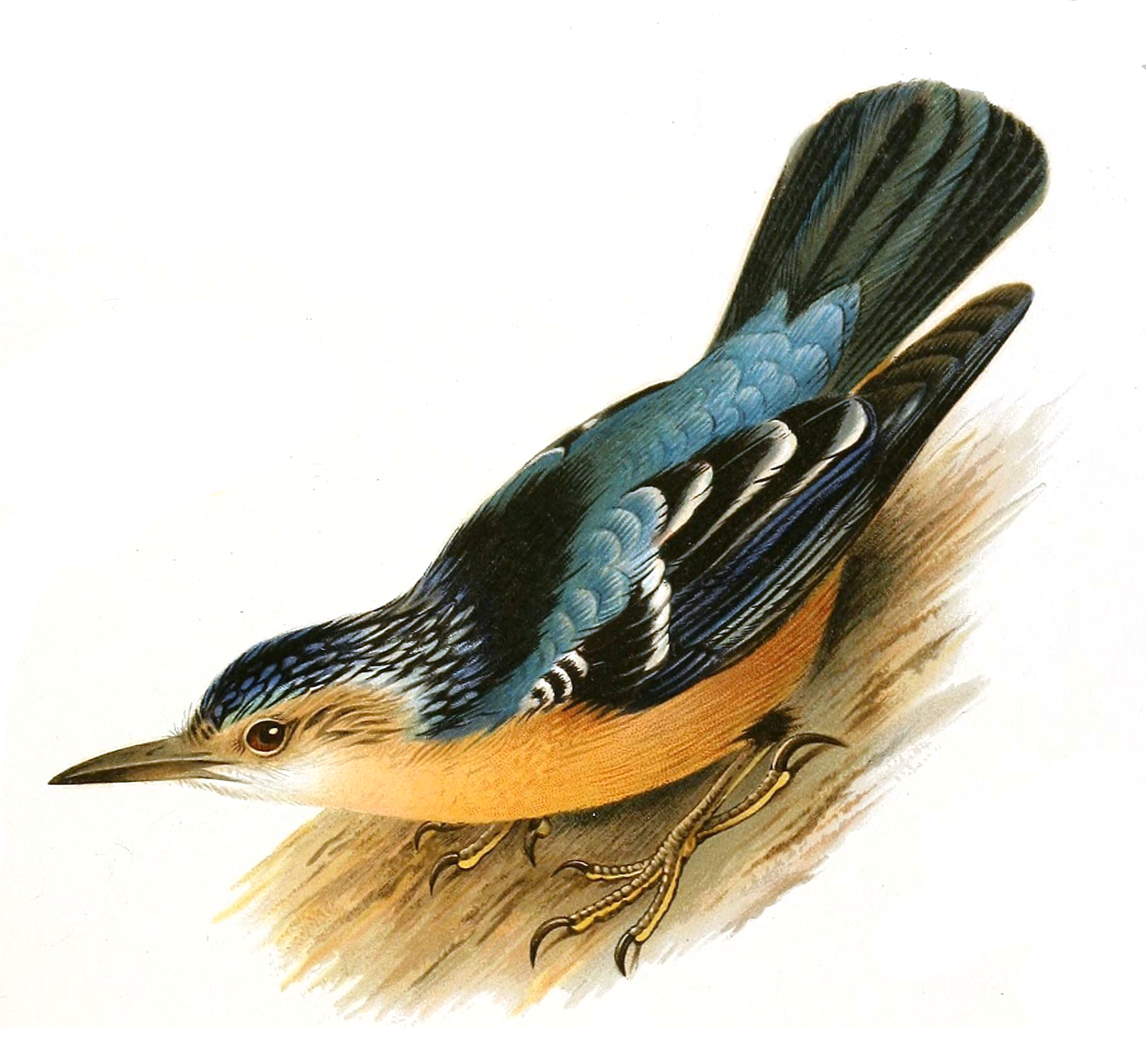
Drawing depicting the main morphological features

Described by Erik Matthysen in his 1998 treatise The Nuthatches as a bird that "deserves its name", the beautiful nuthatch has highly distinctive plumage. Its upperparts are black and azure, and it is orange on the underparts. The crown and upper mantle are black, streaked with pale blue and white. The scapulars, back and rump are an azure blue. The greater and medium coverts are black, finely edged with white, forming two narrow wing bars; the flight feathers are black and more or less lined with pale blue. The eyebrow and throat are white and buff and the eye is highlighted by an irregular, dark eyestripe. Under the wing, the white base of the primary coverts contrasts sharply with grey undertail-coverts; a distinguishing trait when viewing the bird in flight. The iris is reddish-brown or dark brown and the bill is black but for a whitish tinge at the base of the lower mandible. The lower parts are generally orange-cinnamon. The legs and feet are yellowish-brown, olive-brown or greenish-brown.

There is no sexual dimorphism. Juveniles are very similar to adults, but the streaks on the mantle are blue rather than white. The primary coverts of juveniles are also more closely lined with blue, and the underparts are paler overall, especially on the chest. Adults perform a complete moult after the breeding season, whereas juveniles only have a partial moult, in which they replace a variable number of rectrices.

The bird is large as compared with other members of the genus Sitta, measuring 16.5 cm (6.5 in) in length. The folded wing measures 98–109 mm (3.9–4.3 in) in males and 97–100 mm (3.8–3.9 in) in females. The tail is 48–60 mm (1.9–2.4 in) in males and 52–56 mm (2.0–2.2 in) in females. The beak measures between 20 mm (0.79 in) and 24.9 mm (0.98 in) and the tarsus is 19–22 mm (0.75–0.87 in) in length. The weight is not known.

== Ecology and behaviour ==
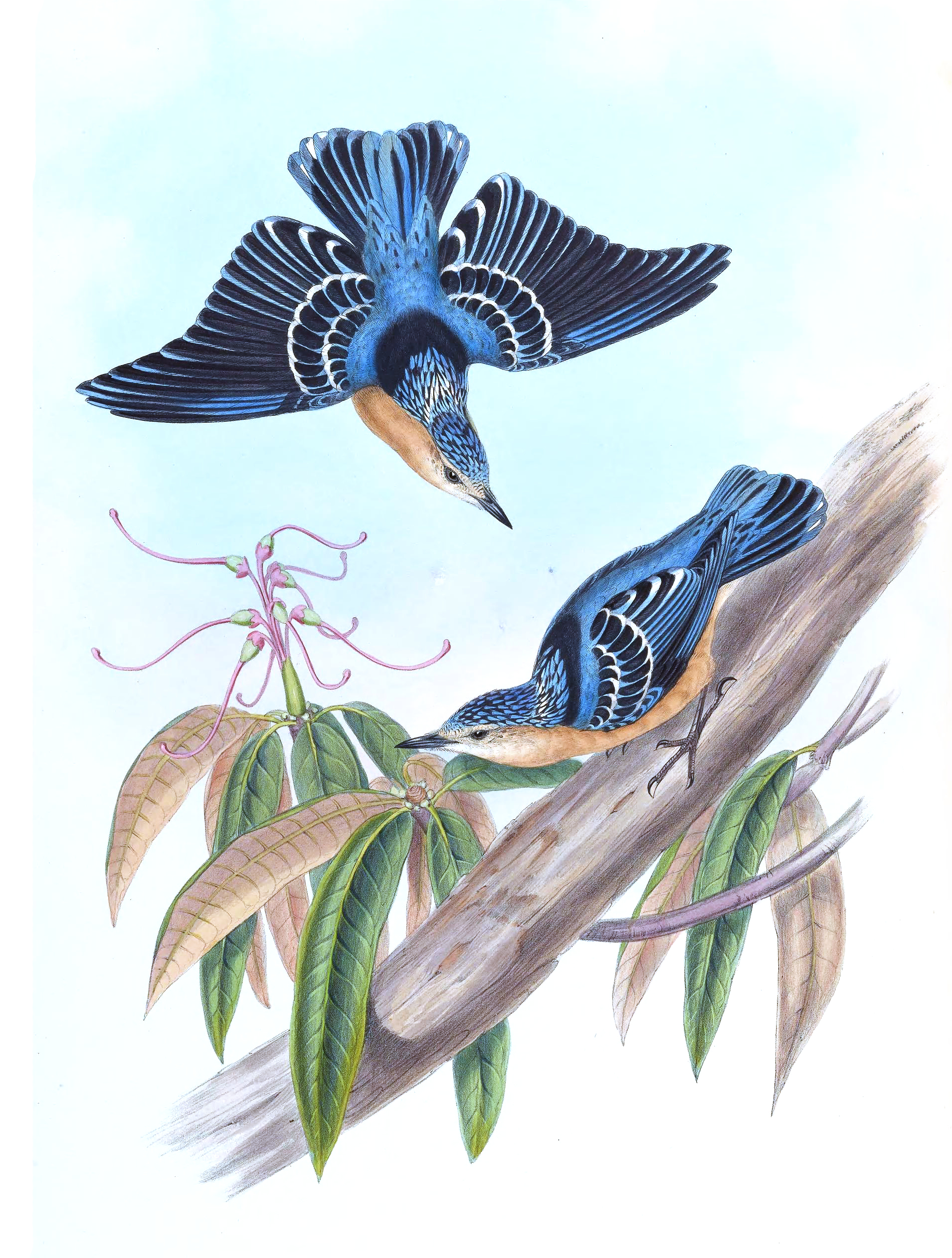
Illustration of Sitta formosa, by John Gould and H. C. Richter.

=== Voice ===
The calls and song are not well known, but its song is described as "low and sweet in tone". Its call is typical of nuthatches, and similar to that of the Eurasian nuthatch (Sitta europaea), but less strident.

=== Feeding ===
The beautiful nuthatch forages alone, in pairs or in small groups of four to five individuals, though an unusual gathering of 21 individuals was observed in one tree in Bhutan. It often takes part in mixed-species foraging flocks, and has been notably observed feeding with the Himalayan cutia (Cutia nipalensis) and the velvet-fronted nuthatch (Sitta frontalis) – two other species that prospect for food on tree trunks. Other foraging flock partners surveyed are the long-tailed broadbill (Psarisomus dalhousiae), the lesser racket-tailed drongo (Dicrurus remifer), the maroon oriole (Oriolus traillii) and the white-browed scimitar babbler (Pomatorhinus schisticeps).

S. formosa forages from about the middle to the apex of tall trees, exploring the trunks and epiphyte-covered branches (lichens, mosses, orchids), for small insects, but also prospect on outermost branches. In Laos, individuals were observed feeding while perched on the larger branches of a Fujian cypress (Chamaecyparis hodginsii), a tree frequently enveloped in epiphytes. The bird has been described at times as the most timid of nuthatches. It prospects in a manner typical of many others in its genus, sometimes hanging upside down for an extended time surveying its surroundings. As compared with other nuthatch, the species has been described as working "unhurriedly", as they peck at trunks, lichen and other epiphytes, searching for prey. Stomach contents of collected Chinese specimens consisted of beetles and insect larvae.

=== Breeding ===
Reproduction in the species has not been well studied. In the northeast of India, the breeding season is from April to May. The nest is placed off the ground, between two and eight meters high, and is often built in a hole of a (living or dead) oak or rhododendron tree, or sometimes in other large trees. The nests are constructed using leaves and bark, held together with hair, often that of bamboo rats. If the opening of the hole is too large, it is cemented with mud to reduce the entrance size. The bird usually lays four to six white eggs, speckled with red spots, that measure 20.8 mm × 15.3 mm (0.82 in × 0.60 in). Beautiful nuthatch sexes are reported to share equally in nest building and incubation duties.

== Distribution and habitat ==
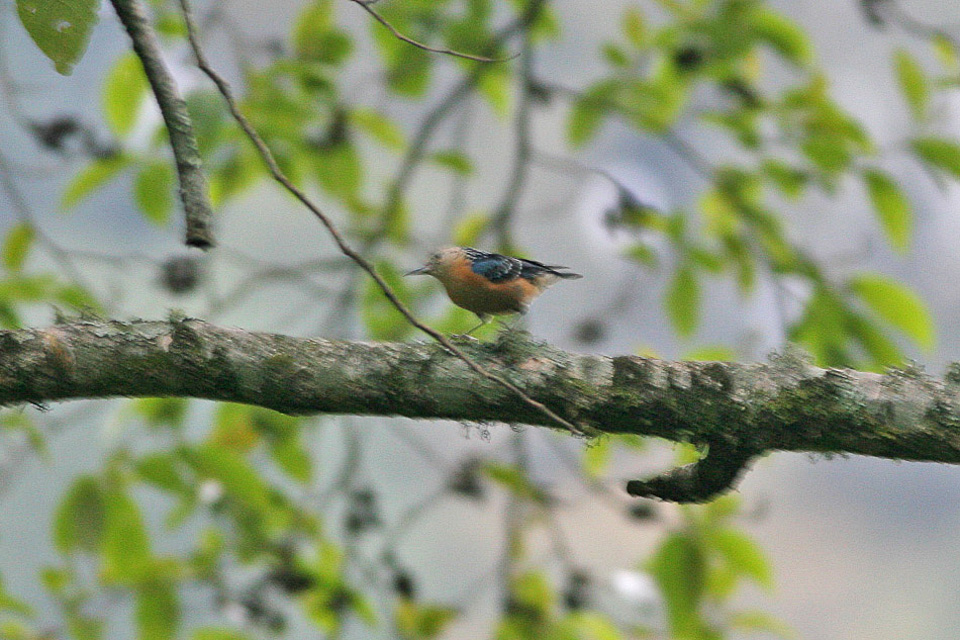
In natural habitat in Bhutan

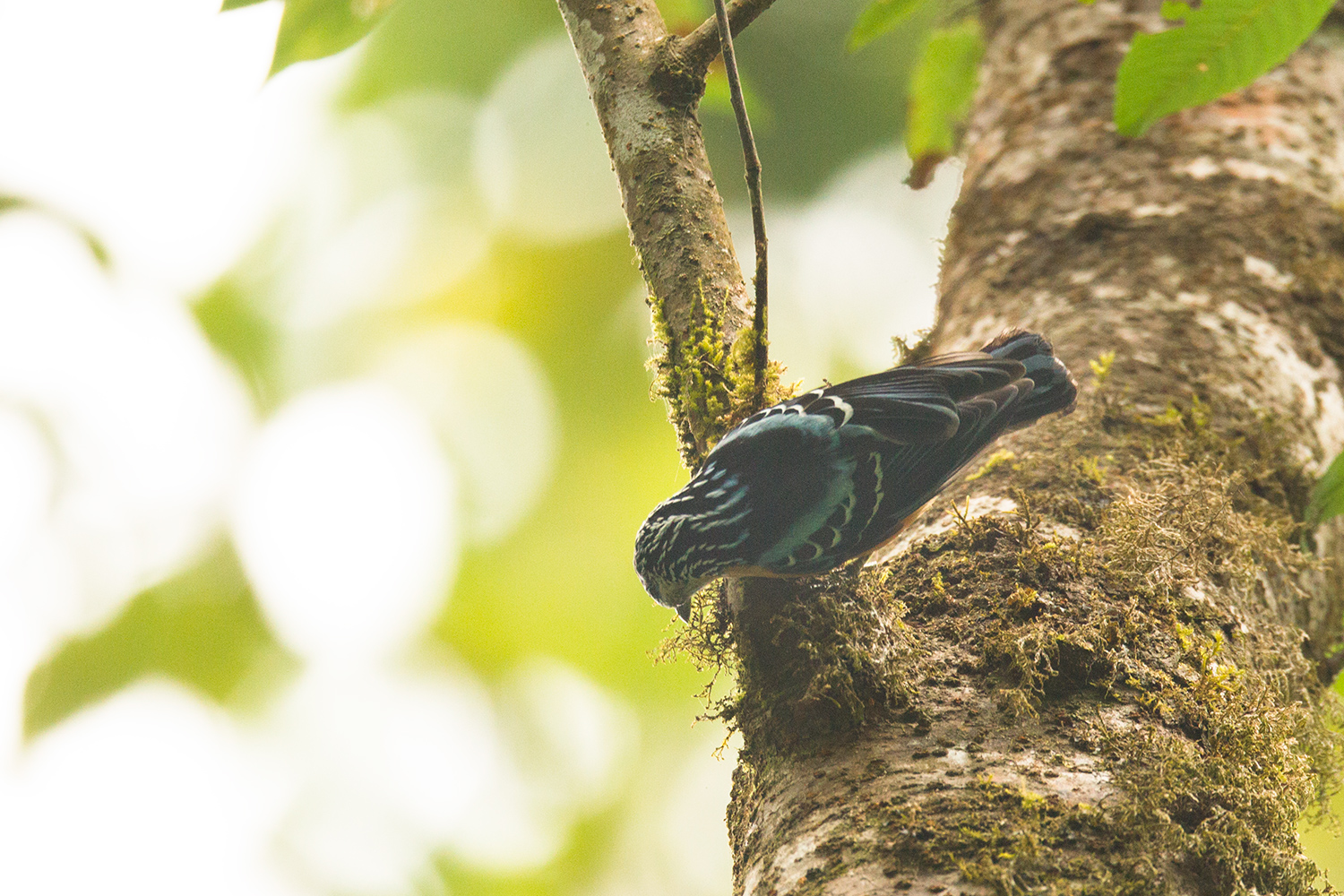
A beautiful nuthatch at Eagle Nest sanctuary, India.

This species lives in the eastern Himalayas, and has been reported in several scattered sites across Southeast Asia, in the northwest of Vietnam and in central Laos. Its range stretches west into the northeast of India, where it was reported seen near Darjeeling in West Bengal, but not since 1933. It is present in Bhutan, and in the Indian states of Sikkim (in the town of Rangpo), in Meghalaya (in the Khasi Hills), in Assam (in the Dima Hasao district), in the south of Arunachal Pradesh, and in Manipur and Nagaland. Its presence in Bangladesh is uncertain but it is found further east in the north of Burma, in Chin State (in the Chin Hills–Arakan Yoma montane forests), the Sagaing Region, in Kachin State and in Shan State. Data on the bird from Laos is erratic, but there are reports of sightings north of Phou Kobo, and of large numbers of the species wintering in the center of the country in the pristine wilderness of Nakai–Nam Theun. There are also reports of sightings in the southeast of China's Yunnan province, in northern Thailand and in northwestern Vietnam. Its residential and breeding range is estimated to cover 376,000 km^{2} (145,000 sq mi).

Beautiful nuthatches typically inhabit both the interior and outskirts of evergreen or semi-evergreen montane forest, though in northern Burma they have been recorded nesting in trees scattered across open areas. In central Laos, the bird was found associated with the Fokienia evergreen. They usually live at altitudes of 950 m (3,120 ft) and up to nearly 2,300 m (7,500 ft) during the warm seasons but may make seasonal vertical migration. In India, for example, the species spends the summer between 1,500 m (4,900 ft) and 2,100 m (6,900 ft), but was observed during winter at just 335 m (1,099 ft) in Sikkim and in northeastern Arunachal Pradesh at 460 m (1,510 ft) and between 600 m (2,000 ft) and 800 m (2,600 ft). In Burma, they were observed at between 975 m (3,199 ft) and 1,830 m (6,000 ft), in China between 350 m (1,150 ft) and 1,975 m (6,480 ft), in Laos between 1,950 m (6,400 ft) and 2,000 m (6,600 ft) and in Thailand, the only observation of the species was at a height of 2,290 m (7,510 ft).

== Threats and protection ==
The beautiful nuthatch has always been rare and very local throughout its distribution, perhaps due to very specific ecological requirements, though this has been questioned as not in keeping with the diversity of habitats in which S. formosa has been observed. Although the species is less threatened at high elevations, its habitat has been reduced by deforestation, due to logging and forest clearance to make way for human habitation. In the center of Laos and northern Vietnam, Fokienia trees, which are a known beautiful nuthatch foraging source and nesting site, are harvested for their high commercial value. Research conducted in 2001 indicated a population comprising 2,500 to 10,000 adults, and between 3,500 and 15,000 total individuals; these numbers are in decline. The species has been classified as vulnerable by the International Union for Conservation of Nature (IUCN).

== Footnotes ==
1. Being Callisitta, Poecilositta, Oenositta, Sitta, Mesositta, Micrositta and Leptositta.
2. The 21 species are out of 24 accepted as making up the genus by Harrap and Quinn as of 1996. Of these, the study omitted the Indian nuthatch (Sitta castanea), the yellow-billed nuthatch (Sitta solangiae) and the white-browed nuthatch (Sitta victoriae). The International Ornithological Congress however accepts 28 species as of 2012, based on the elevation of four taxa from subspecies to full species status, including Przevalski's nuthatch (S. przewalskii) and three species from the europaea group.
3. For comparison, the smallest nuthatches, the brown-headed nuthatch (Sitta pusilla) of North America, and its related Asian counterpart, the pygmy nuthatch (Sitta pygmaea) measure, respectively, 105 mm (4.1 in) and 110 mm (4.3 in), while the giant nuthatch, the largest of the genus, measures 19.5 cm (7.7 in).

== Bibliography ==
- Harrap, Simon (1996). Christopher Helm (ed.). Tits, Nuthatches and Treecreepers. Illustrated by David Quinn. A&C Black. ISBN 978-0-7136-3964-3.
- Matthysen, Erik (2010) [1998]. The Nuthatches. Illustrated by David Quinn. A & C Black. ISBN 978-1-4081-2870-1.
