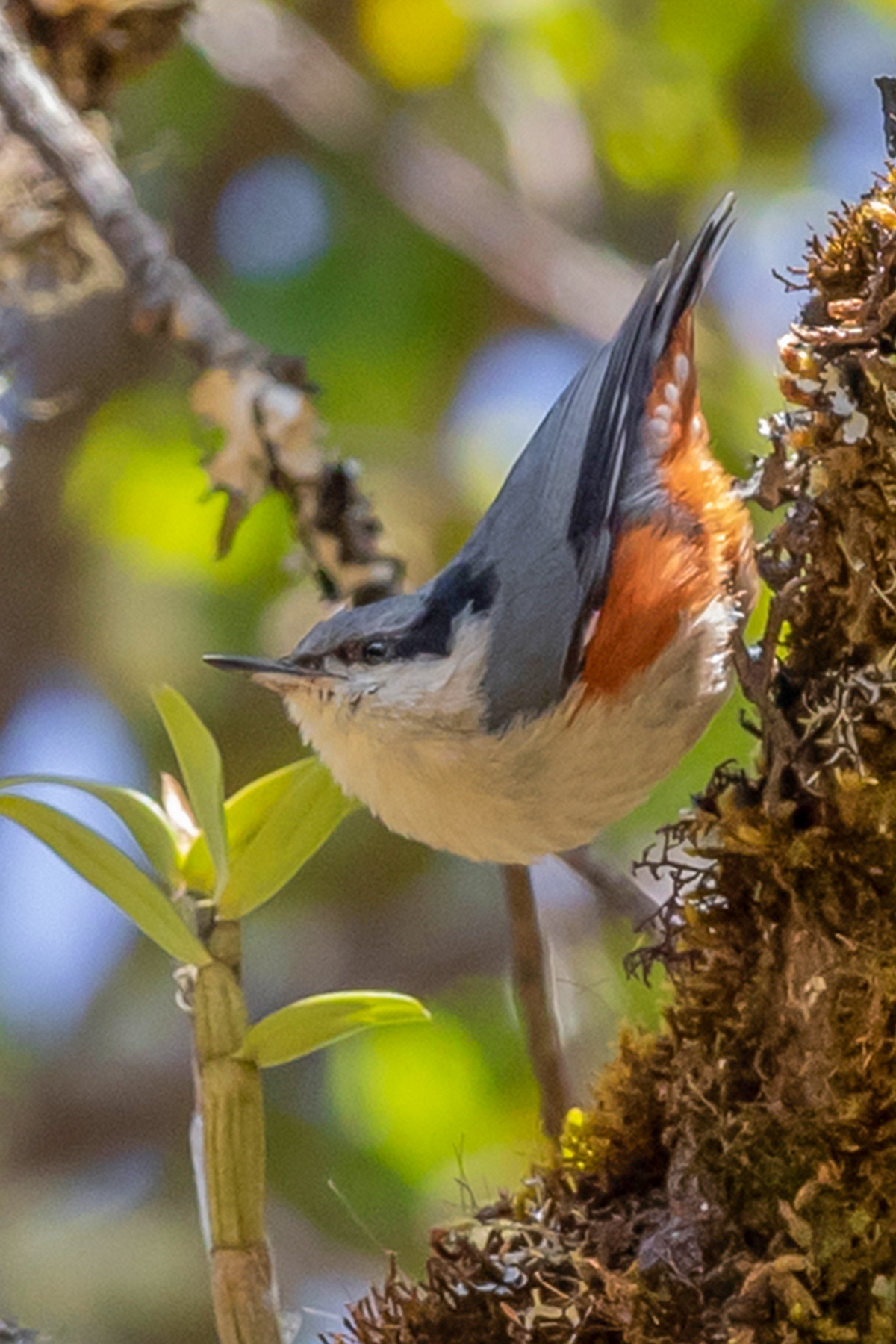
- Subspecies S. n. grisiventris on Nat Ma Taung (Mount Victoria), Myanmar.

Conservation status
- Least Concern (IUCN 3.1)

Scientific classification
- Kingdom: Animalia
- Phylum: Chordata
- Class: Aves
- Order: Passeriformes
- Family: Sittidae
- Genus: Sitta
- Species: S. nagaensis

Binomial name
- Sitta nagaensis Godwin-Austen, 1874
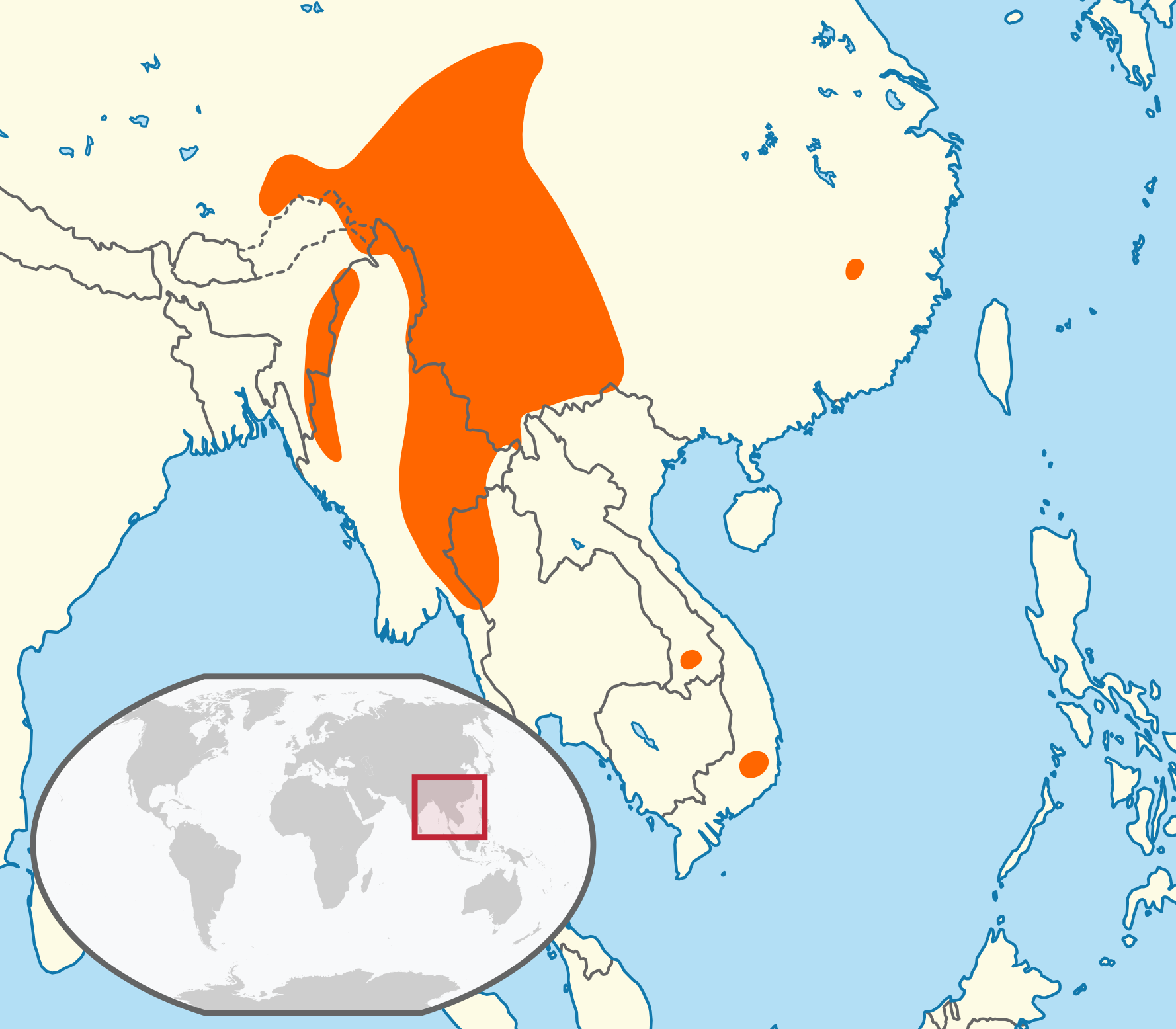
- Range of the chestnut-vented nuthatch

Synonyms
- Sitta europaea obscura (La Touche, 1921); Sitta europaea nebulosa (La Touche, 1922); Sitta europaea tibetosinensis (Kleinschmidt & Weigold, 1922); Sitta europaea delacouri (Deignan, 1938); Sitta europaea kongboensis (Kinnear, 1940)

= Chestnut-vented nuthatch =

Species of bird

The chestnut-vented nuthatch (Sitta nagaensis) is a species of bird in the nuthatch family Sittidae. It is a medium-sized nuthatch, measuring 12.5–14 cm (4.9–5.5 in) in length. The upperparts are a solid grey-blue, with a markedly black loral stripe. The underparts are uniform grey to buff from the throat to belly, with brick red on the flanks. The undertail is white with a rufous border. The chestnut-vented nuthatch utters different kinds of calls, which can sometimes sound like a wren alarm, and its song is a monotonous, stereotypical crackle, typically chichichichi. Its ecology is poorly known, but it probably feeds on small arthropods and seeds, and the breeding season begins between March and May. The nest is typically located in a hole in the trunk of a tree, and the clutch has two to five eggs.

Chestnut-vented nuthatches are found in the northeast of India, in parts of Tibet and south-central China, descending into eastern Myanmar and northwestern Thailand. Isolated populations also live in southern Laos and Vietnam. It mainly lives in evergreen forests or pine forests, but can also live in mixed or deciduous forests. Its natural habitats are subtropical or tropical moist lowland forests and subtropical or tropical moist montane forests. Its altitudinal distribution varies according to the localities, but ranges from 915–4,570 m (3,002–14,993 ft). The species was described in 1874 by the British naturalist Henry Haversham Godwin-Austen, who named it Sitta nagaensis after the Naga Hills, where the type material was collected. It belongs to the S. europaea group of species, including the Kashmir nuthatch (S. cashmirensis) and the Eurasian nuthatch (S. europaea), all of which build mud entrances to their nests. The species' population is not known but appears to be declining. However, the bird's range is relatively wide, and the International Union for the Conservation of Nature currently considers the species of least concern.

== Taxonomy ==
The chestnut-vented nuthatch was described as Sitta nagaensis in 1874 by the British naturalist Henry Haversham Godwin-Austen. Its species name is composed of naga and the Latin suffix -ensis, "that lives in, that inhabits", and was given in reference to the area when the type of the species was collected, the Naga Hills. The chestnut-vented nuthatch is placed in the nominate subgenus Sitta (Linnaeus, 1758).

In 2014, Eric Pasquet and colleagues published a phylogeny based on examination of nuclear and mitochondrial DNA of 21 nuthatch species. The europaea group is related to the two nuthatches that live in rocky environments, the western rock nuthatch (S. neumayer) and the eastern rock nuthatch (S. tephronota). Within the europaea group, the white-tailed nuthatch (S. himalayensis) and therefore probably the white-browed nuthatch (S. victoriae), which closely resembles it in terms of its morphology, although it was not included in the study, appear to be basal, and the chestnut-vented nuthatch is closely related to the Eurasian nuthatch (S. europaea) and the Kashmir nuthatch (S. cashmirensis).

Phylogenetic relationship of chestnut-vented nuthatch with other nuthatches

- - Beautiful nuthatch (S. formosa)
  - - - Eastern rock nuthatch (S. tephronota)
      - Western rock nuthatch (S. neumayer)
    - - White-tailed nuthatch (S. himalayensis)
      - - Kashmir nuthatch (S. cashmirensis)
        - Chestnut-vented nuthatch (S. nagaensis)
        - Eurasian nuthatch (S. europaea)

Nuthatch relationships according to Pasquet, et al. (2014).

- - - Western rock nuthatch (Sitta neumayer)
    - Eastern rock nuthatch (Sitta tephronota)
  - - Siberian nuthatch (Sitta arctica)
    - - - White-browed nuthatch (Sitta victoriae)
        - White-tailed nuthatch (Sitta himalayensis)
      - - Eurasian nuthatch (Sitta europaea)
        - - Chestnut-vented nuthatch (Sitta nagaensis)
          - - Kashmir nuthatch (Sitta cashmirensis)
            - - Indian nuthatch (Sitta castanea)
              - - Chestnut-bellied nuthatch (Sitta cinnamoventris)
                - Burmese nuthatch (Sitta neglecta)

Nuthatch relationships according to Päckert et al. (2020).

=== Subspecies ===
There are three accepted subspecies of the chestnut-vented nuthatch.

- S. n. montium (La Touche, 1899), described by the Irish ornithologist John La Touche (with the protonym Sitta montium) as a montane taxon altitudinally separated from S. europaea sinensis, it occurs in eastern Tibet, southern and eastern China, Myanmar, and northwest Thailand.
- S. n. nagaensis (Godwin-Austen, 1874), occurs in the Naga Hills in northeastern India and northwestern Myanmar.
- S. n. grisiventris (Kinnear, 1920), described from Mount Victoria in western Myanmar, under the protonym Sitta europaea grisiventris (since S. n. nagaesis was also then considered a subspecies of the Eurasian nuthatch S. europaea); birds from southern Vietnam are also currently ascribed to this subspecies.

The subspecies S. n. montium was considered to possibly be the result of hybridisation between chestnut-vented nuthatch and the Chinese subspecies of Eurasian nuthatch Sitta europaea sinensis, or at least to be able to interbreed with it. This is possibly due to the fact that the type series of S. e. sinensis was composite and included a specimen of the chestnut-vented nuthatch. For these reasons, Jean-François Voisin and colleagues designated a lectotype in 2002 for the name Sitta sinensis (Verreaux, 1871). The attribution of the populations of western Myanmar and southern Indochina to the same subspecies S. n. grisiventris, with S. n. montium in central Myanmar between these populations seems untenable, and their taxonomy has yet to be verified.

== Description ==
=== Plumage and measurements ===
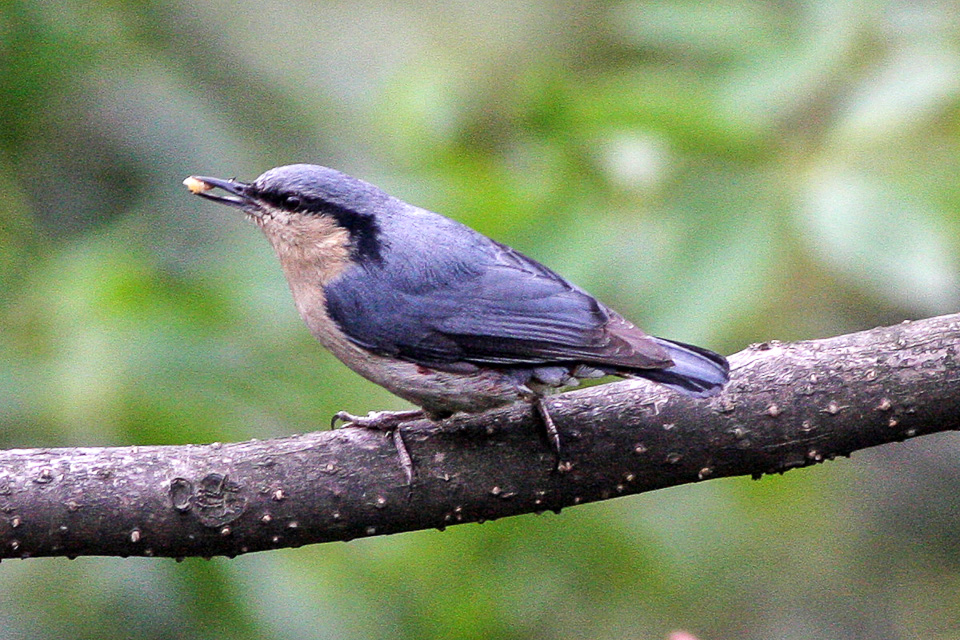
S. n. montium on Wawu Mountain, Hongya County, Sichuan, China

The chestnut-vented nuthatch is a medium-sized nuthatch, measuring 12.5–14 cm (4.9–5.5 in) in length. The upperparts are a solid blue-grey from crown to tail, with a marked black loral line extending to the base of the wing. The underparts are pale grey, more or less tinted buff-tinged depending on the subspecies or the wear of the plumage; the dark brick-red back flanks contrast strongly with the rest of the underparts. The undertail coverts, which may be of the same colour depending on the subspecies, have a large white border at the end of the feathers or a white patch near the tip.

The species does not show marked sexual dimorphism. The male's rear flanks are deep brick-red, deeper and less orange than the undertail coverts, whereas the female's flanks are rufous, concolorous with the undertail coverts. Females also have duller underparts, and juveniles are more buff than adults with worn plumage. The iris is brown to dark brown, the bill is greyish-black to blackish with the base of the lower mandible (and sometimes the base of the upper) slate-grey or blue-grey. The legs are dark brown, greenish or blue-grey, with almost black claws.

Three subspecies are accepted, but variation is essentially clinal, with Chinese populations (S. n. montium) having buff underparts, which get duller and purer grey as they move southward in the species' distribution. In Northeast India and western Myanmar, S. n. nagaensis in fresh plumage is as buff as S. n. montium in worn plumage. In southern Vietnam and southwestern Myanmar, S. n. grisiventris has purer grey underparts than S. n. nagaensis. Adults undergo a complete moult after the breeding season, from May to June, and an incomplete moult occurs before it.

=== Similar species ===
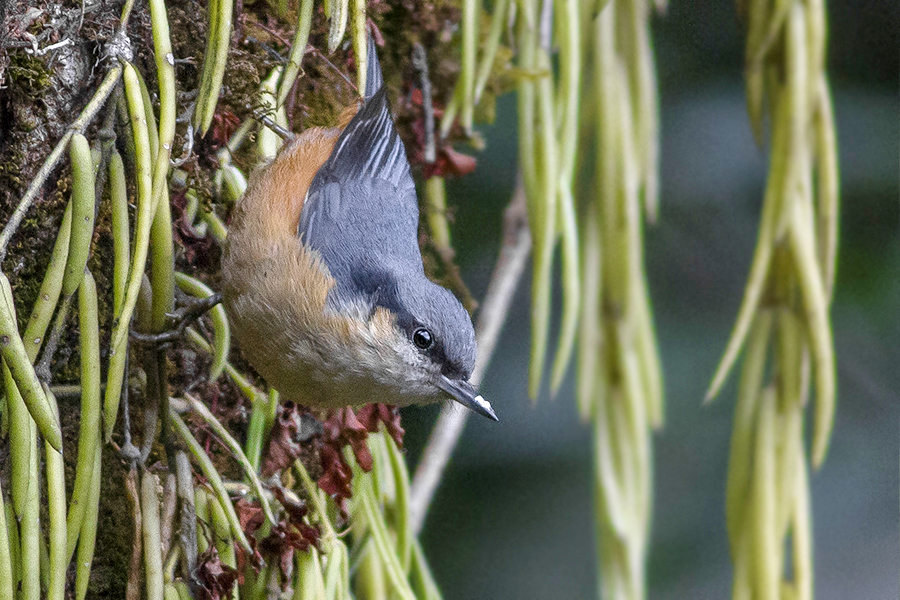
The white-tailed nuthatch (S. himalayensis) has uniform underparts and is much more colourful than the chestnut-vented nuthatch.

The range of the chestnut-vented nuthatch overlaps with that of the Burmese nuthatch (S. neglecta). However, the chestnut-vented nuthatch is easily distinguished by the colour of its underparts, and the lack of contrast between the sides of the head and the throat, whereas the other species has white chins, cheeks, and parotid region contrasting with brick-red to orange-brown underparts. However, in the chestnut-vented nuthatch, some individuals in fresh plumage (especially in S. n. montium) may have underparts almost as buff as some Burmese nuthatch females or juveniles. The chestnut-vented nuthatch can then be recognised by its darker, duller blue upperparts, by its red flanks contrasting with the buff, and by its undertail, with feathers edged with red giving a "scales" pattern, when they appear almost uniformly white in the Burmese nuthatch.

The subspecies S. n. montium can also be confused with the subspecies S. e. sinensis of the Eurasian nuthatch (S. europaea) where they coexist in Sichuan and Fujian. As the latter subspecies has more orange underparts, some Eurasian females may be difficult to differentiate from chestnut-vented nuthatches in fresh plumage. The two species can be distinguished by their vocalisations, with chestnut-vented nuthatch lacking the characteristic singing dwip of the Euraisan nuthatch. Hybrids between these two taxa have been suggested, with montane populations of S. e. sinensis being, like the chestnut-vented nuthatch, greyer on the underside, darker above, and larger than lowland individuals. The chestnut-vented nuthatch, however, is even greyer, and does not have the whitish cheeks of the Eurasian nuthatch.

In southwest China, the chestnut-vented nuthatch lives within the range of the Yunnan nuthatch (S. yunnanensis). However, the latter is smaller, has a thin white supercilium, and has plain, pale buff underparts with no russet on the flanks. In northeastern India and northwestern Myanmar, the chestnut-vented nuthatch can also be confused with the white-tailed nuthatch (S. himalayensis); both species share similar habitats. The white-tailed nuthatch, however, has a white spot on the top of the middle rectrices, and has more orange underparts, without brick-red flanks or white spots on the undertail. The giant nuthatch (S. magna), whose distribution overlaps with that of the chestnut-vented nuthatch in India, Myanmar, and Thailand, differs from the latter in being much larger in size, having a finer eyestripe, and having a crown that is much lighter than the rest of the mantle.

== Ecology and behaviour ==
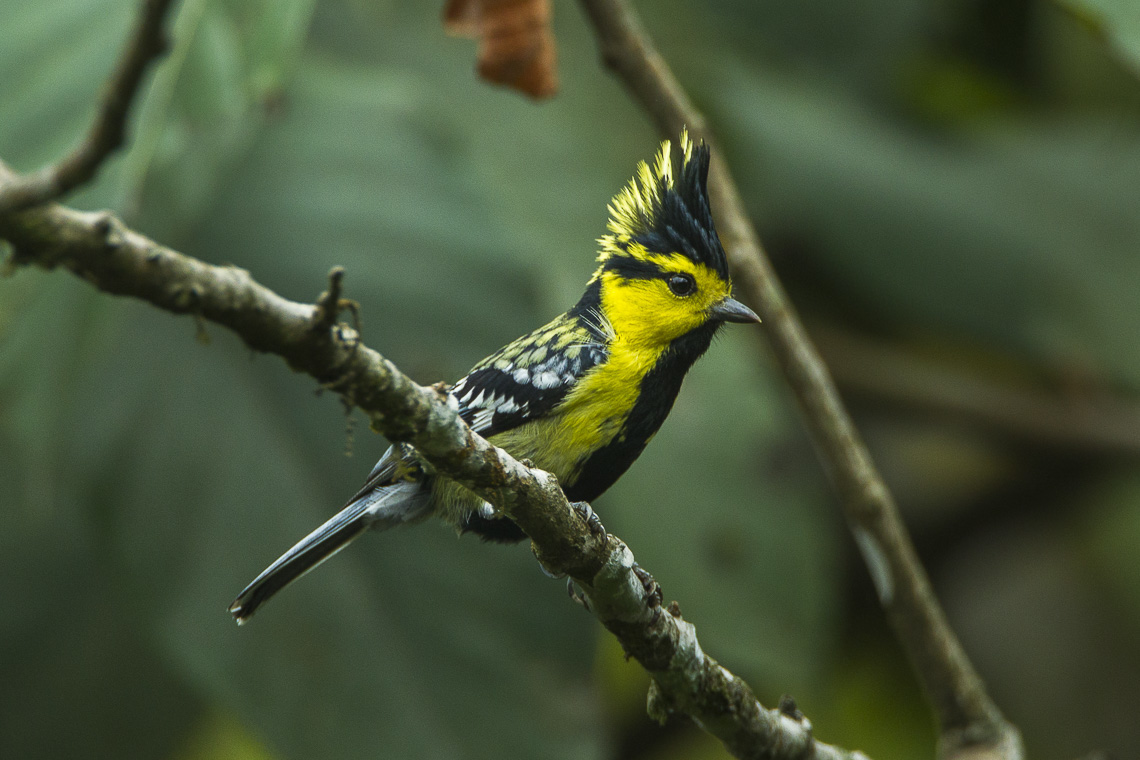
In winter, the yellow-cheeked tit (Machlolophus spilonotus) may roam with the nuthatch in mixed-foraging flocks.

The chestnut-vented nuthatch generally lives alone or in pairs, but joins mixed-species foraging flocks outside of the breeding season. In winter, it can thus be observed in the company of different species of tits (Paridae) such as the yellow-cheeked tit (Maclolophus spilonotus), bushtits, woodpeckers, alcippes, and minlas.

=== Vocalisations ===
The chestnut-vented nuthatch's calls are varied, with squeaky sit or sit-sit sounds, repeated more or less rapidly with various inflections and in irregular series. Similar but drier tchip or tchit sounds are sometimes made, often in a trill reminiscent of the alarm of a Eurasian wren (Troglodytes troglodytes). The alarm calls of the chestnut-vented nuthatch are reported in English-language literature as nasal sounds in quir, kner or mew, as well as an emphatic, metallic tsit, sometimes doubled or repeated in quick series. The song is a stereotyped, monotonous rattle or tremolo in chichichichichi ... or trr-rrrrrrr-ri ..., lasting less than a second or sometimes slowed down to chi-chi-chi-chi-chi ... or diu-diu-diu- diu-diu reminiscent of the song of the Eurasian nuthatch.

=== Food ===
The chestnut-vented nuthatch often forages for food on the ground, on rocks, old stumps, or in trees. No specific information about the diet is known, but the species probably feeds on small arthropods and seeds.

=== Breeding ===
Although the breeding season varies by region, it generally takes place in Thailand from March to May, March to June for India, April to early June for eastern Myanmar, and April to May in Fujian. On Nat Ma Taung, juveniles have been observed as early as March 31. According to observations made in Thailand and Vietnam, the construction of the nest begins in January. It is located at a height of about 10 m (390 in) in the hole of a tree, or in a stump.

The chestnut-vented nuthatch, like the Eurasian nuthatch and other species of the family, may line the entrance of a cavity with mud to reduce the opening and thus avoid predation of the brood. The bottom of the nest is lined with pieces of bark and moss and topped with hair. Two to five eggs are laid, averaging 18.6 mm × 13.8 mm (0.73 in × 0.54 in) in S. n. nagaensis and 18.3 mm × 14 mm (0.72 in × 0.55 in) in S. n. montium. They are white, with red dots on a mottled reddish-purple background, the red dots mainly concentrated at the larger end of the egg.

== Distribution and habitat ==
The chestnut-vented nuthatch lives from Tibet to the mountains of Lâm Đồng province in southern Vietnam. In India, it is found only in the far eastern states of Arunachal Pradesh, Nagaland, Manipur, Assam and Meghalaya. The species lives in the Chin Hills of western Myanmar, but most of its distribution in Myanmar is in the eastern half of the country, from Kachin State to at least Shan State, and also into northwestern Thailand. It also nests in Tibet and south-central China, from western Sichuan to Yunnan and marginally in southwestern Guizhou. An isolated Chinese population also lives in northwestern Fujian, on Mount Huanggang. Two other isolated populations from the southernmost part of the species' distribution, one occurring in southern Vietnam on the Đà Lạt Plateau, another being reported in Laos on the Bolaven Plateau.

The chestnut-vented nuthatch usually inhabits evergreen forests of the uplands, or forests and pine patches growing on dry ridges in the middle of evergreen forests. Locally, it also occurs in deciduous forests in northeastern India, in Quercus subsericea oak forests and alder groves in northeastern Myanmar, spruce forests (Picea sp.), fir forests (Abies sp.) or rhododendron stands in Yunnan, or poplar (Populus sp.) and walnut (Juglans sp.) in Sichuan. The altitudinal distribution ranges from 1,400–2,600 m (4,600–8,500 ft) in India, Thailand, and Myanmar, occasionally occurring up to 3,200 m (10,500 ft) in the latter. It also occurs from 1,050–3,500 m (3,440–11,480 ft) in Tibet and Sichuan and up to 4,570 m (15,000 ft) in Yunnan. The population in southern Vietnam lives between 915–2,285 m (3,002–7,497 ft).

== Status and threats ==
The population of the chestnut-vented nuthatch is declining due to habitat destruction and fragmentation, but its range is large and was estimated to be 3.8 million km^{2} (1.5 million square miles), and the species is generally common throughout its range. For these reasons, the chestnut-vented nuthatch is considered to be of least concern by the International Union for the Conservation of Nature. A study carried out in 2009 tried to predict the impact of climate change on the distribution of several species of nuthatches in Asia by modeling two scenarios. It predicted that the chestnut-vented nuthatch could see its distribution decrease between the 2040s and 2069 by 15.9 to 17.4%.

== Footnotes ==
The 21 species are out of 24 species accepted as making up the genus by Simon Harrap and David Quinn as of 1996. Of these, the study omitted the Indian nuthatch (Sitta castanea), the yellow-billed nuthatch (Sitta solangiae) and the white-browed nuthatch (Sitta victoriae). The International Ornithological Congress however accepted 28 species in 2012, based on the elevation of four taxa from subspecies to full-species status, including Przevalski's nuthatch (S. przewalskii) and three species from the europaea group.
