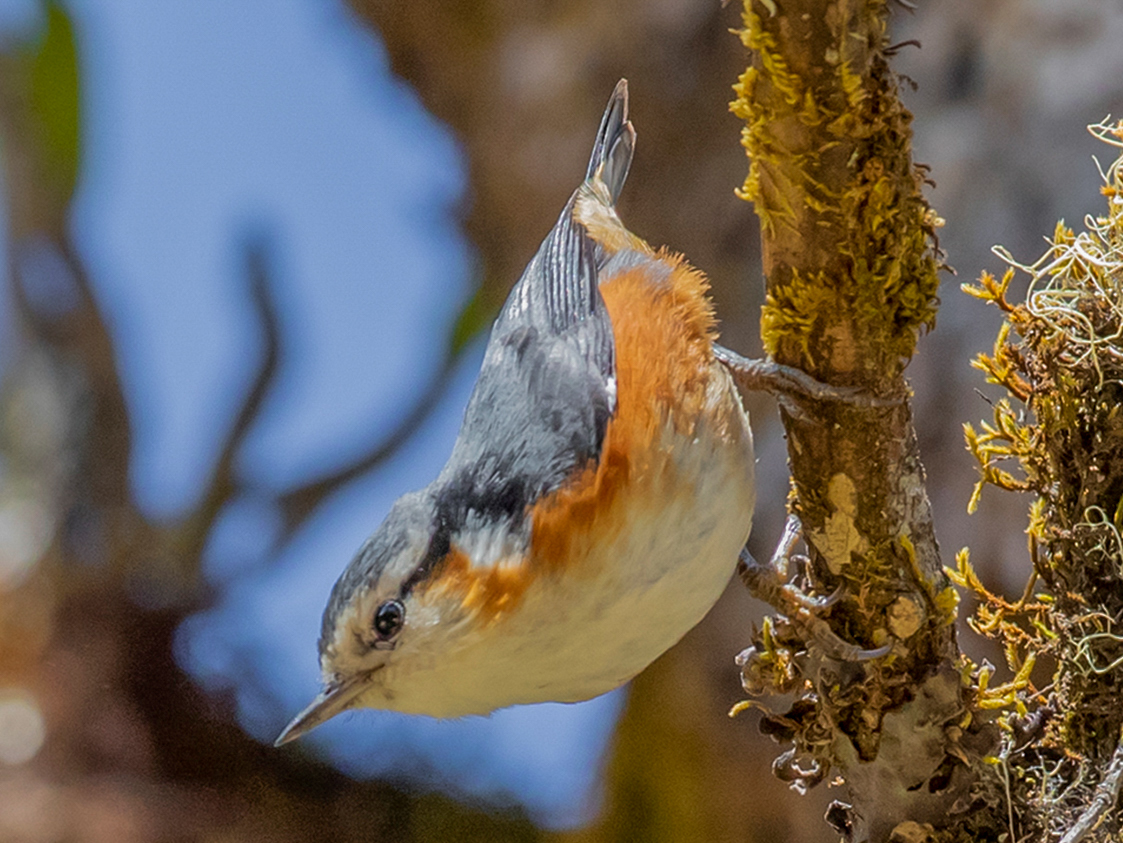

Conservation status
- Endangered (IUCN 3.1)

Scientific classification
- Kingdom: Animalia
- Phylum: Chordata
- Class: Aves
- Order: Passeriformes
- Family: Sittidae
- Genus: Sitta
- Species: S. victoriae

Binomial name
- Sitta victoriae Rippon, 1904
- White-browed nuthatch range

Synonyms
- Sitta himalayensis victoriae (Rippon, 1904)

= White-browed nuthatch =

Species of bird

The white-browed nuthatch (Sitta victoriae), also known as the Victoria nuthatch, is a species of bird in the family Sittidae. It is a small nuthatch, measuring 11.5 cm (4.5 in) in length and without sexual dimorphism. Like many other nuthatches, the upperparts are greyish blue, contrasting with white underparts on the throat, cheeks, and breast and orange on the flanks, belly, and lower abdomen. Its white supercilium makes it easy to distinguish it from the white-tailed nuthatch (S. himalayensis), which is a close species in the systematic and geographical sense. Little is known about its ecology, but it feeds on small insects found among bark and lichens, and breeding occurs around April.

The white-browed nuthatch is endemic to Nat Ma Taung, also known as Mount Victoria, in the southern Chin Hills of Myanmar. It inhabits old oak groves at high elevations, generally above 2,600 m (8,500 ft). The population poorly known but is estimated to be a few thousand individuals. It threatened by habitat destruction by fire and human pressure. For these reasons, the International Union for the Conservation of Nature considers the bird to be an "endangered species."

== Taxonomy ==
The white-browed nuthatch was described in 1904 under its current binomial name, S. victoriae, by the British ornithologist and Lieutenant-Colonel George Rippon, and the holotype is deposited in the British Museum. British ornithologist Lieutenant H. Wood, who visited Nat Ma Taung, also known as Mount Victoria; thus, the species was called Sitta victoriae, visited nearby during the winter of 1901–1921, and was the first to explore the Chin hills ornithologically. Rippon then spent several months on Nat Ma Taung in 1904, collecting a large number of specimens in response to Wood's initial findings. It is most likely phylogenetically related to the white-tailed nuthatch (S. himalayensis), prompting Richard Meinertzhagen (in 1927), Ernst Mayr (in 1941), and Charles Vaurie (in 1957) to treat S. victoriae as a subspecies of S. himalayensis. However, Vaurie pointed out that there was no evidence of intergradation between the nuthatch from Nat Ma Taung and the nuthatch from the Mizo Hills in the Himalayas, 180 kilometers northeast of Nat Ma Taung. In 1957, British ornithologist Simon Harrap suggested that the small size, solid undertail coverts, and marked white supercilium may indicate close relationships with the Yunnan nuthatch (Sitta yunnanensis). The German ornithologist Hans Edmund Wolters proposed the division of the genus Sitta into subgenera in 1975-1982, with white-browed nuthatch placed in Sitta subgenus Mesositta. According to the International Ornithological Congress and Alan P. Peterson, no subspecies are distinguished.

Päckert and colleagues (2020) studied the complete circum-Tibetan group of nuthatches, which were sister to S. himalayensis and S. victoriae. Surprisingly, a deep split between three specimens of S. himalayaensis equaled interspecific divergences among species of clade. Within the Sitta europaea group, the white-tailed nuthatch and white-browed nuthatch are not included in the study, but appear to be basal.

Phylogenetic tree detail
Nuthatch phylogenic detail according to Packert, et al. (2020):

- - White-browed nuthatch (Sitta victoriae)
  - White-tailed nuthatch (Sitta himalayensis)
- - Eurasian nuthatch (Sitta europaea)
  - - Chestnut-vented nuthatch (Sitta nagaensis)
    - - Kashmir nuthatch (Sitta cashmirensis)
      - - Indian nuthatch (Sitta castanea)
        - - Chestnut-bellied nuthatch (Sitta cinnamoventris)
          - Burmese nuthatch (Sitta neglecta)

== Description ==
Comparison of the tail of the white-tailed nuthatch (S. himalayensis), left, and the white-browed nuthatch (S. victoriae), right.

The white-browed nuthatch is a small nuthatch, measuring 11.5 cm (4.5 in) in length. The folded wing measures 68–73 mm (2.7–2.9 in) for the male, 67–69 mm (2.6–2.7 in) for the female. The tail is 36–37 mm (1.4–1.5 in), the beak is 15–16 mm (0.59–0.63 in), and the tarsus is 14–16 mm (0.55–0.63 in). The weight is not known, but the Chinese nuthatch and the red-breasted nuthatch, which are also 11.5 cm (4.5 in) in length, average 11.3 grams (0.40 oz) and 8–12.7 grams (0.28–0.45 oz), respectively.

The upperparts are dull bluish-grey. The underparts are white from the throat and lower chest, but the belly is orange, with the underside and undertail light red and the flanks darker. It has a white forehead, eyebrows, and lore, and a black line at the back of the eye, thickening backwards on the nape. The cheeks are as white as the throat but the back of the cheek is orange, with a white patch on the parotic coverts. No sexual dimorphism was found, and the juveniles could be distinguished by the lighter orange-red flanks. The bill is black at the tip and slate grey otherwise; the culmen and lower mandible are iris red-brown or dark brown, paler. The thighs are grey, and the legs are dull, yellowish-brown, or olive-brown.

The white-browed nuthatch can be confused with the white-tailed nuthatch, which can inhabit the same areas but which is rare where white-browed nuthatch lives. Adults in their fresh plumage have a narrow whitish supercilium extending to the back of the ear-coverts. The central tail feathers of white-browed nuthatch are light grey at the tip and have white over most of their base, which is distinctive from the white-tailed nuthatch in which the white is relatively sparse. It has a narrow black eyestripe that becomes much wider on the upper mantle. The white-browed nuthatch can also be recognized by its white eyebrows and forehead and the strong contrast between the white of the breast and the dark red flanks. Finally, the beak is shorter and thinner.

== Ecology and behaviour ==
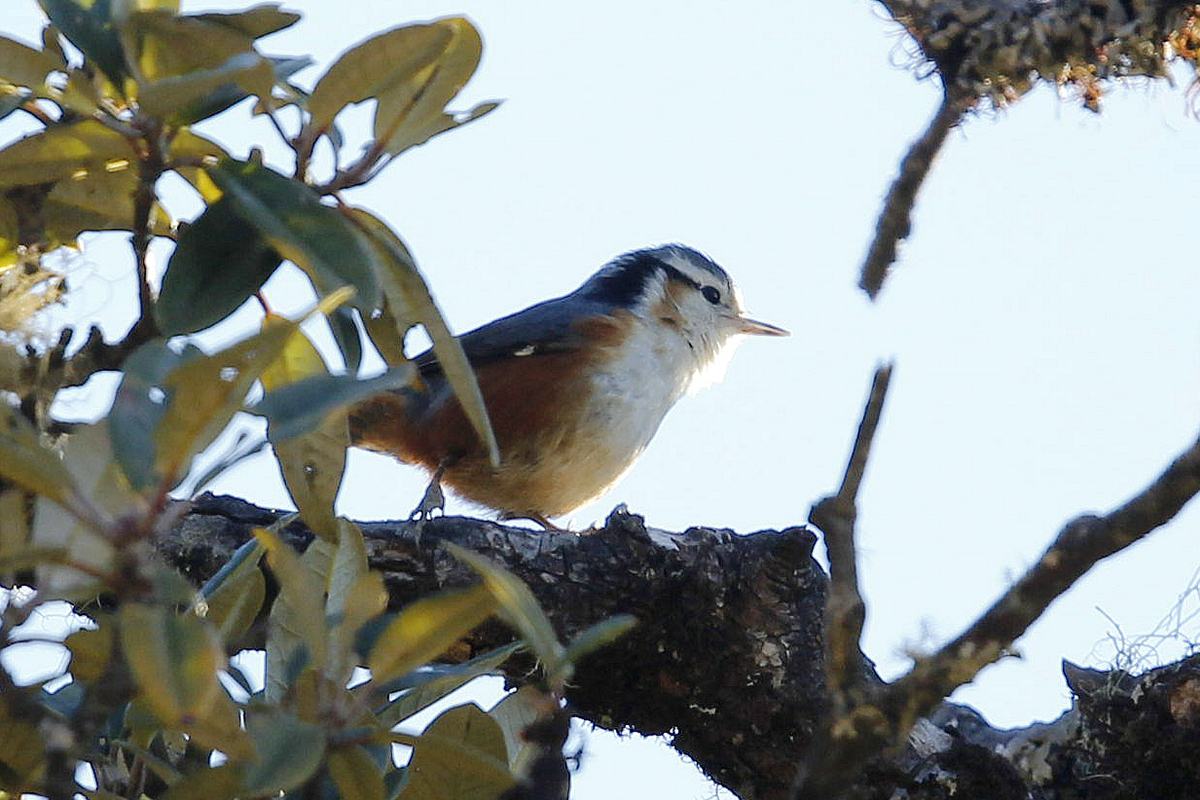
White-browed nuthatch on a tree branch.

=== Vocalizations ===
The call is produced at irregular intervals, and consists of a simple pit or plit. The white-browed nuthatch also emits an insistent pii, pii, pii... with 2.5 to 3.5 notes per second, produced more or less regularly. Harrap reports a possible song, consisting of 9 to 12 units at 9 notes per second and consisting of a whi-whi-whi... The classical song is a slow and soft trill composed of tuwi couplets emitted at the rate of 4 couplets per second, and produced in a stanza of 1.5 seconds rising in intensity tuwi-tuwi-tuwi-tuwi-tuwi-tuwit.

=== Food ===
The nuthatch is usually seen alone or in pairs. It feeds on small insects which it usually finds in the epiphytes growing on the oaks, or in hollows in the bark. It generally explores the outer branches, but can also prospect on the branches more inside the tree or on the trunk. The plant species prospected are Quercus semecarpifolia half the time, but Rhododendron arboreum is also exploited, as well as, to a lesser extent, Lyonia ovalifolia, Lithocarpus dealbatus, Pinus kesiya, and Alnus nepalensis.

=== Breeding ===
Very little is known about its reproduction. Myanmar ornithologist Thet Zaw Naing observed three nests between mid-March and early April in 2002. Two of the nests were located in the cavity of an internal branch in a Quercus semecarpifolia, 4 m (13 ft) and 10 m (33 ft) high; the third was placed in the trunk of a Rhododendron arboreum, 6 m (20 ft) high. The first nest cited was dug by the female alone, and its entrance was not walled up with clay, unlike what several other nuthatch species do. Only females seem to feed the young. In April, three flocks were observed, each with two fledged young.

== Distribution and habitat ==
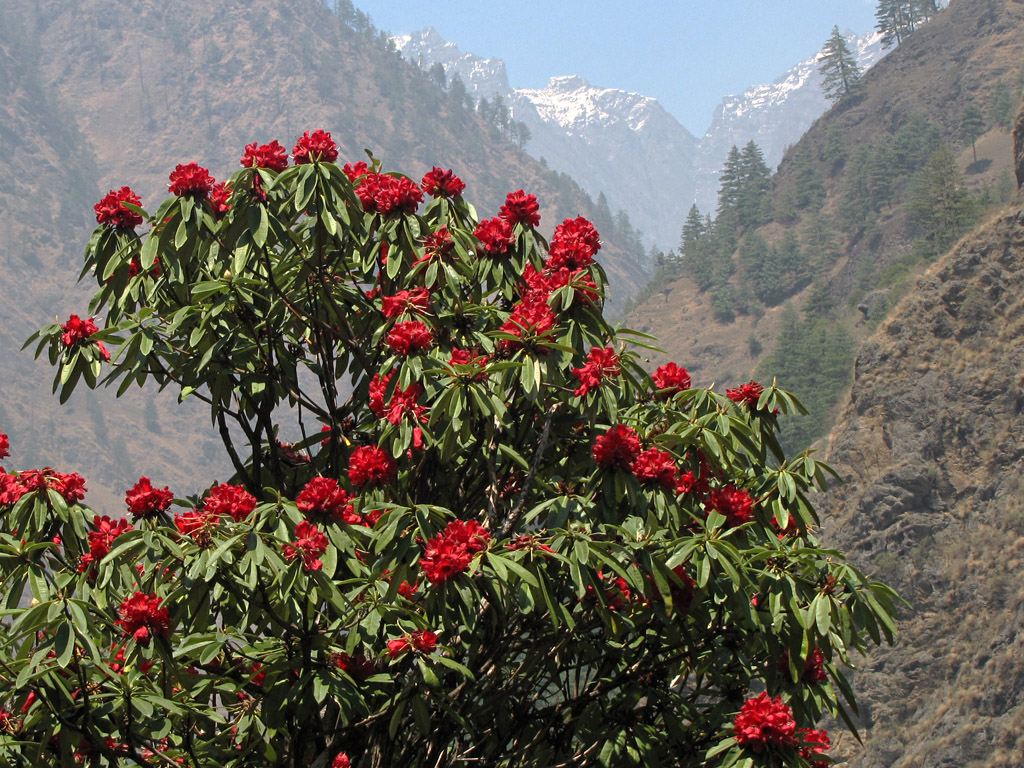
Rhododendron arboreum can be visited by the nuthatch, both for food and for nesting.

The white-browed nuthatch is endemic to western Myanmar. It is currently found on Nat Ma Taung in the southern part of the Chin Hills, at nearly 3,070 m (10,070 ft), and 22 km (14 mi) further northwest in the spring of 1995 near Mindat.

The white-browed nuthatch avoids the pure pine forests of Pinus kesiya and is found instead in lichen-covered old oak forests of the alpine level. Thus, it was observed at an altitude of over 2,600 m (8,500 ft) in 1940 and over 2,700 m (8,900 ft) in the spring of 1995. However, during the description of the species in 1904, Rippon reported that he collected six birds between 2,285–2,745 m (7,497–9,006 ft) altitude from 22 March to 30 April; there could therefore be seasonal altitudinal dispersion, with the birds leaving the higher altitudes during winter.

The white-browed nuthatch habitat consists mainly of Quercus semecarpifolia oaks, covered with epiphytic plants, lichens, mosses, orchids, and ferns.

== Status and threats ==
The white-browed nuthatch is one of four endemic bird species in Myanmar, the others being the hooded treepie (Crypsirina cucullata), Burmese bush lark (Mirafra microptera) and white-throated babbler (Turdoides gularis). The counts of the species mentioned in the literature are very patchy: 14 birds were observed in 1995, then five over two weeks in April 2000, and 45 during four months of fieldwork in 2001-2003. In 2007, surveys in the Chin Hills did not find any observations of this nuthatch, suggesting that the species is strictly endemic in the Nat Ma Taung region. These observations, combined with density and distribution data, indicate a population of 2,500 to 10,000 mature individuals, for a total of 3,500 to 15,000 individuals.

On Nat Ma Taung, the forest has been completely cleared up to 2,000 m (6,600 ft), and the remaining habitats at 2,000–2,500 m (6,600–8,200 ft) are severely degraded. Nearly 12,000 people live in Natmataung National Park, and trapping and fires are adding to the threats to the species. The population, estimated at a few thousand individuals, is declining. The species is legally protected by a 1994 Myanmar law (Protection of Wildlife and Conservation of Natural Areas Law), but no protective measures are implemented, including discouraging the destruction of its habitat. The range is estimated at 820 km^{2} (320 sq mi) by BirdLife International. For these reasons, the species is considered endangered by the International Union for the Conservation of Nature.
