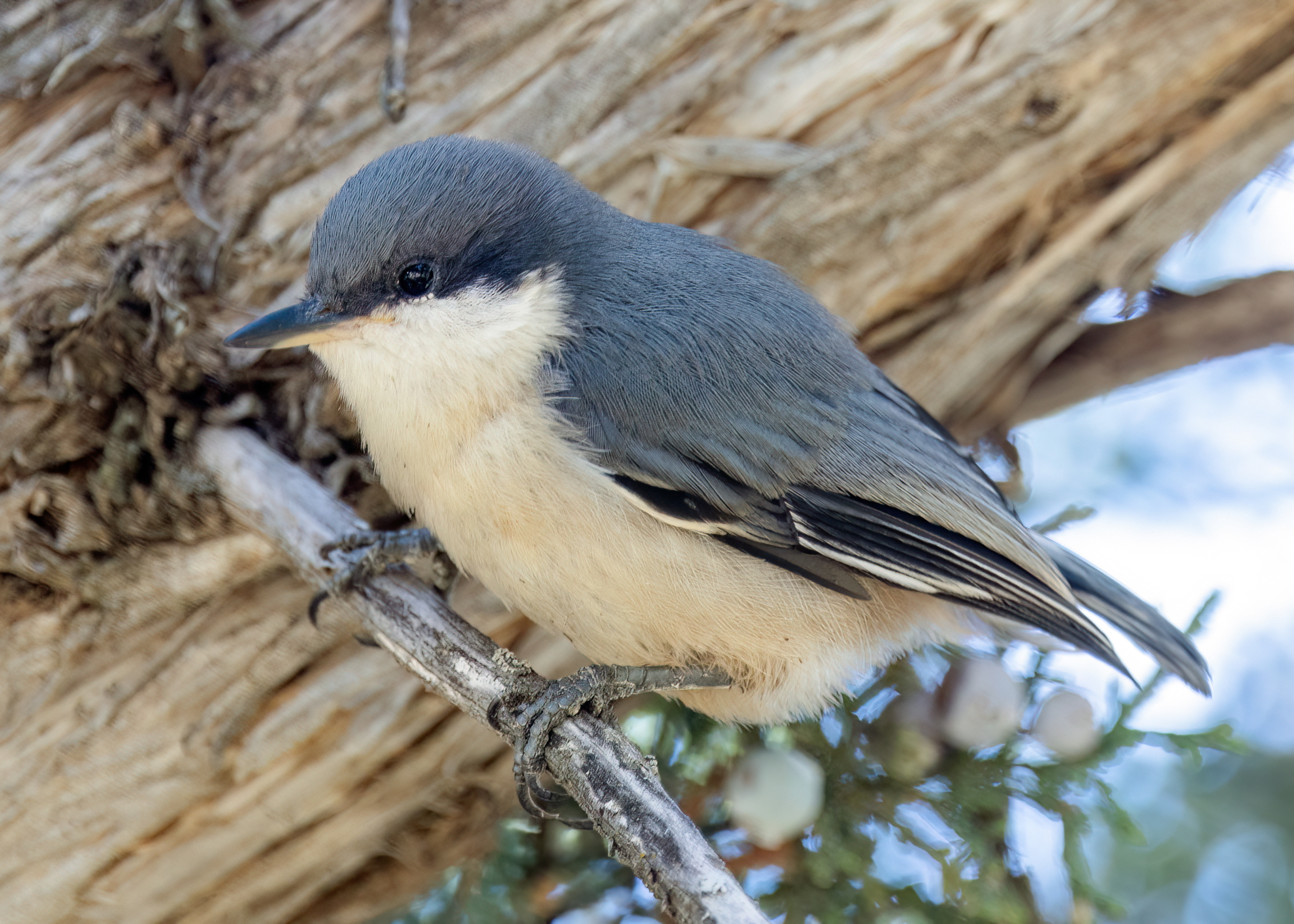
- Pygmy Nuthatch at Grand Canyon National Park

Conservation status
- Least Concern (IUCN 3.1)

Scientific classification
- Kingdom: Animalia
- Phylum: Chordata
- Class: Aves
- Order: Passeriformes
- Family: Sittidae
- Genus: Sitta
- Species: S. pygmaea

Binomial name
- Sitta pygmaea Vigors, 1839

= Pygmy nuthatch =

Species of bird

The pygmy nuthatch (Sitta pygmaea) is a tiny songbird, native to western North America.

== Description ==
The pygmy nuthatch is 9–11 cm (3.5–4.3 in) long and with a wingspan of 19.7 cm (7.8 in), and weighs 9.3–11.4 g (0.33–0.40 oz).

It ranges from southern British Columbia south through various discontinuous parts of the western U.S. (northwest U.S., Sierra Nevada range, southern Rockies, etc.), to central Mexico. It is usually found in pines (especially ponderosa pine), douglas-fir, and other conifers. Pygmy nuthatches clamber acrobatically in the foliage of these trees, feeding on insects and seeds; less often they creep along limbs or the trunk like bigger nuthatches.

Pygmy nuthatches nest in cavities in dead stubs of conifers, lining the bottom of the cavity with pine cone scales, plant fibers, and other soft plant and animal materials. They may fill cracks or crevices around the entrance with fur; the function of this behavior is unknown. The female lays 4–9 eggs, which are white with fine reddish-brown spotting. She does most of the incubation, which lasts about 16 days. The young leave the nest about 22 days after hatching.

This species is highly gregarious. A nesting pair may have other birds as helpers. Outside the breeding season, they wander in noisy flocks. It also roosts communally; over 100 birds have been seen huddled in a single tree cavity.

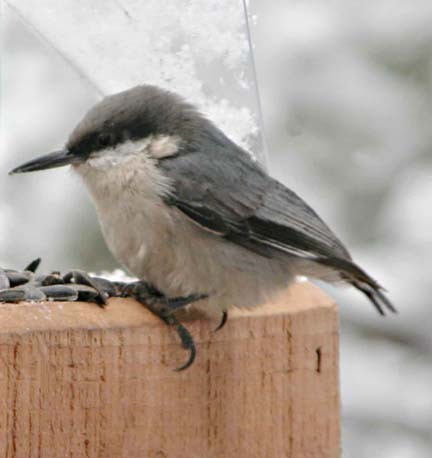
At a feeder

All plumages are similar, with a warm gray cap, blue-gray upper-parts, and whitish underparts. There is a whitish spot on the nape, particularly in worn plumage (summer). In flight, it shows a white subterminal band on the tail. The vocalizations are highly varied chirps, peeps, and chattering.

Six subspecies are currently accepted; some older texts accept a seventh, S. p. chihuahuae.

- Sitta pygmaea melanotis Van Rossem, AJ, 1929. Southwestern Canada south through interior western USA to northwestern Mexico; syn. S. p. chihuahuae van Rossem, 1929.
- Sitta pygmaea pygmaea Vigors, NA, 1839. Central California coast.
- Sitta pygmaea leuconucha Anthony, AW, 1889. Southwestern California coast.
- Sitta pygmaea brunnescens Norris, RA, 1958. Southwestern Mexico.
- Sitta pygmaea flavinucha Van Rossem, AJ, 1939. East-central Mexico.
- Sitta pygmaea elii Phillips, AR, 1986. Northeastern Mexico.

This species is very similar to the brown-headed nuthatch of the southeastern United States; their ranges have no overlap. Brown-headed nuthatch differs in having an orangey-brown (not grayish) cap, a more obvious white spot on the nape, and less white in the tail.

== In popular culture ==
The pygmy nuthatch features prominently in the climax of the 2000 film Charlie's Angels, in which Cameron Diaz's character, Natalie, discovers the location of the villains' fortress by identifying the call of the pygmy nuthatch, which she says only live in Carmel, California. The bird shown however is not a pygmy nuthatch, which in any case is found in a much wider range; the film imposter is a Venezuelan troupial and the call is of a fox sparrow.
