= Quercus subsericea =

Conservation status
- Near Threatened (IUCN 3.1)

Scientific classification
- Kingdom: Plantae
- Clade: Embryophytes
- Clade: Tracheophytes
- Clade: Spermatophytes
- Clade: Angiosperms
- Clade: Eudicots
- Clade: Rosids
- Order: Fagales
- Family: Fagaceae
- Genus: Quercus
- Subgenus: Quercus subg. Cerris
- Section: Quercus sect. Cyclobalanopsis
- Species: Q. subsericea

Binomial name
- Quercus subsericea A.Camus

Synonyms
- Quercus sericea Scheff.; Synaedrys sericea Koidz.

Species of oak tree

Quercus subsericea is a tree species in the beech family Fagaceae. There are no known subspecies. It is placed in subgenus Cerris, section Cyclobalanopsis.

It is native to western Java, Sumatra, Peninsular Malaysia, and Borneo.This oak species is an emergent tropical forest tree, growing up to 52 m. tall and 0.86 m. dbh It grows in submontane and lower montane forests from 850 to 1,500 metres elevation.

The species was described by Aimée Antoinette Camus in 1933.
