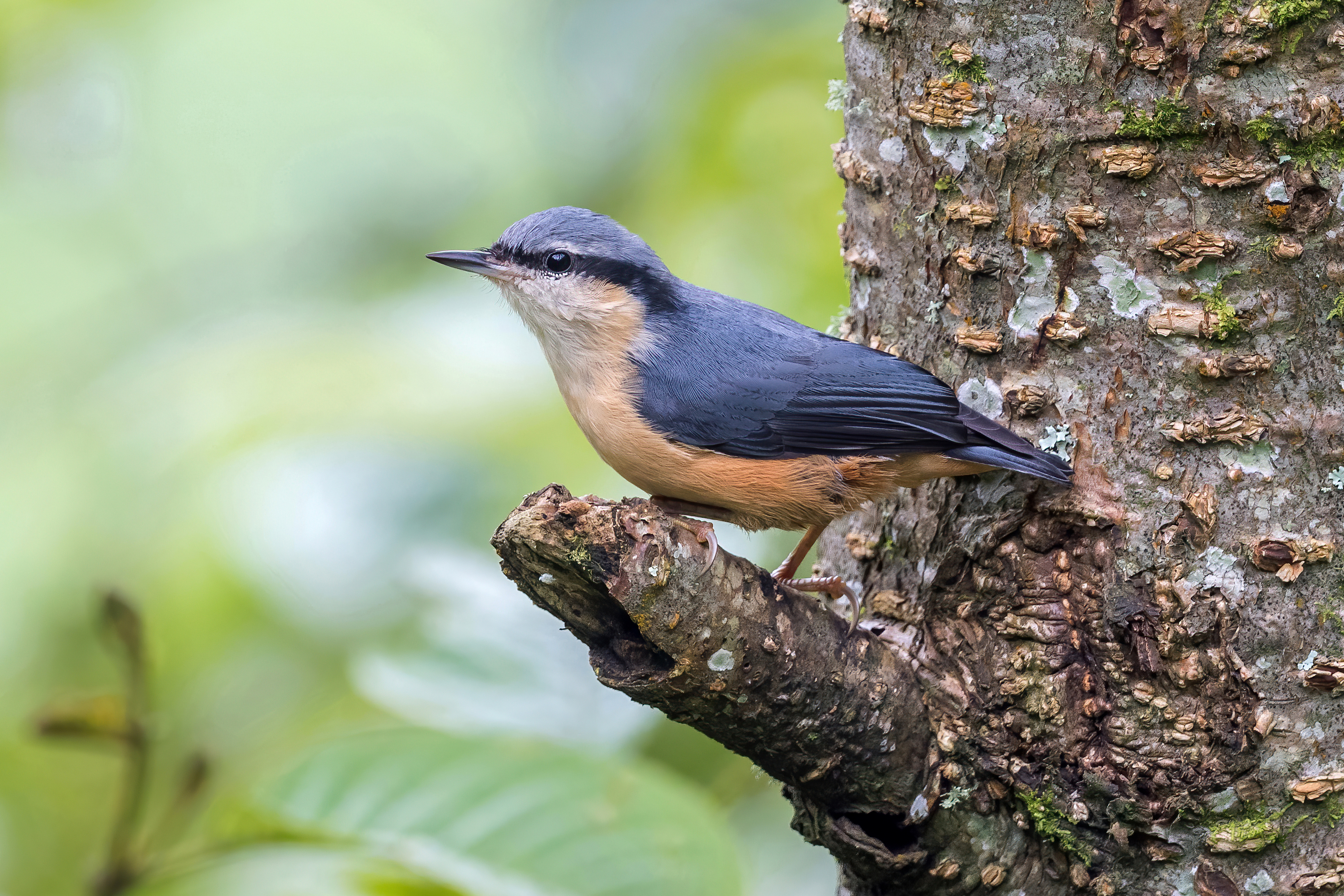
- In Nibuwatar, Nepal

Conservation status
- Least Concern (IUCN 3.1)

Scientific classification
- Kingdom: Animalia
- Phylum: Chordata
- Class: Aves
- Order: Passeriformes
- Family: Sittidae
- Genus: Sitta
- Species: S. himalayensis

Binomial name
- Sitta himalayensis Jardine & Selby, 1835

= White-tailed nuthatch =

Species of bird

The white-tailed nuthatch (Sitta himalayensis) is a species of bird in the family Sittidae. It ranges across the northern and northeastern parts of the Indian subcontinent, existing mainly in the low-to-middle Himalayas, as well as associated mountain ranges. It is found in Bhutan, India, Laos, Myanmar, Nepal, Tibet and Thailand.

== Description and ecology ==
It is 12 cm long, slightly smaller than the other related Himalayan nuthatches, and may be identified by the buff underside, smaller beak than in the Kashmir nuthatch (S. cashmirensis), and paler blue-grey mantle than others except for Kashmir nuthatch. The white patch on the centre of the upper tail coverts is difficult to see in the field. It has a small bill and pale orangey underparts with unmarked bright rufous undertail-coverts. The black eyestripe is broader than that of Kashmir nuthatch, and flared wider behind the eye.

It is resident in the sub-Himalayan range from Himachal Pradesh to Arunachal Pradesh and into the South Assam Hills (Lushai Hills). It breeds from March to May in broad-leaved and mixed forest.

== Habitat ==
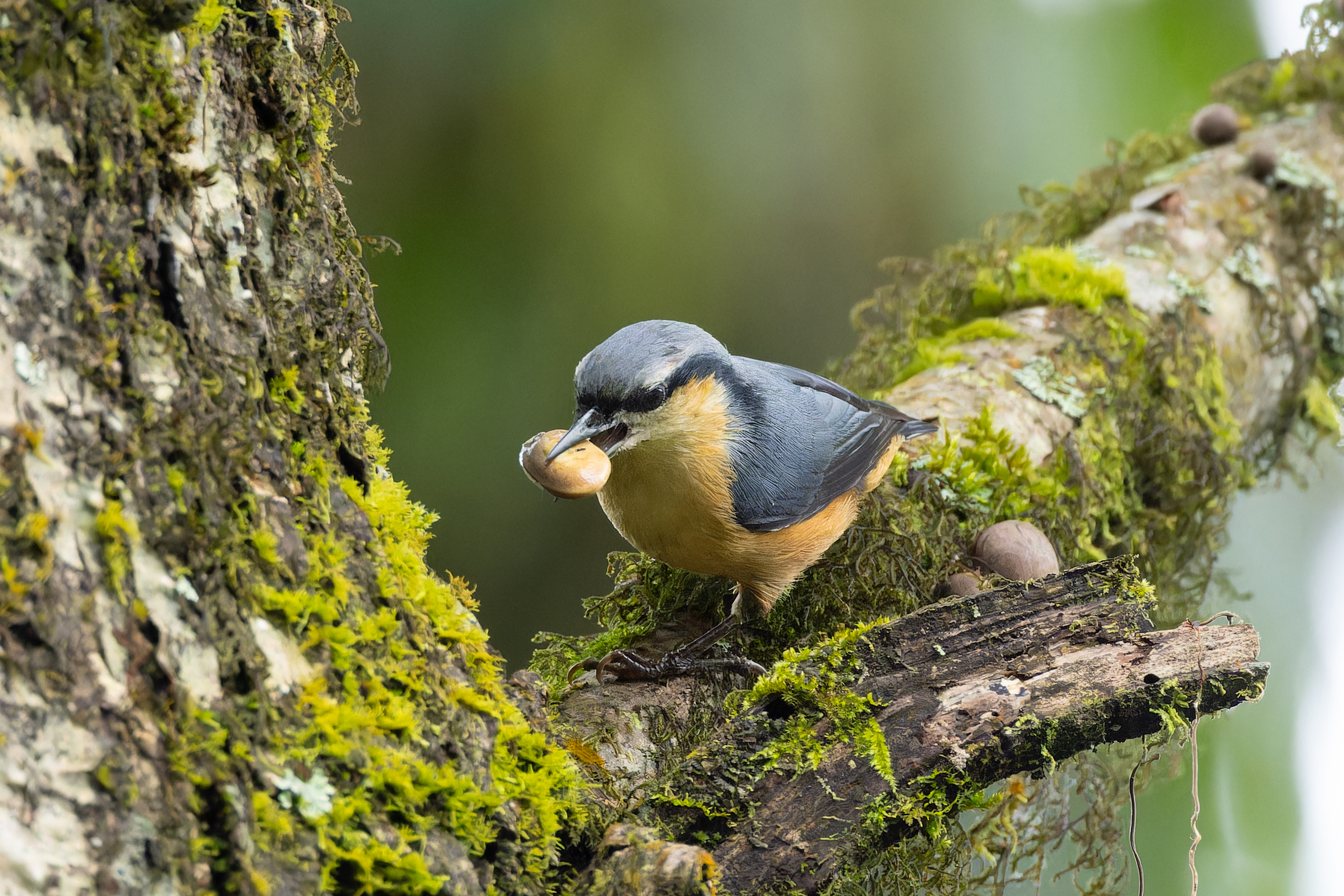
Sitta himalayensis with food in Lava, West Bengal, India.

Its natural habitats are subtropical or tropical moist lowland broadleaf forests and subtropical or tropical moist montane forests; it breeds at 1,500–3,400 m altitude, descending in winter to as low as 920 m.
