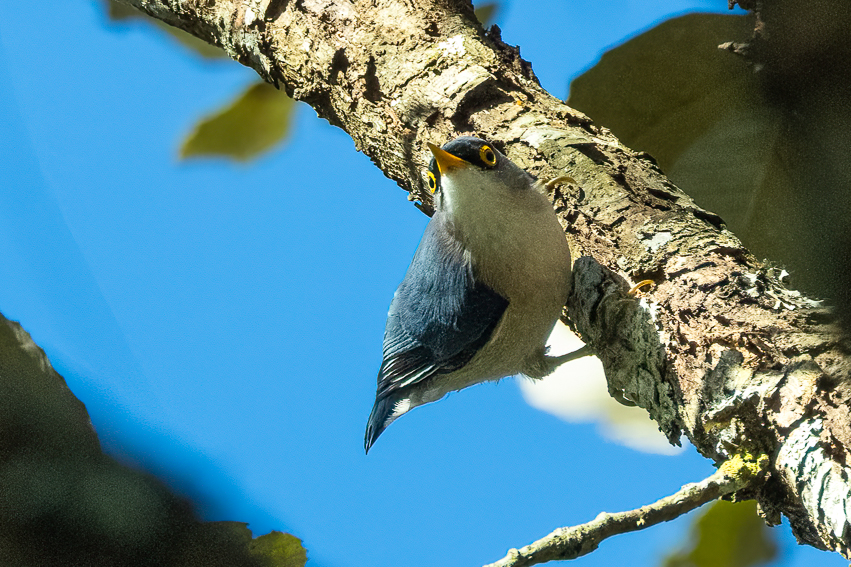

Conservation status
- Near Threatened (IUCN 3.1)

Scientific classification
- Kingdom: Animalia
- Phylum: Chordata
- Class: Aves
- Order: Passeriformes
- Family: Sittidae
- Genus: Sitta
- Species: S. solangiae

Binomial name
- Sitta solangiae (Delacour & Jabouille, 1930)

= Yellow-billed nuthatch =

Species of bird

The yellow-billed nuthatch (Sitta solangiae) is a species of bird in the family Sittidae. It is found in Hainan, Laos, and Vietnam.

Its natural habitats are subtropical or tropical moist lowland forests and subtropical or tropical moist montane forests. It is threatened by habitat loss.
