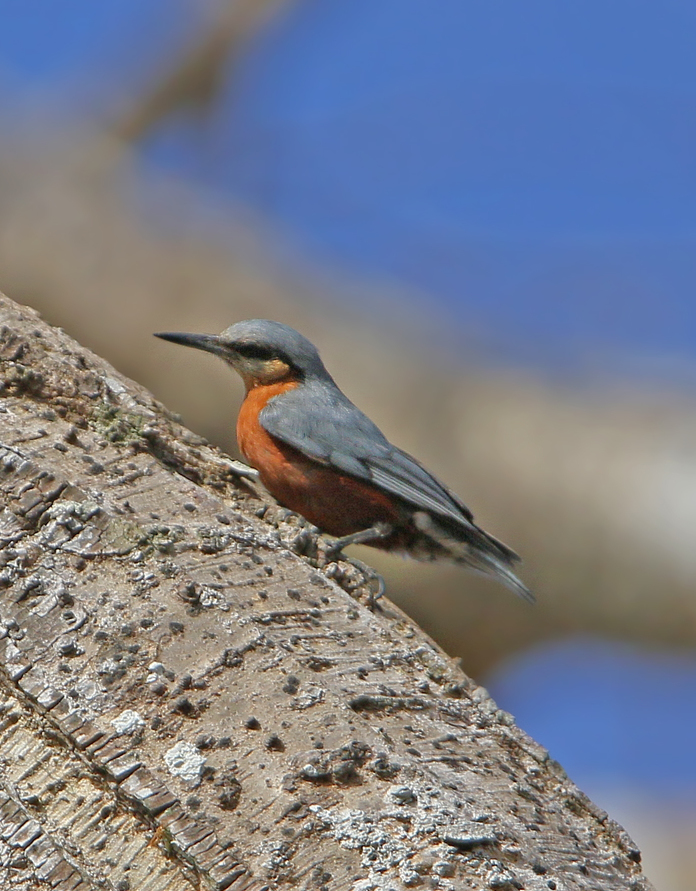
- In Vietnam

Scientific classification
- Kingdom: Animalia
- Phylum: Chordata
- Class: Aves
- Order: Passeriformes
- Family: Sittidae
- Genus: Sitta
- Species: S. neglecta

Binomial name
- Sitta neglecta Walden, 1870

= Burmese nuthatch =

Species of bird

The Burmese nuthatch (Sitta neglecta), also known as the neglected nuthatch, is a species of bird in the family Sittidae. It is found in Myanmar, Thailand, Laos, Cambodia, and Vietnam.

Its natural habitats are subtropical or tropical dry forests, subtropical or tropical moist lowland forests, and subtropical or tropical moist montane forests.

This species was split by Rasmussen and Anderton (2005) from the chestnut-bellied nuthatch.
