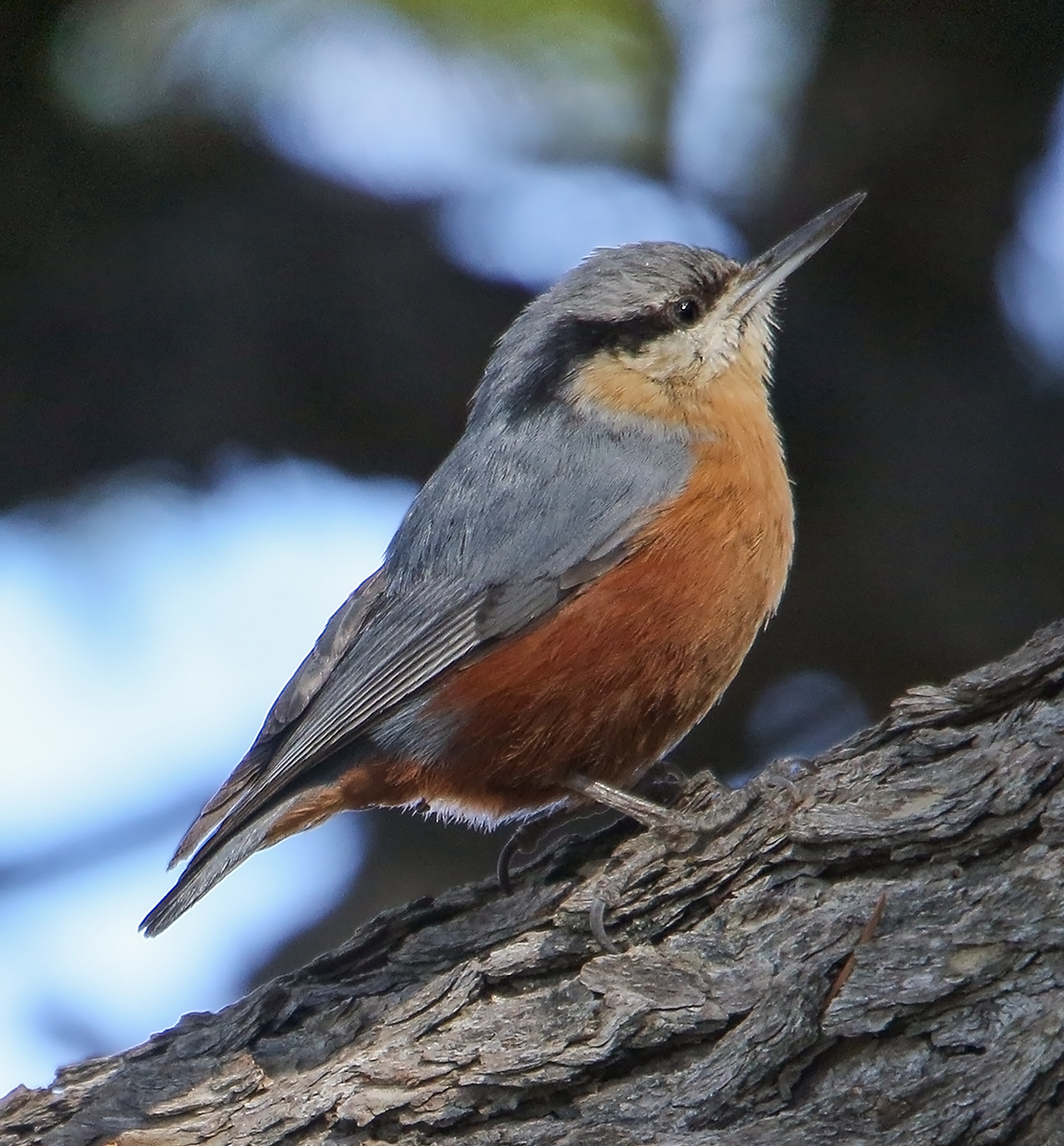

Conservation status
- Least Concern (IUCN 3.1)

Scientific classification
- Kingdom: Animalia
- Phylum: Chordata
- Class: Aves
- Order: Passeriformes
- Family: Sittidae
- Genus: Sitta
- Species: S. cashmirensis

Binomial name
- Sitta cashmirensis Brooks, 1871

= Kashmir nuthatch =

Species of bird

The Kashmir nuthatch (Sitta cashmirensis) is a species of bird in the family Sittidae. It is found in the northernmost regions of the Indian subcontinent, primarily in the mid-altitudes of the Himalayas. The species ranges across Afghanistan, India, Nepal and Pakistan. The global population size has not been quantified, but the species is described as common in eastern Afghanistan and north-western India, and fairly common in Nepal (Harrap and Quinn 1996).

== Habitat ==
It makes its home in the subtropical and tropical humid montane forests. It prefers a high altitude, from 1,800 to 3,350 meters.

== Description ==
This bird measures 14 cm (5.5 in) long and has mostly grey upper parts, reddish underparts and a pale throat and chin.
