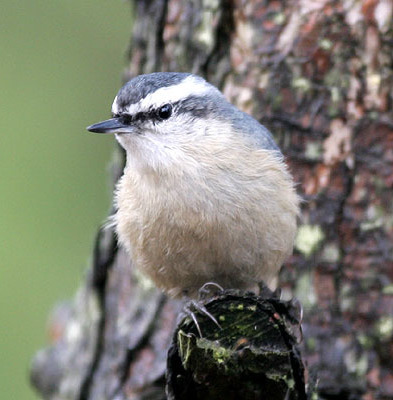
- In Korea

Conservation status
- Least Concern (IUCN 3.1)

Scientific classification
- Kingdom: Animalia
- Phylum: Chordata
- Class: Aves
- Order: Passeriformes
- Family: Sittidae
- Genus: Sitta
- Species: S. villosa

Binomial name
- Sitta villosa Verreaux, 1865
- Range of the Chinese nuthatch

Synonyms
- Sitta pekinensis (David, 1867); Sitta villosa yamashinai (Momiyama, 1931)

= Chinese nuthatch =

Species of bird

The Chinese nuthatch or snowy-browed nuthatch (Sitta villosa) is a species of bird in the family Sittidae. It is a small nuthatch, measuring 11.5 cm (4.5 in) in length. The upperparts are blue-grey and the underparts from a dull buff-greyish to a cinnamon-orange; the cheeks are white. There is a marked sexual dimorphism: the adult male is distinguished by its very black crown, while that of the female is the same blue-grey as the back, or at most dark grey when the plumage is worn. In both sexes, a dark grey eyestripe extends in front of and behind the eye, topped by a clear white supercilium separating it from the crown. The song is variable, and composed of repetitions of small invariant whistles. The species feeds mainly on insects in summer and completes its diet with seeds and fruits. The nest is generally placed in the hole of a conifer. The pairs raises one brood per year, with five or six chicks.

The Chinese nuthatch lives from central China to the northeast of the country, as far as Korea and the extreme southeast of Russia. The Chinese nuthatch is phylogenetically related to the Corsican nuthatch (S. whiteheadi) and both species are themselves closely related to the North American red-breasted nuthatch (S. canadensis). Because the bird's range is so large and numbers do not appear to decline significantly, the International Union for Conservation of Nature considers the species to be of "least concern". Three regional subspecies are distinguished, with slightly different colours.

== Taxonomy ==
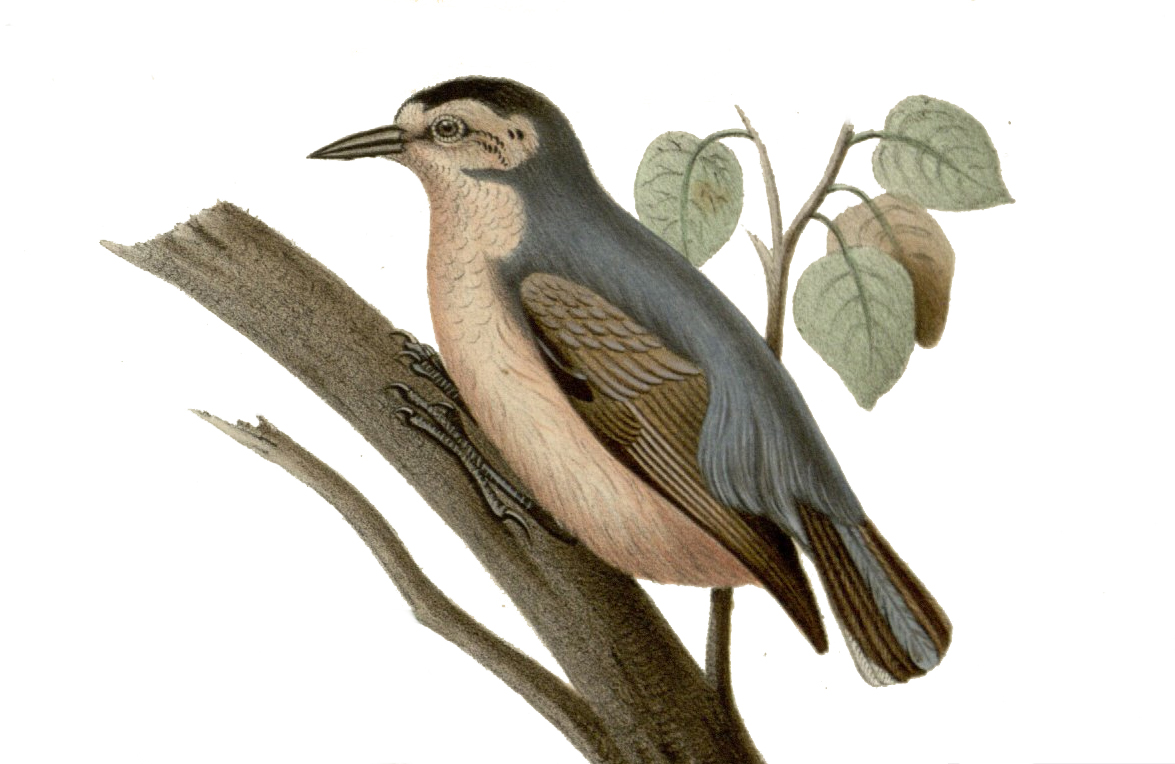
Illustration of 1865 of a Chinese nuthatch by Josephe Huët, accompanying the original description of the species by Jules Verreaux.

=== Nomenclature and subspecies ===
The Chinese nuthatch was described in 1865 by the French ornithologist Jules Verreaux, based on specimens sent from Beijing by the missionary Armand David in 1862, who also referred to it as Sitta pekinensis in 1867. Verreaux described the species as close to red-breasted nuthatch (Sitta canadensis) but with long, silky plumage, and thus gave the specific name "villosa", from the Latin for "hairy". German ornithologist Hans Edmund Wolters proposed the division of the genus Sitta into subgenera in 1975–1982. The Chinese nuthatch is placed in Sitta (Micrositta). According to the International Ornithological Congress there are three subspecies:

- Sitta villosa villosa (Verreaux, 1865), the nominate subspecies, is described in 1865 by Jules Verreaux, ranges from south-east Siberia to north-central and north-east China.
- Sitta villosa bangsi (Stresemann, 1929), described in 1929 by the German ornithologist Erwin Stresemann based on a specimen from northeastern Qinghai, originally as a subspecies of the red-breasted nuthatch. This subspecies occurs to the west of S. v. villosa in central western China.
- Sitta villosa corea (Ogilvie-Grant, 1906), described by the Scottish ornithologist William Robert Ogilvie-Grant from specimens from 180 km (110 mi) southeast of Seoul. It is found to the east of S. v. villosa on the Korean peninsula and in southeast Siberia. This taxon is often considered a variant of the nominate subspecies, but Nazarenko suggested in 2006 that it should be retained as valid, which was endorsed in the 2014 fourth edition of the Howard and Moore Complete Checklist of the Birds of the World, and later in version 5.2 (April 2015) of the International Ornithological Congress classification.

The Japanese ornithologist Toku Tarô Momiyama also later used the name Sitta villosa yamashinai (Momiyama, 1931), but this name is not associated with any valid scientific description and therefore is a nomen nudum.

=== Molecular phylogeny ===
In 1998, Eric Pasquet studied the cytochrome-b of the mitochondrial DNA of a dozen nuthatch species, including the various species of the Sitta canadensis group, which are also those that comprise the subgenus Micrositta: canadensis, villosa, yunnanensis, whiteheadi, krueperi and ledanti. The Yunnan nuthatch (S. yunnanensis) is not included in the study. Pasquet concludes that the Chinese nuthatch is phylogenetically related to the Corsican nuthatch (S. whiteheadi) and the red-breasted nuthatch, these three species form the sister group of a clade including Krüper's nuthatch (S. krueperi) and the Algerian nuthatch (S. ledanti). The first three species would even be close enough to be conspecific. For the sake of taxonomic stability, however, all retain their status as species in their own right. In 2014, Eric Pasquet and colleagues published a phylogeny based on nuclear and mitochondrial DNA of 21 nuthatch species and confirmed the relationships of the 1998 study within the "canadensis group", adding the Yunnan nuthatch, which was found to be sister to all other species in the group.

Phylogenetic tree detail:

- - Yunnan nuthatch (S. yunnanensis)
  - - - Red-breasted nuthatch (S. canadensis)
      - - Corsican nuthatch (S. whiteheadi)
        - Chinese nuthatch (S. villosa)
    - - Krüper's nuthatch (S. krueperi)
      - Algerian nuthatch (S. ledanti)

=== Biogeography ===
With its phylogeny established, Pasquet concluded that the paleogeographic history of the group would be as follows: the divergence between the two main clades of the "canadensis group" appears to have occurred more than five million years ago, at the end of the Miocene, when the common ancestor of S. krueperi and S. ledanti entered the Mediterranean basin at the time of the Messinian salinity crisis; the two species diverged 1.75 million years ago. The other clade split into three, with populations leaving Asia for the east, giving rise to the red-breasted nuthatch, and then from the west, about one million years ago, marking the separation between the Corsican and Chinese nuthatches.

== Description ==
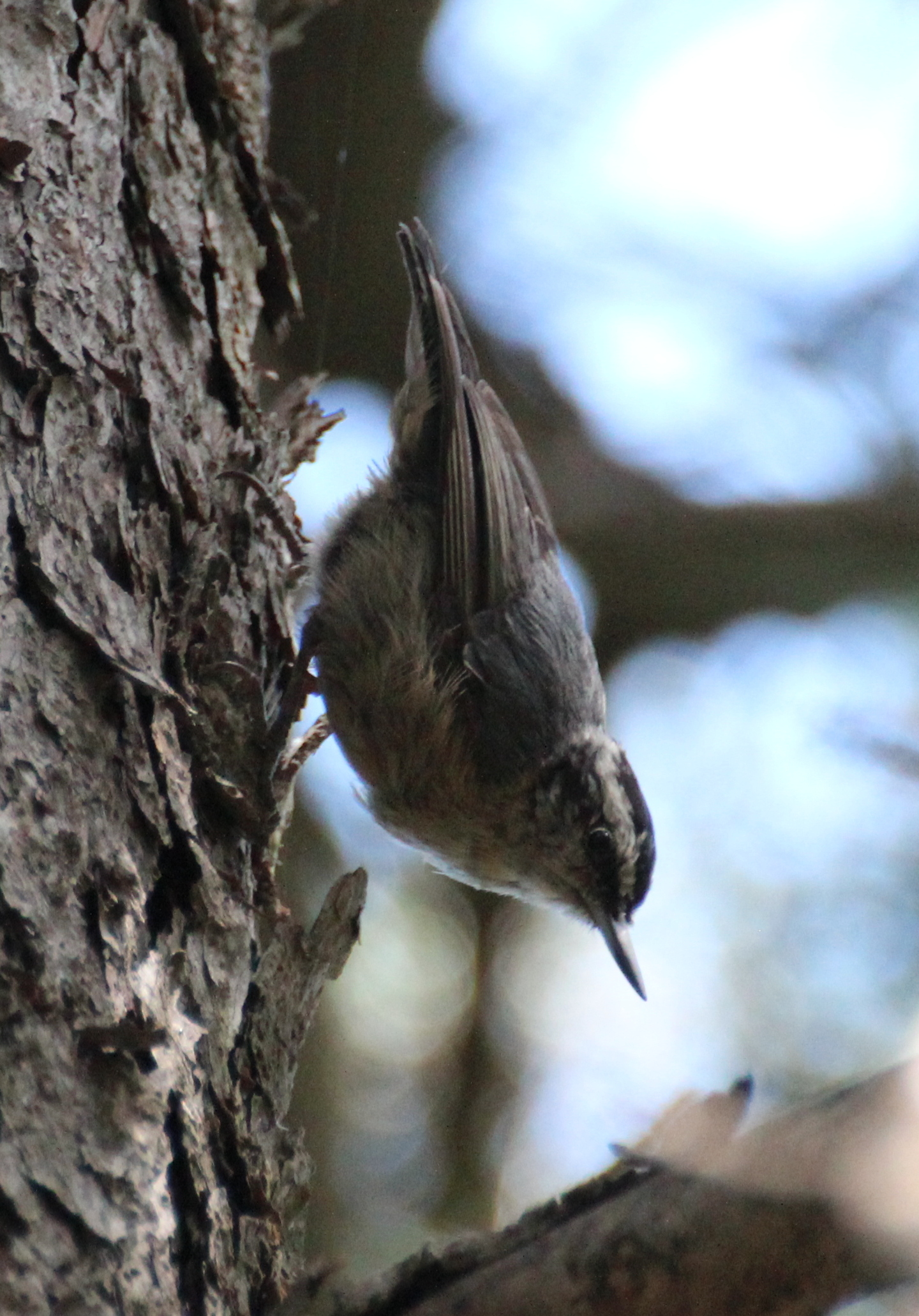
A Chinese nuthatch descending a tree trunk head first in China

=== Plumage and measurements ===
The Chinese nuthatch is a small nuthatch, measuring 11.5 cm (4.5 in) in length. The upperparts of the Chinese nuthatch are blue-grey, with the crown shiny black to dark grey; the underparts are light, ranging from dull buff-grey to cinnamon orange. The colour varies a bit depending on the sex, plumage wear and subspecies. The species has a marked white supercilium, as well as a more or less well defined black eyestripe. The bill is thin and pointed, with the edge of the upper mandible (the culmen) straight, which may give the impression that the tip of the bill is rising upwards. The bill is slate-black, with the base of the lower mandible blue-grey. The iris is brown to dark brown, and the legs and toes are dull, blue-grey to brownish-grey.

There is a marked sexual dimorphism: the male has a very black crown and a clear black eyestripe framing a contrasting white supercilium, while in the female the crown is barely darker than the rest of the upperparts in fresh plumage, becomes a darker and more contrasting sooty-grey, especially on the forehead, and in some cases the entire crown is sooty-black. Its eyestripe is also less well defined, duller, and its supercilium thinner. The female is overall duller than the male, notably with the scapulars less vivid, the wing feathers edged with brown and the underparts darker and less brightly coloured. The juvenile male has a blacker crown than the darker female, but still less black and less bright than the adult male; its underparts are darker and more cinnamon-coloured. In the nominate subspecies, juveniles also have cinnamon edging on their wing feathers, whereas the adult feather edges are generally duller, tending to grey. In the subspecies S. v. bangsi, adults have cinnamon feather margins, and are overall more brightly coloured than subspecies S. v. villosa, with the male having orange-cinnamon and the female dull buff-cinnamon and dull underparts. However, in late winter, both subspecies are paler and fairly similar colours. The subspecies S. v. corea is paler, more greyish, and marginally smaller than the nominate subspecies.

=== Similar species ===
This species is locally found in sympatry with the Eurasian nuthatch (S. europaea), but differs from it in its smaller size, clearly visible white supercilium, black crown in males, and relatively plain underparts, lacking the reddish undertail coverts and flanks. In the west of its range, the Chinese nuthatch can also be found with Przevalski's nuthatch (S. przewalskii), and both have brightly cinnamon-coloured underparts. The Chinese nuthatch is easily distinguished by its black eyestripe, while Przevalski's nuthatch has very light cheeks contrasting with the breast. The Chinese nuthatch is phylogenetically and morphologically very close to the Corsican nuthatch, which is, however, endemic to Corsica and generally has much less vivid underparts; a Chinese nuthatch in worn plumage has underparts that are just more buff than a Corsican nuthatch in fresh plumage. Both species are closely related to the red-breasted nuthatch, which has even brighter underparts, with a more prominent eye streak.

Similar or phylogenetically related species

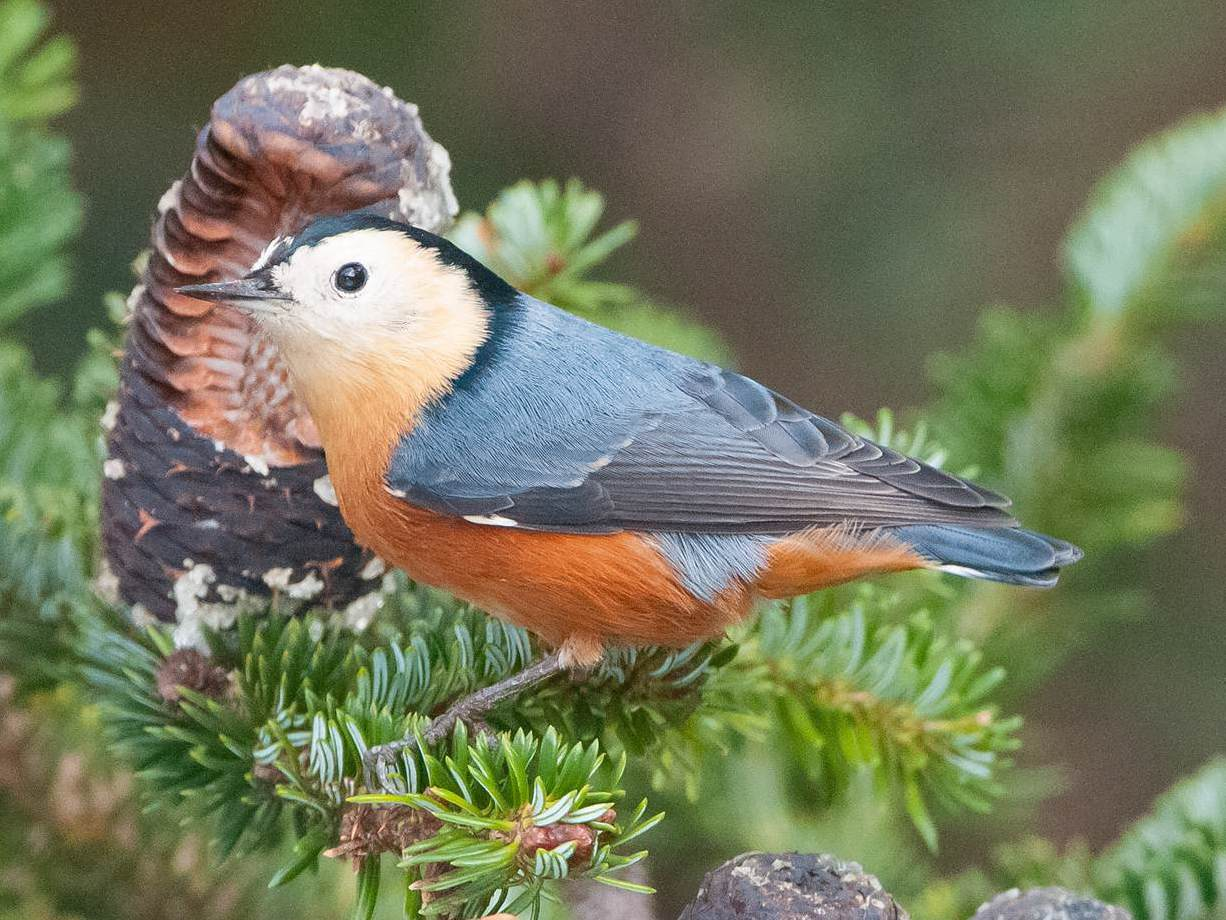
Przevalski's nuthatch (S. przewalskii)

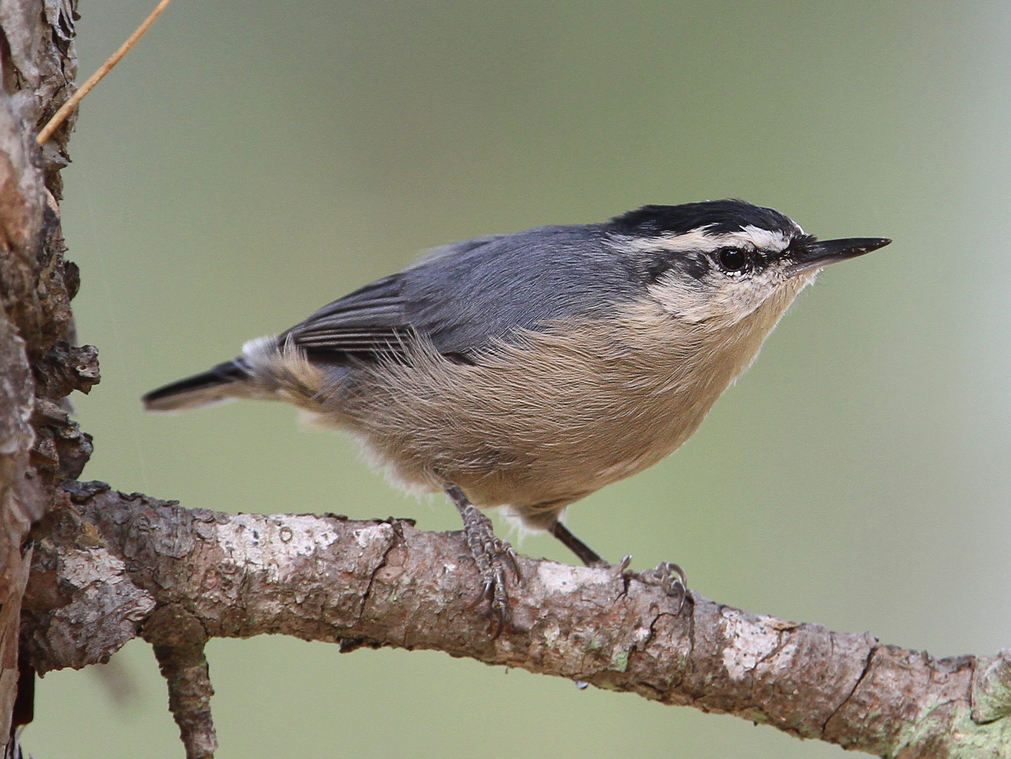
Corsican nuthatch (S. whiteheadi)

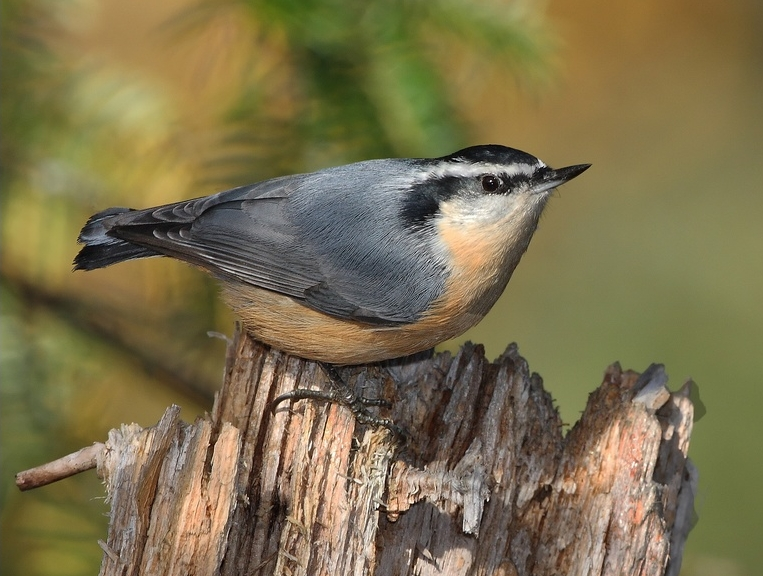
Red-breasted nuthatch (S. canadensis)

== Ecology and behaviour ==
=== Voice ===
The Chinese nuthatch sings from the tops of pine and spruce trees. Harrap gives three basic types of calls. The first is a harsh, prolonged schraa, schraa call, reminiscent of the Eurasian jay (Garrulus glandarius), and similar to some calls found in the Corsican nuthatch, Algerian nuthatch, and Krüper's nuthatch. Given, in agitation or excitement, singly or in irregular series at intervals of 0.31-1 second. The second type is a various quiet, conversational, single short units, more melodic or piping and repeated in series of whip, whip whip... or quip-quip-quip, sometimes becoming a quit, quit... squeak. The song is composed of this type of calls, in number from five to thirty, the volume increasing in the first part of the song. Small ascending whistles are also emitted, at a rate of seven notes per second and for 1.5 to 2.25 seconds, sometimes introduced by a higher note, forming a tsi-pui-pui-pui-pui.... A variant is a much flatter, less musical and more monotous rattle (c. 12 units per second), duiduiduidui..., recalling song variants of chestnut-vented nuthatch in speed of delivery and duration, but a little mellower and lower-pitched. The last type of call consists of short, nasal notes, quir, quir, produced in long, very rapid series, or in an irregular manner.

=== Food ===
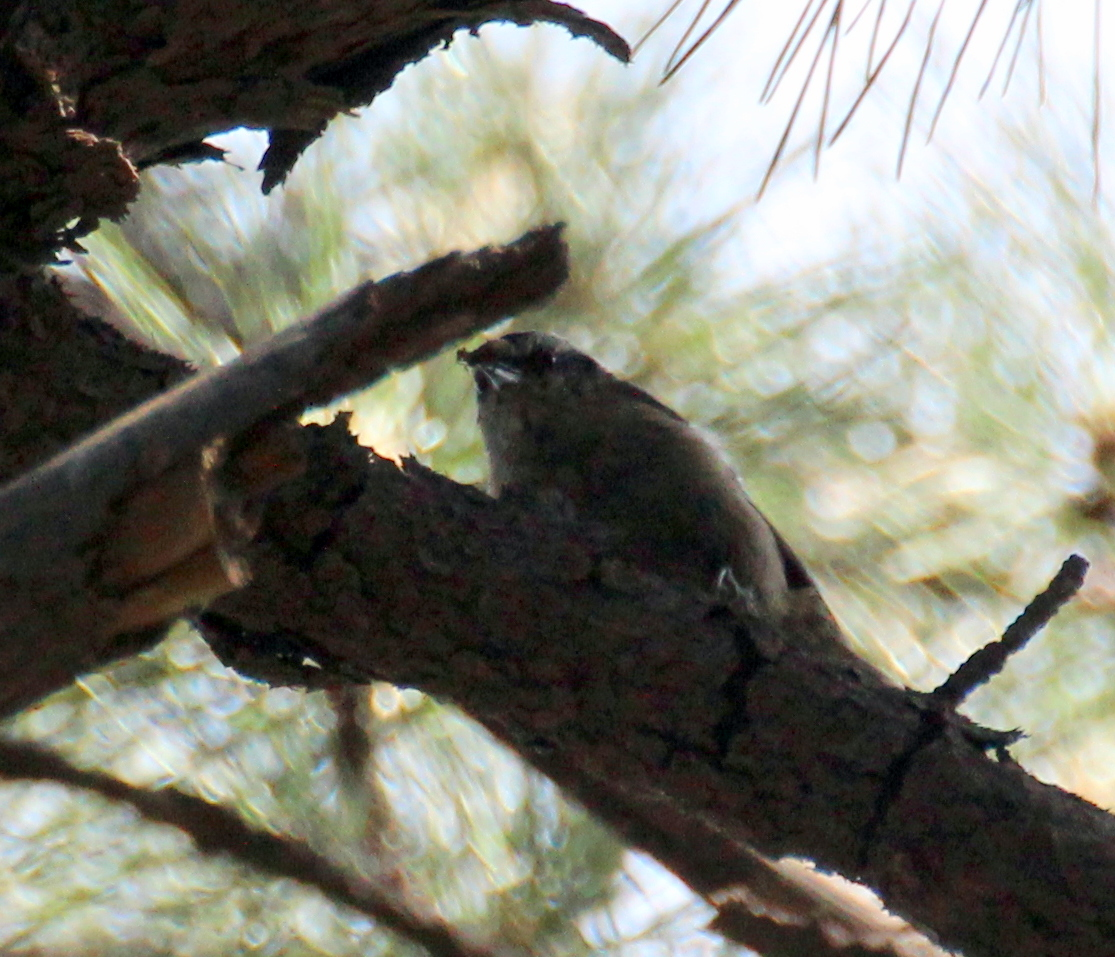
A Chinese nuthatch capturing an insect with its beak.

In summer, the Chinese nuthatch feeds almost exclusively on insects, which are also the sole source of food for the young. From April to August, studies in China showed that 98.5% of its diet consisted of insects, including beetles (Coleoptera), Hymenoptera, butterflies, bugs (Heteroptera), Homoptera (including aphids and Cicadidae), Neuroptera and flies (Diptera). It consumes larger insects by holding them with its legs and shredding them with its bill; it can also capture insects in flight. Like other nuthatches, the Chinese nuthatch stores food. In winter, the Chinese nuthatch's diet consists primarily of nuts, seeds, and tree fruits. The species often takes part in mixed-species foraging flocks in winter, where it is observed in pairs.

=== Breeding ===
In Jilin, the breeding season takes place from late April to early May. The nest is usually placed high in a cavity in a conifer (more than 9 m (350 in) above the ground, on average), but can also be built in a rotten stump or in an old building. The nest entrance is about 35 mm (1.4 in) in diameter (does not apparently, daub the nest hole with mud or resin). Both partners build the nest within seven to eight days, making a bowl from plant fibres, feathers, and grasses. The egg–laying has four to nine eggs, most often a clutch of five or six; the eggs are white, marked with reddish-brown and measuring 15 mm–17 mm × 12.5 mm–13 mm (0.59 in–0.67 in × 0.49 in–0.51 in). The female incubates alone while the male feeds her, and the young hatch from the egg after 15–17 days of incubation. Both parents participate in their feeding, and raise only one brood in a year.

=== Parasites ===
A feather mite, Pteroherpus surmachi, was described from the Chinese nuthatch in 2011 by Russian arachnologist Sergei V. Mironov.

== Distribution and habitat ==
The Chinese nuthatch is distributed over northeast China, Korea, and the extreme southeast of Russia. It has been reported from the Russian island of Sakhalin, but may only be a vagrant there. In China, it ranges from eastern Qinghai in the west to southeastern and central Gansu, most of Shaanxi, Shanxi, southern Liaoning on the Liaoning peninsula, northern Hebei, Beijing Municipality, and northern Sichuan. It was recorded from northern North Korea, with some dispersal into surrounding areas in autumn; it was observed in North Hamgyong in July–August and, in May–November, in North Kyongsang, including North P'yongan. It is a very rare winter visitor in South Korea, with records from the mountains of Kyonggi (October–March, also July 1917) and North Kyongsang in November; the only recent South Korean record is from the Kwangnung Experimental Forest, near Song, Kangwon province, in March 1968. In the peninsula, it is closely associated with Japanese Red Pine (Pinus densiflora) forests. In China, it inhabits coniferous forests (Pinus, Picea), sometimes mixed with oaks (Quercus) and birches (Betula).

In the summer of 2006, a Dutch group on an entomological expedition incidentally observed a pair of nuthatches nesting in the Altai, more or less on the crossing of China, Kazakhstan, Mongolia, and Russia, in a pure Siberian larch (Larix sibirica) forest at 2,150 m (85,000 in) altitude. They observed that the male had a black crown, the female without black crown, and said that both have a distinct dark eyestripe topped by a white supercilium. If the European nuthatch is present in the region (subspecies S. e. asiatica), the observers assure that the black crown of the male and the small size of the individuals exclude a misidentification with this Eurasian species. The closest species geographically that could fit this description is the Chinese nuthatch, which would then be far from its known distribution (1,500 km (930 mi) from the breeding range), and which has more buffy underparts than the observed individuals. To observers, this record could be indicative of a much wider distribution of the Chinese species, or the bird could be an as yet undescribed species related to S. whiteheadi and S. villosa. These two species with distributions 7,000 km (4,300 mi) apart are reminiscent of the case of the two blue magpies of the genus Cyanopica, the azure-winged magpie (C. cyanus) from eastern Asia, and the Iberian magpie (C. cooki) from Portugal and Spain. The exact identity of the Altay breeding pair requires focused research. The history of the discovery and description of the Algerian nuthatch exemplifies how difficult it may be to detect and describe highly isolated populations of nuthatches. In June 2017, during the breeding season, two Swiss ornithologists searched for this nuthatch at the reporting site, staying five nights to prospect in the surrounding forests from the tree line to the valley floor. Three breeding pairs with at least one and two young nuthatches S. europaea asiatica were identified and were the only nuthatch species around. Despite actively looking for food, all the adult nuthatches responded to the species' song replay, and most of the nuthatches were first detected by their call and/or song. The authors conclude that the 2006 sighting was probably of the local Eurasian subspecies, which may have odd-plumaged, or abraded or stained asiatica.

== Status and threats ==
The range is estimated at 1,810,000 km^{2} (700,000 sq mi) according to BirdLife International. Total numbers are not known, but Mark Brazil's guide to East Asian birds places the species in the infrequent category in China (corresponding to a range of 100 to 10,000 mature pairs) and less than 1,000 migratory individuals are estimated in Korea. Populations are possibly declining due to the destruction of the bird's habitat, but the species is considered to be of "least concern" by the International Union for Conservation of Nature. A 2009 study attempted to predict the impact that climate change may have on the distribution of several nuthatch species in Asia, modelling two scenarios; the Chinese nuthatch could see its distribution decrease by 79.8–80.4% by the years 2040 to 2069.

== Footnotes ==
1. In S. v. villosa, the folded wing measures 63–70 mm (2.5–2.8 in) for the male, 63–79 mm (2.5–3.1 in) for the female; in the subspecies S. v. bangsi, it is 67–75 mm (2.6–3.0 in) for the male, 67–72 mm (2.6–2.8 in) for the female. In S. v. villosa, the tail measures 34–40 mm (1.3–1.6 in) for the male, 31–38 mm (1.2–1.5 in) for the female; in S. v. bangsi, it is 37–41 mm (1.5–1.6 in) for the male, 35–40 mm (1.4–1.6 in) for the female. The bill measures 14.5–18 mm (0.57–0.71 in) and the tarsus 13.5–17 mm (0.53–0.67 in). The adult weighs 8–11 grams (0.28–0.39 oz), and 11.3 grams (0.40 oz) on average for maturing juveniles.
