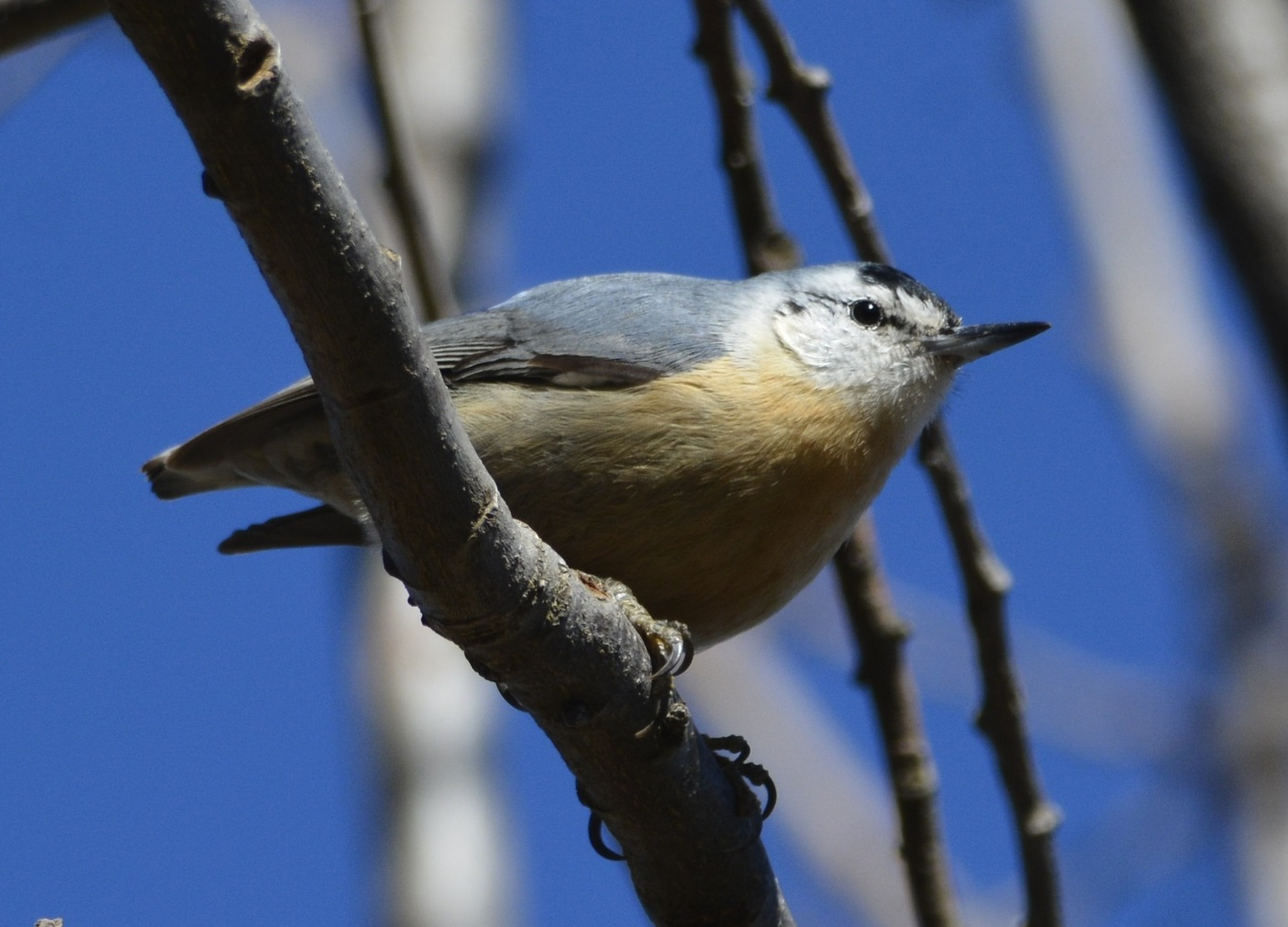

Conservation status
- Endangered (IUCN 3.1)

Scientific classification
- Kingdom: Animalia
- Phylum: Chordata
- Class: Aves
- Order: Passeriformes
- Family: Sittidae
- Genus: Sitta
- Species: S. ledanti

Binomial name
- Sitta ledanti Vielliard, 1976
- Distribution map showing the forests used by the nuthatch in red

= Algerian nuthatch =

Species of bird endemic to Algeria

The Algerian nuthatch or Kabyle nuthatch (Sitta ledanti) is a species of bird in the nuthatch family Sittidae. It is a medium-sized nuthatch, measuring between 11.5 cm (4.5 in) and 12.5 cm (4.9 in). The upperparts are bluish-grey. The male can be distinguished from the female by the black front of its crown. The species is sedentary; it feeds on arthropods in summer and on seeds in winter. The breeding season takes place around May–June. The nest, built in a hole of tree, shelters a laying of three or four eggs, brooded by the female. The chicks are fed by both parents.

The Kabyle nuthatch is the only bird species endemic to Algeria, where it now inhabits only certain coniferous and broadleaf forests in the Kabylia region in the north of the country. Its scientific name pays tribute to Jean-Paul Ledant, a Belgian amateur naturalist who discovered the bird in October 1975 and named it "la Sittelle Kabyle" (the Kabyle nuthatch); the description of the bird was made by the French ornithologist Jacques Vielliard. The news of this discovery greatly surprised the ornithological world and received international media coverage. The Algerian nuthatch is closely related to Krüper's nuthatch (Sitta krueperi). The bird has only a limited and relict range, threatened by fire, erosion and human action; the species is therefore considered "endangered" by the International Union for Conservation of Nature.

== Description ==
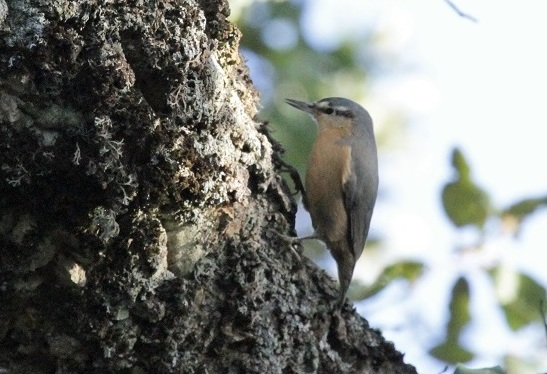
A female Algerian nuthatch, with very little black on the crown, barely spotting the front of the forehead.

The Algerian nuthatch is a medium-sized nuthatch; it measures between 11.5 cm (4.5 in) and 12.5 cm (4.9 in), and weighs about 18 grams (0.63 oz). The upperparts are overall bluish grey; the tail has a small subterminal white band bordered with beige. The belly is washed with light salmon-beige up to the undertail coverts; the latter are grey at their base. The male has a black forehead and a dark eyestripe, separated from the crown by a broad, sharp white supercilium. In females, the crown and eyestripe are the same grey as the back, with the front of the crown sometimes darker (when the plumage is worn), but not as dark as in males. In both sexes, the sides of the head and the throat are white. The iris are brown-black, the legs lead-grey and the bill bluish-grey. The juvenile plumage is similar to that of the female, but duller and with an inconspicuous supercilium; after leaving the nest, bill growth and pigmentation of the bill and legs are incomplete.

Within its range, the Kabyle nuthatch cannot be confused with any other bird. The closest nuthatch geographically is the Eurasian nuthatch (Sitta europaea) which inhabits Europe widely and some localities in the Moroccan Rif mountains; this species is larger than the Algerian, has no black on the crown and has orange-buff (or white for some subspecies) underparts tending to orange around the rump. The Kabyle nuthatch strongly resembles the Corsican nuthatch (Sitta whiteheadi), but the black crown differs in the males; that of the Algerian species covers the front of the head, as opposed to the whole head in the Corsican nuthatch. The underparts are of a warmer pinkish buff in the Algerian species. It is phylogenetically very close to Krüper's nuthatch (Sitta krueperi), with the front of the crown dark in the male and the supercilium marked white, but Krüper's nuthatch has pale grey underparts and a large russet-brown pectoral patch.

== Taxonomy and systematics ==
=== Discovery and nomenclature ===
The Algerian nuthatch was discovered in Algeria by Jean-Paul Ledant, a Belgian naturalist and ornithologist, on 5 October 1975. Identifying it as quite different from other nuthatches, he wrote to the Academy of Sciences to report his discovery. Working on a revision of Sittidae, they encouraged Ledant to return to the site. He tried several times during the winter, but the mountain was too snowy to allow exploration. Ledant was finally accompanied by Jacques Vielliard in mid-April 1976 to observe nesting, which actually occurred later in the year due to the massif range's difficult climatic conditions. They had to wait until July to observe feeding behaviour and a few fledglings, as well as to make recordings and call trials with songs of Corsican and Krüper nuthatches. Only a dozen pairs were observed, but on the 5–6 July, Vielliard killed a pair of adults that had finished feeding their chicks to be used as type specimens. Kept in the describer's house, these specimens (the holotype and paratype) were seriously damaged after 2005 by insects, and were finally given to the National Museum of Natural History, France in 2015.

The Algerian nuthatch was formally described in the journal Alauda by Jacques Vielliard in 1976 under its current name of Sitta ledanti. This discovery greatly surprised the ornithological world, as the bird seemed to come from a "lost world" that has withstood the test of time, the Babor Mountains. A species of bird endemic to the Mediterranean had not been discovered for nearly a century since the 1883 discovery of the Corsican nuthatch.

In December 1976, the Swiss ornithologist Eric Burnier announced in the journal Nos Oiseaux that he had discovered the species independently on 20 June of the same year, before learning from a 28 July article in Le Monde that he had been preceded in his discovery and that the species had just been named. He published a few drawings and field notes, explaining that he had spotted birds that he had judged to have the characteristics of the Corsican nuthatch and Krüper's nuthatch by song and then approached them only a few metres away. The only nuthatch in the Maghreb then known being the Eurasian nuthatch, which occurs in some localities of the Moroccan Rif and Atlas Mountains about 900 km from the Babor Mountains, he knew he was dealing with a new species.

=== Phylogeny ===
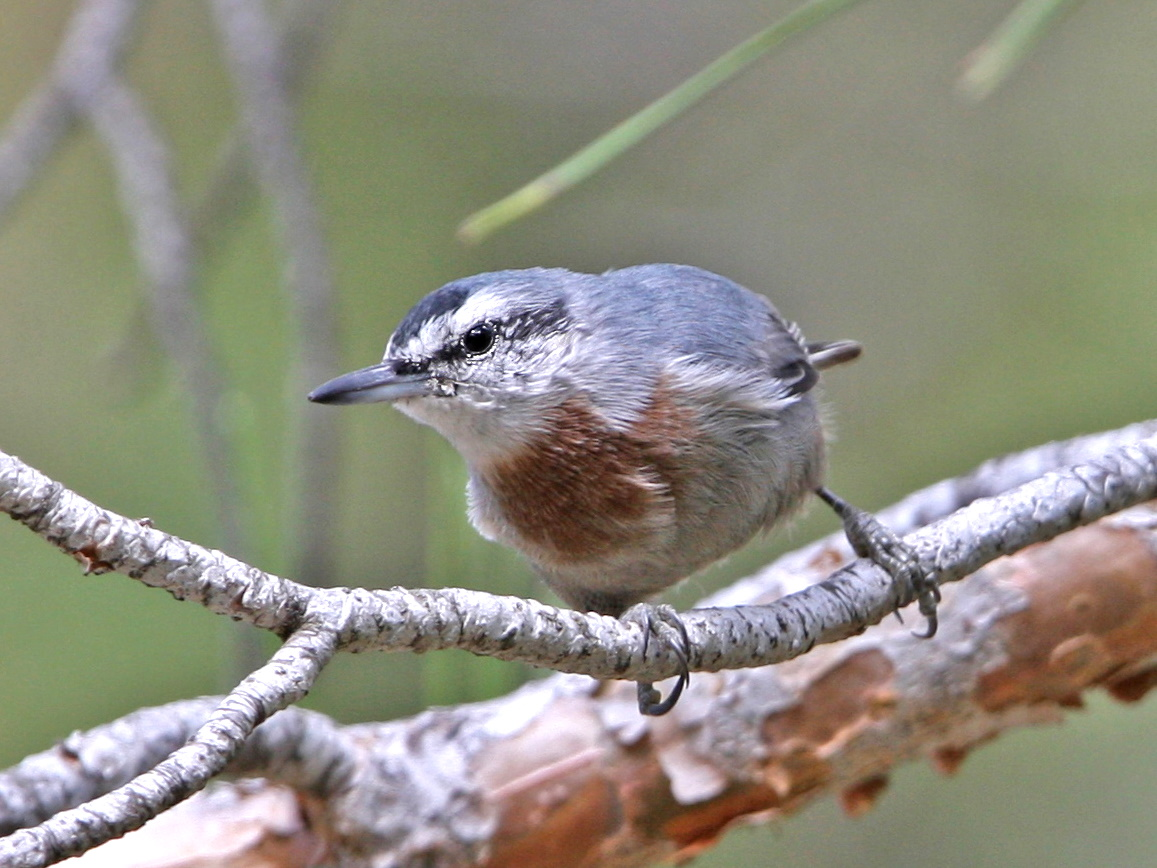
The male Krüper's nuthatch has the front half of the crown black, like the Algerian nuthatch; it is the closest relative of the latter species.

The Algerian nuthatch is placed in the subgenus Micrositta, described by the Russian ornithologist Sergei Buturlin in 1916, and has no subspecies. American ornithologist Charles Vaurie had grouped in 1957 the Corsican nuthatch, the red-breasted nuthatch (Sitta canadensis) and the Chinese nuthatch (Sitta villosa), which he considered to be very similar, in the "Sitta canadensis" group. In his 1976 description of the Algerian nuthatch, Vielliard devotes a portion of his paper to the possible relationships of the different species and their evolutionary history. He suggests that Vaurie stopped at a "superficial morphological similarity" to bring the Corsican nuthatch closer to the red-breasted nuthatch, and that the Corsican species should rather form with Krüper's nuthatch a group known as the "Mesogean nuthatches", "where Sitta ledanti providentially fits in". He considers it "tempting" to identify the fossil species Sitta senogalliensis (whose membership to the genus Sitta is discussed) described from the Upper Miocene in Italy as the ancestor of the Mesogean nuthatch group.

In 1998, Eric Pasquet studied the cytochrome b gene in the mitochondrial DNA of about ten nuthatch species, including the various species of the Sitta canadensis group, which he defined as comprising six species, corresponding to those reported in the subgenus, Micrositta: S. canadensis, S. villosa, S. whiteheadi, S. yunnanensis, S. krueperi and S. ledanti. Pasquet concluded that the Corsican nuthatch is phylogenetically related to the Chinese nuthatch and the red-breasted nuthatch, these three species forming the sister group of a clade including Krüper's nuthatch and the Algerian nuthatch. The first three species would even be close enough to constitute subspecies, rejecting the "Mesogean" theory of Vielliard and thus confirming the conclusions of Charles Vaurie. For the sake of taxonomic stability, however, all retain their full species status. In 2014, Eric Pasquet and colleagues published a phylogeny based on nuclear and mitochondrial DNA of 21 nuthatch species and confirmed the relationships of the 1998 study within the "Sitta canadensis group", adding the Yunnan nuthatch, which was found to be the most basal of the species.

The conclusions of these studies are in agreement with the morphology of the species, the red-breasted nuthatch, Corsican nuthatch and Chinese nuthatch sharing as a derived character the entirely black crown only present in males, a unique trait among the nuthatches and related families. The second clade, which includes Krüper's and Algerian nuthatches, have the front of the crown black in males, with this sexually dimorphic trait absent in juveniles.

The simplified cladogram below is based on the phylogenetic analysis of Packert and colleagues (2014):

- - Yunnan nuthatch (S. yunnanensis)
  - - - Algerian nuthatch (S. ledanti)
      - Krüper's nuthatch (S. krueperi)
    - - - Corsican nuthatch (S. whiteheadi)
        - Chinese nuthatch (S. villosa)
      - Red-breasted nuthatch (S. canadensis)

=== Biogeography ===
In 1976, the Swiss ornithologist Paul Géroudet suggested that the Mesogean nuthatches once inhabited a fairly continuous belt of conifers around the Mediterranean, which had become fragmented, leaving only a few hard-to-reach refuges where these different species were able to evolve in isolation. In 1998, his phylogeny having been established, Pasquet concluded that the paleogeographic history of the group would be as follows: the divergence between the two main clades of the "Sitta canadensis group" appeared more than 5 million years ago, at the end of the Miocene, when the S. krueperi and S. ledanti clade settled in the Mediterranean basin at the time of the Messinian salinity crisis; the two species making up the clade diverged 1.75 million years ago. The other clade split into three, with populations leaving Asia from the east and giving rise to the North American red-breasted nuthatch, and then, about a million years ago, from the west, marking the separation between the Corsican and Chinese nuthatches.

== Ecology and behaviour ==
=== Vocalisations ===
The call is a tsiit tsiit typical of a nuthatch. Adults also use a whispered call when an intruder is present, possibly for territorial defense. The song of the Algerian nuthatch is a nasal whistle, composed of a series of rising elements, with a short final note, repeated slowly and can be transcribed into a vuuy-di vuuy-di vuuy-di. It is a repetition of seven to twelve phrases lasting for two to four seconds. The bird may also produce a rapid trill in di-du-di-du-di-du, and when agitated, it emit a harsh and repeated chèèh comparable to the call of a jay.

=== Food ===
The Algerian nuthatch's diet has not been extensively studied. It varies according to the season. In summer, it feeds mainly on insects (mainly caterpillars and beetles) and spiders that it finds by surveying the trunks and branches of oak trees. In winter, insects are scarce and the Algerian nuthatch feeds on coniferous seeds which provide a constant supply. They generally feed alone, but may form mixed feeding flocks outside the breeding season.

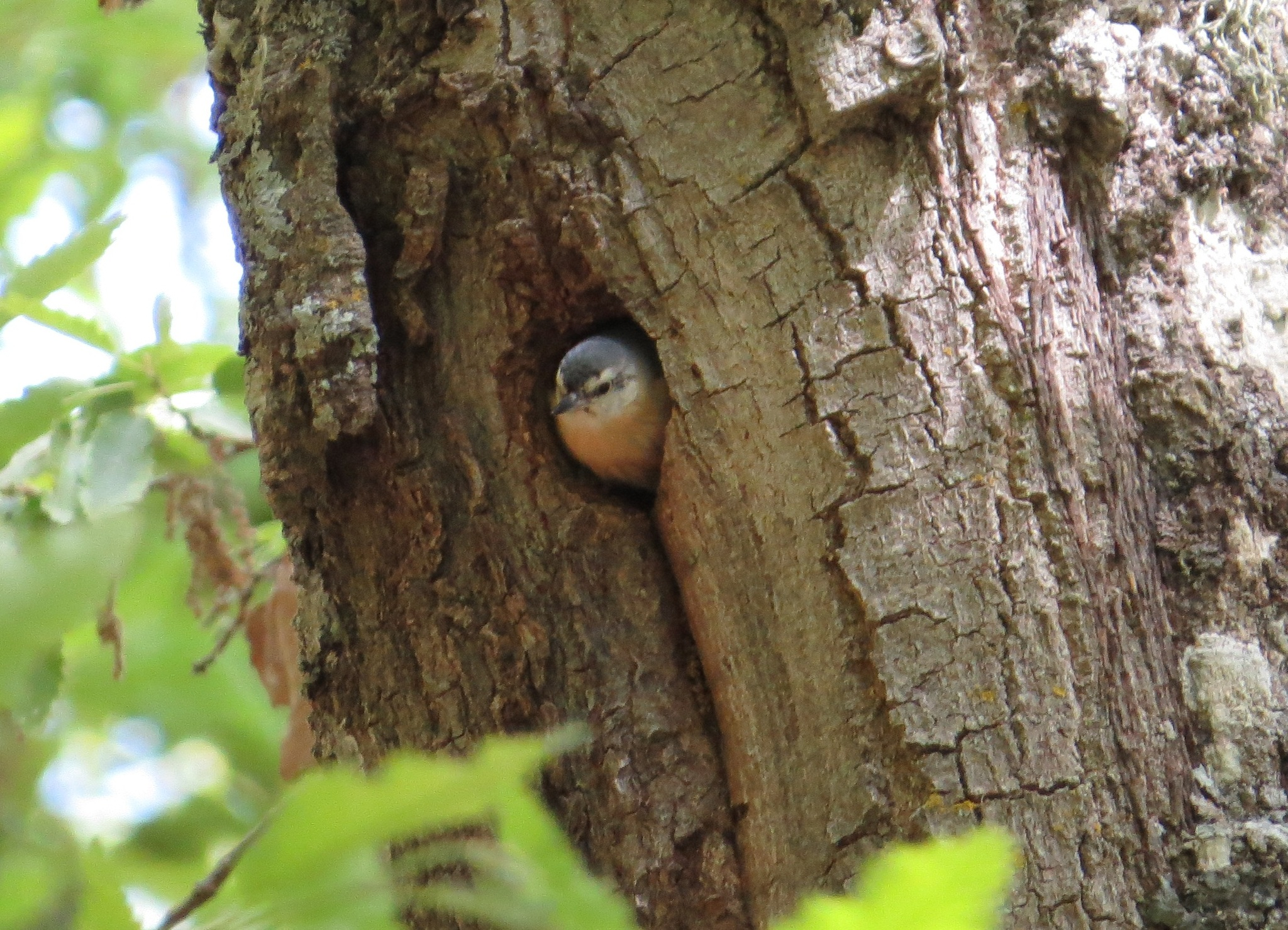
Algerian nuthatch at nest, in a tree cavity.

=== Breeding ===
The breeding season occurs from May to June in Tamentout and Mount Babor, earlier or later depending on weather conditions and food availability; at higher altitudes it may start later. In Taza National Park, the breeding season ends in late June. The nest is built in a tree hole, perhaps excavated by a great spotted woodpecker (Dendrocopos major), in a dead fir tree or in holes in an oak or cedar tree, and is usually placed between 4–15 m (13–49 ft) from the ground. The bottom is lined with plant debris (wood chips, dead leaves) or animal material such as western barn owl (Tyto alba) feathers or wild boar (Sus scrofa) hair. While incubation is carried out by the female alone (the male does not have a brood patch), both parents feed the young. Clutches have three or four fledglings. After the breeding season, adults undergo a full post-nuptial moult and young undergo a partial post-nuptial moult.

== Distribution and habitat ==
The Algerian nuthatch is the only bird endemic to Algeria. It inhabits certain areas of Kabylia, where it has been recorded in five localities isolated from each other by deforested areas unsuitable for its survival. It was first discovered on Mount Babor, only about 20 km^{2} (7.7 sq mi) from the Mediterranean coast. Its optimal habitat covers only 2.5 km^{2} (0.97 sq mi), and the area is home to only 80 pairs according to a 1985 estimate. Then in June 1989 it was found in Guerrouch, within the Taza National Park, which has a larger population of around 350 individuals. Smaller numbers were discovered in 1990 in two other localities near this park, in Tamentout and Djimla. In the spring of 2018, a new breeding site was discovered in Ghabet Ezzen, between the communes of Chahna and Oudjana in the Jijel province. On 24 September of the same year, two amateur ornithologists, Karim Haddad and Larbi Afoutni, went to the site; about twenty individuals were observed and photographed in the Lerabaa forest. The bird could be present in other oak groves of Petite Kabylie, but has not been documented yet.

The Algerian nuthatch lives in oak forests between 350 m (1,150 ft) and 1,120 m (3,670 ft) altitude and in mixed forests of oak, Italian maple (Acer opalus subsp. obtusatum), and mixed coniferous forests up to the 2,004 m (6,575 ft) summit of Jebel Babor. It appreciates humid forests with large trees offering cavities, including Algerian fir (Abies numidica), Atlas cedar (Cedrus atlantica), aspen (Populus tremula), Afares oak (Quercus afares), cork oak (Quercus suber) and Portuguese oak (Quercus faginea). The Babor Mountains, dominated by fir and cedar forest, offer a cool and humid climate, with snow up to 4 metres deep in winter and persisting until May; in the Guerrouch, oaks are dominant and the climate is warmer and drier. At lower altitudes, such as Tamentout, forests are dominated by cork oak, and stand densities are lower than at higher altitudes (above 1,000 m (3,300 ft)), where this species is replaced by deciduous oaks such as Algerian oak (Quercus canariensis) and Afares oak. A study conducted in Mount Babor between the summers of 1981 and 1982 showed that the factors apparently favourable to the Algerian nuthatch in this massif were "the diversity of tree species, the size (or age) of the trees and indirectly the climate at altitude".

== Status and threats ==
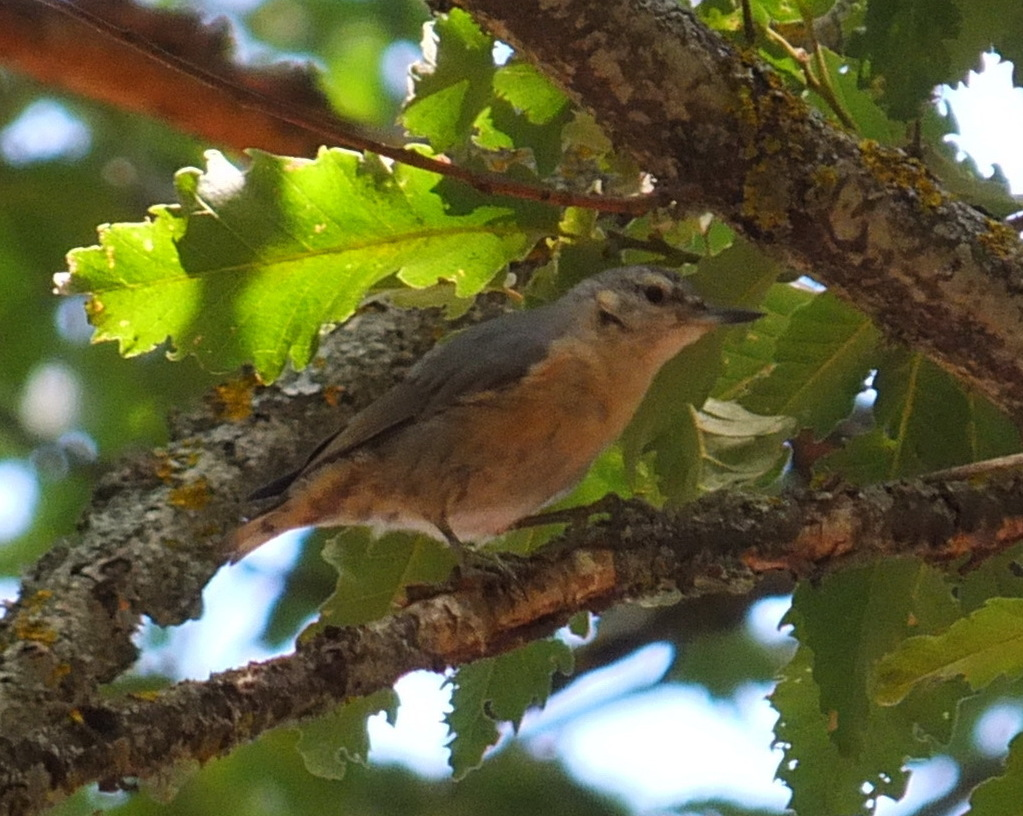
An individual photographed near Minar Zarza, in the southeast of the species' distribution.

=== Numbers and status ===
When the Algerian nuthatch was discovered, ornithologists estimated that the species numbered only a dozen pairs and it was feared that "its rarity would attract collectors" and that the announcement of its discovery would cause its disappearance. The discovery in 1989 of the much larger population of the park of Taza shows that the species is less threatened than it seemed, and that its endemism is not limited to Babor Mountains. The current distribution of the Algerian nuthatch seems to be limited by that of the forests that support it, and the fragmentation of populations may indicate that the species was once more widespread, before deforestation isolated it in the small islands of greenery that it populates today. The Algerian nuthatch has a small population: its numbers may not exceed 1,000 individuals. The bird is placed in the category of species with 250–999 mature individuals, which corresponds to 350–1,500 individuals in all. Although there are no precise figures to confirm this, these numbers are considered to be declining due to the reduction in habitat that the species is experiencing. The Algerian nuthatch has been considered "endangered" by the International Union for Conservation of Nature since 1994.

=== Threats ===
The main threat to the Algerian nuthatch is the destruction of its habitat. Fires, in particular, are destroying the old mixed forests on the top of Mount Babor, which are being replaced by poorer vegetation dominated by cedars. Cattle grazing and illegal deforestation (Mount Babor and Tamentout) are another threat to the habitat, even in Taza National Park. The construction of a motor road in the 1970s, which led to soil erosion and an increased risk of fire, or the fight against terrorism in the region, which is a source of disturbance for the species. The Algerian nuthatch may have several predators during incubation, such as the weasel (Mustela nivalis), the garden dormouse (Eliomys quercinus) and the great spotted woodpecker.

=== Protection ===
The species is protected in Algeria as one of 32 species listed in Decree No. 83-509 of 20 August 1983 on protected non-domestic animal species. The nuthatch was included in a 1980 petition by the BirdLife International requesting that the U.S. federal government add 60 foreign species to the federal endangered lists. This request was published in the official gazette of the United States. The petition was published in the Federal Register the following year, but these species, including the Algerian nuthatch, were not added to the endangered species lists until 1995.

The largest population is found in a protected area, the Taza National Park. To safeguard the species, it is important about the size of the existing populations and their ecological preferences. However, protective measures have already been put forward, including habitat restoration or preservation through reforestation, planting of firewood outside of existing forests, and fire prevention. The Algerian nuthatch is a flagship species for the preservation of the Babor Mountains forest.
