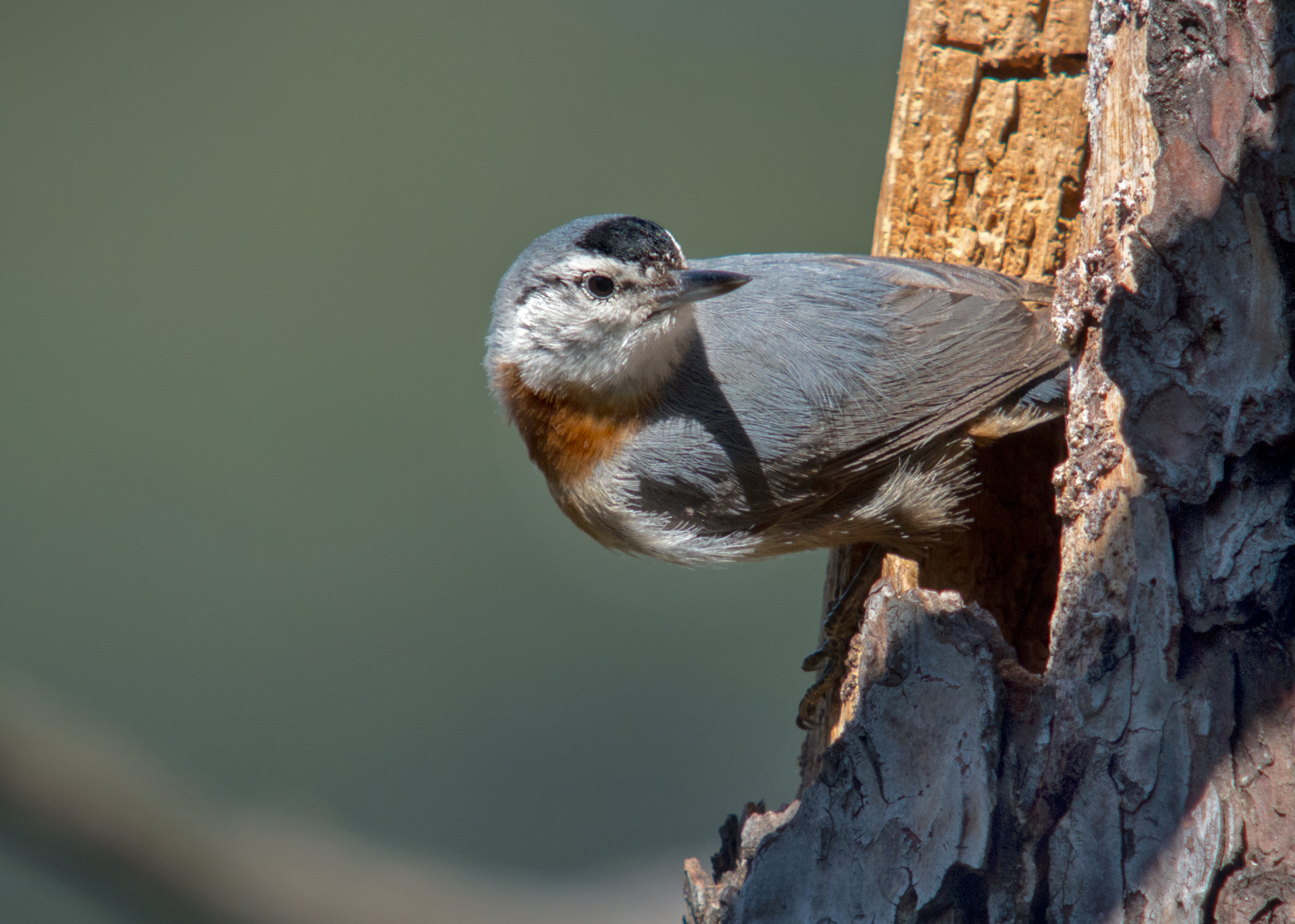
- Male in a pine forest on the island of Lesbos, Greece.

Conservation status
- Least Concern (IUCN 3.1)

Scientific classification
- Kingdom: Animalia
- Phylum: Chordata
- Class: Aves
- Order: Passeriformes
- Family: Sittidae
- Genus: Sitta
- Species: S. krueperi

Binomial name
- Sitta krueperi Pelzeln, 1863
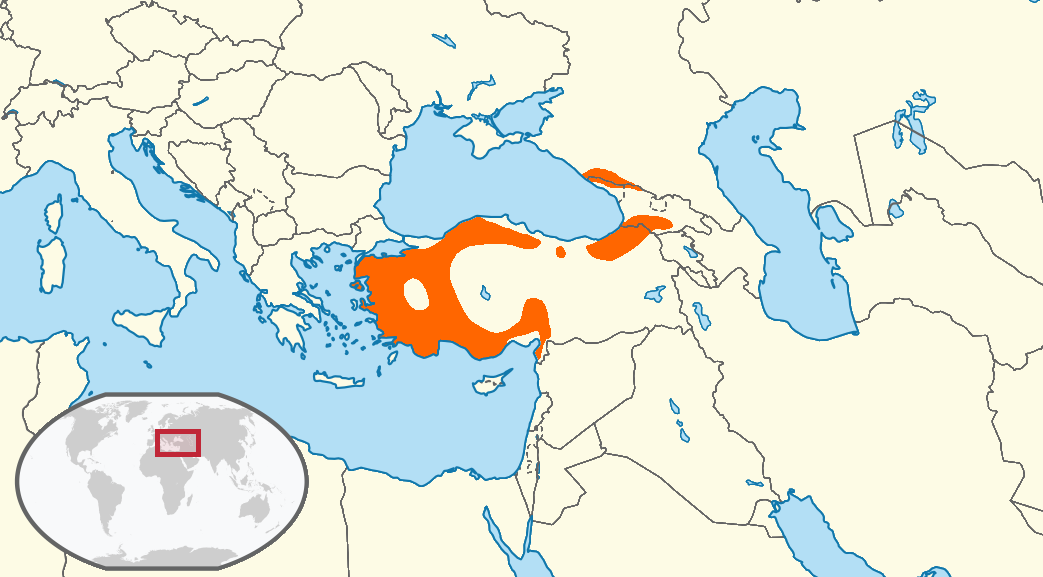
- Distribution of the Krüper's nuthatch

Synonyms
- • Sitta krüperi

= Krüper's nuthatch =

Species of bird

Krüper's nuthatch (Sitta krueperi) is a species of bird in the nuthatch family Sittidae. It is a small to medium-sized nuthatch, measuring 12.5 centimetres (4.9 in) in length. The upperparts are blue-grey, with the front half of the crown black in adults of both sexes, but with a less marked in the female rear. The species has a black or grey eyestripe and a prominent white supercilium. The underparts are blue-grey in males and buff-grey in females, with a large, crescent-shaped rufous pectoral patch. It feeds on insects in the summer and seeds, especially pine seeds, in autumn and winter. Breeding takes place between March and May, and the nest is usually placed in a tree hole. The clutch consists of five to seven eggs, incubated by the female and fed by the male. Both parents take part in feeding the young.

Krüper's nuthatch is found in pine and other coniferous forests in Turkey, Lesbos (Greece), and in the western Caucasus mountains in Georgia and Krasnodar Krai and Karachay-Cherkessia (southern Russia), largely following the distribution of Turkish pine (Pinus brutia). It is found from sea level up to 2,500 metres (8,200 ft) above sea level in places. This species is one of the small nuthatches of the "Sitta canadensis group" and is particularly very close to the Algerian nuthatch (S. ledanti), the only other species in which the black half-crown is found. Krüper's nuthatch is threatened by habitat loss caused by forestry and especially by tourist development on the Turkish coasts. Although its numbers are declining, the species is considered to be of "least concern" by the International Union for Conservation of Nature.

== Taxonomy ==
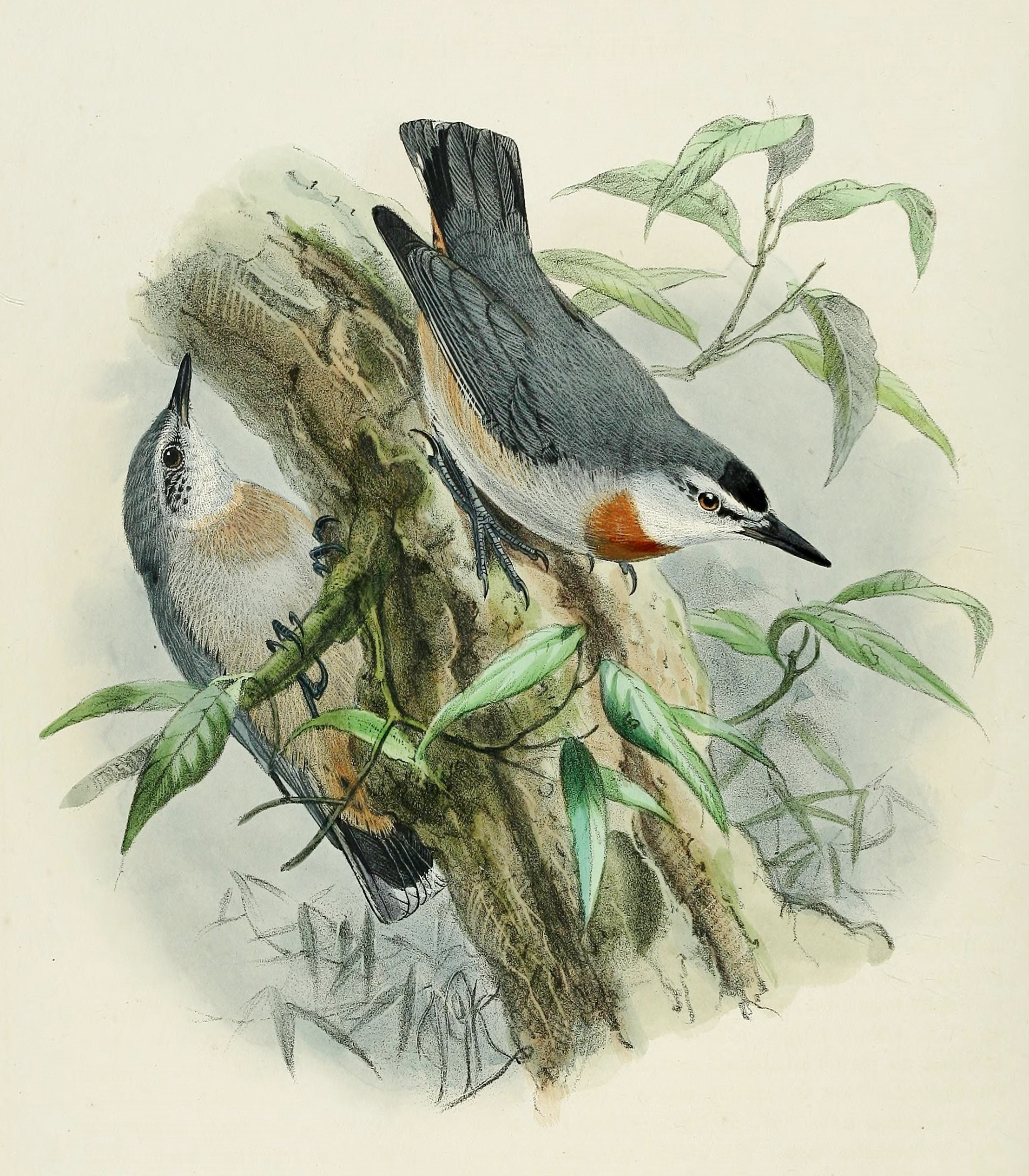
Illustrated by John Gould, showing a male Krüper's nuthatch on the right and a juvenile on the left.

The Krüper's nuthatch was described in 1863 by the Austrian ornithologist August von Pelzeln under the protonym Sitta krüperi, the type material collected at Smyrna (now İzmir), and naming the species after its discoverer, the German ornithologist Theobald Johannes Krüper. The International Ornithological Congress and Zoonomen checklists do not accept any subspecies.

=== Phylogeny ===
In 1975–1982 Hans Edmund Wolters proposed the division of the genus Sitta into subgenera, with Krüper's nuthatch placed in Sitta subgenus Mesositta (Buturlin, 1916), which also includes the Algerian nuthatch (S. ledanti), Yunnan nuthatch (S. yunnanensis), red-breasted nuthatch (S. canadensis), Chinese nuthatch (S. villosa) and Corsican nuthatch (S. whiteheadi). The Krüper's nuthatch belongs to the same species group as S. canadensis. It is most closely related to the Algerian nuthatch.

In 1998, Éric Pasquet studied the cytochrome b of the mitochondrial DNA of ten species of nuthatches, including the different species of the Sitta canadensis group, which he defined as six species, which are also sometimes treated as the subgenus Sitta subg. micrositta (Buturlin, 1916). The Yunnan nuthatch (S. yunnanensis) was not included in this study. Pasquet concludes that the Krüper's nuthatch is phylogenetically closest to the Algerian nuthatch, with both species forming the sister group of a clade that includes the Chinese nuthatch, the Corsican nuthatch, and the red-breasted nuthatch.

In 2014, Éric Pasquet and colleagues published a phylogeny based on nuclear and mitochondrial DNA from 21 species of nuthatches and confirmed the 1998 study's relationships within the S. canadensis group, adding the Yunnan nuthatch, which was found to be the most basal of the species. The conclusions of the study are in agreement with the morphology of the species, the red-breasted, Corsican, and Chinese nuthatches sharing, in particular as a derivative characteristic, the entirely black crown only present in males, a unique trait in Sittidae and related families. The second clade, grouping together Krüper's and Algerian nuthatches are thought to have the front of the black crown in males, this sexual dimorphism being absent in young individuals.

Phylogenetic tree detail
Nuthatch phylogenic detail according to Pasquet, et al. (2014):

- - Yunnan nuthatch (S. yunnanensis)
  - - - Red-breasted nuthatch (S. canadensis)
      - - Corsican nuthatch (S. whiteheadi)
        - Chinese nuthatch (S. villosa)
    - - Krüper's nuthatch (S. krueperi)
      - Algerian nuthatch (S. ledanti)

=== Phylogeography ===
A study on the phylogeography of the species was published in 2012, involving five sample sites in Turkey. The authors conclude that there are significant genetic diversities between the different localities, showing that the species occurred in at least three refuges during the last glaciation maximum. The southern populations are significantly different from the northern populations of the country, but the different northern populations have intensively mixed their genes after the glacial retreat, and have quite similar nuclear genetic material, although a marked geographical structure is observed by studying their mitochondrial genomes.

== Description ==
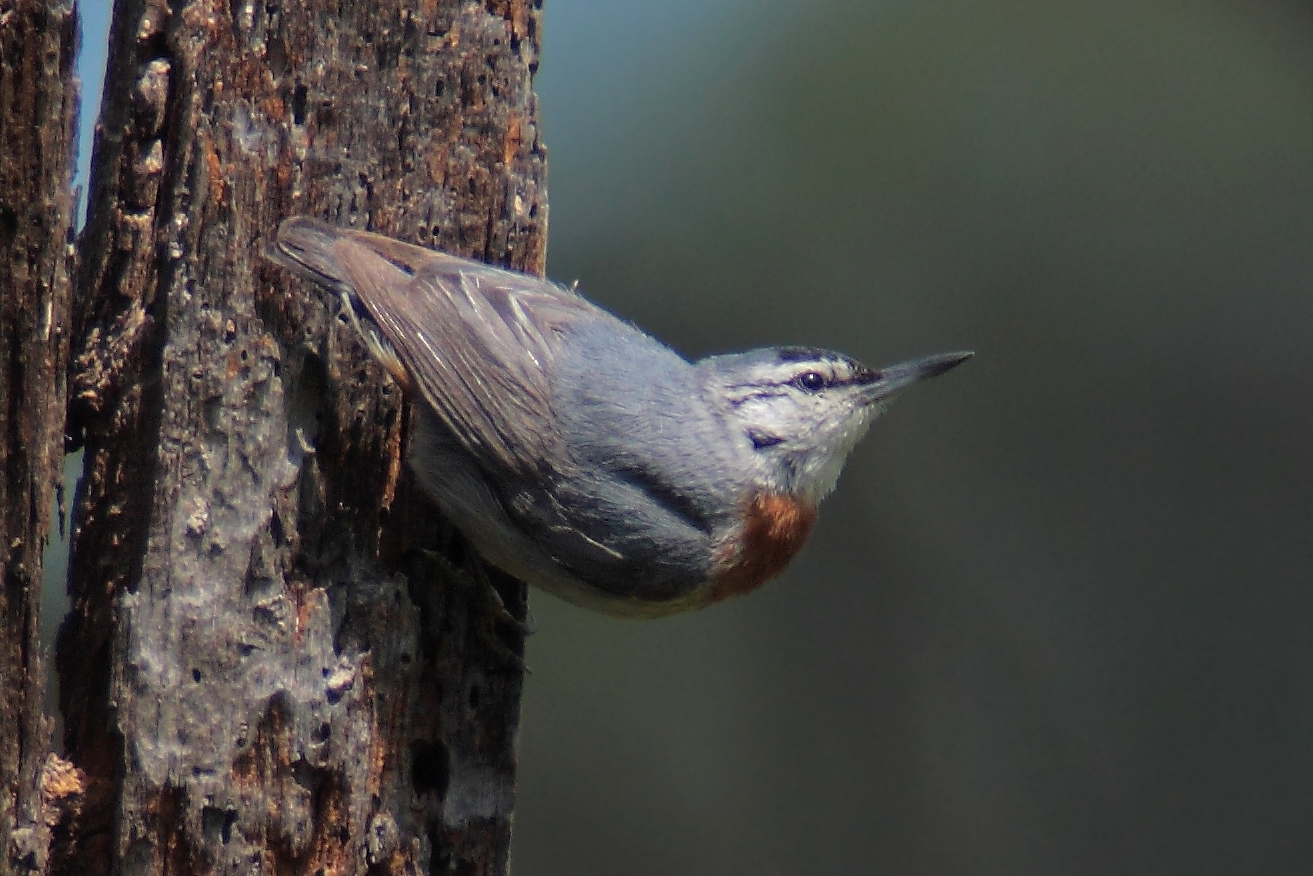
Male Krüper's nuthatch.

The Krüper's nuthatch is a small to medium-sized nuthatch, measuring 12.5 centimetres (4.9 in) in length. In males and females, the folded wing measures 71–81 millimetres (2.8–3.2 in) and 68–74 millimetres (2.7–2.9 in) respectively, the tail 33–40 millimetres (1.3–1.6 in) and 33–38 millimetres (1.3–1.5 in). The bill measures 17.9–20.2 millimetres (0.70–0.80 in) and the tarsus 16.9–19.3 millimetres (0.67–0.76 in). The adult male weighs 10–14.3 grams (0.35–0.50 oz). The study of 41 different measurements of many individuals across different localities in Turkey showed small variations in size along the range.

The upperparts are blue-grey with a black front crown in adults of both sexes, and the primary and secondary flight feathers are grey-brown. The supercilium is white and underlined by a black eyestripe that is a little less well defined behind the eye. The throat is white and the rest of the underparts are pale grey with a large reddish patch on the crescent-shaped breast. The underwing-coverts are off-white and the undertail is rufous, with white tips. The eye is surrounded by a thin white eye ring, and the iris is dark cinnamon or brown; the bill is dark horn-grey; the upper mandible cutting edge at the base is blue-grey, as is the entire lower mandible base. The legs are grey-brown or dark grey.

The sexual dimorphism is not very marked, especially in summer when the plumage is worn, but the female's crown is less black and less sharply defined at the back, whereas the male's crown is sharply defined in glossy black The female underparts are paler and buff, while the male is blue-grey to pale grey. The juvenile, on the other hand, is more easily distinguished, having much duller plumage and lacking the black crown; at most, the front of it is darker than the rest of the upperparts. Its russet pectoral patch is much less marked, as are the supercilium and the eyestripe. It can be distinguished from the adult female by its fresh plumage when the feathers of the latter are worn and its crown darker. Adults in their first year sometimes have some lingering brown on the feather tips of their greater coverts. Adults undergo a full post-nuptial moult (from mid-May to early September) and sometimes a partial moult before the breeding season (March), which particularly affects the chest. There is also a partial post-juvenile moult involving the middle coverts. While sharing the dark front of the crown and the marked white supercilium, the Algerian nuthatch has cream or buffy underparts and lacks the large russet-brown pectoral patch and undertail coverts. This patch is characteristic of the Krüper's nuthatch, as is the marked difference between adults and juveniles.

== Ecology and behaviour ==
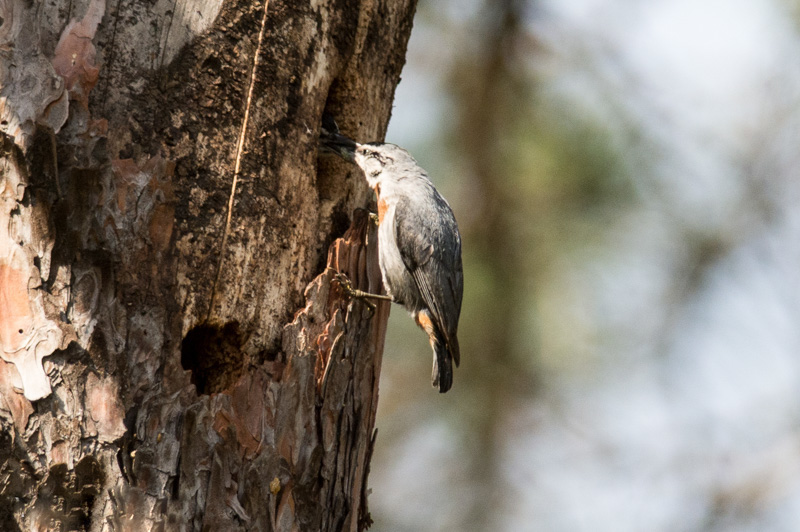
An adult feeding its incubating partner at the entrance to its nest.

The Krüper's nuthatch lives alone or in pairs during the breeding season, and the pair stays with their young. In autumn, it is observed in groups of two to five individuals, sometimes taking part in mixed-species foraging flocks.

=== Vocalisations ===
The Krüper's nuthatch is a noisy bird, and is often easily detected and identified by its calls. The contact call is a dvui, sometimes made in a dui-dui-dui-dui series and reminiscent of the European greenfinch (Chloris chloris). When agitated, it produces a rough èèhch reminiscent of the Eurasian jay (Garrulus glandarius) or a dry puik. The song is a "tutitutitutitutituti… nasal, alternating high and low notes", with variable rhythm between different song strophes.

=== Food ===
The Krüper's nuthatch is an active bird, and it finds its food among the smallest branches in the tops of large trees, but also in other levels of vegetation. It can forage in bushes, and even feed on the ground. It feeds mainly on insects during the breeding season, but when these become scarce, in autumn and winter, it consumes seeds of pine and other conifers. Insects are gleaned along branches, or caught in flight, and conifer seeds are extracted from cone scales with the bill, before being wedged into a crack in the bark and hammered open. Krüper's nuthatch also makes food caches that can be used when moisture closes the pine cones, making their seeds inaccessible, and the existence of these larders may explain the bird's territoriality, even outside the breeding season.

=== Breeding ===
The breeding season takes place from mid-March to mid-May in Turkey, the date depending on the location and altitude. In southern Anatolia, egg laying begins at the end of March; in the Caucasus, it takes place in April–May. There is only one brood per year. The nest is often placed in a hole, usually in a conifer, and high above the ground. A study conducted out over four breeding seasons in southern Turkey showed that nests were built to a height of nearly 12 m (470 in), with extremes between 2.1 m (83 in) and 24 m (940 in), and were often facing east. It usually uses already existing cavities that have been simply cleaned out, especially by the female, but can dig its own hole in dead trunks and branches. Eggs have been observed on the top of a stump or on a pile of twigs at the fork of a tree, but these unusual nesting sites may only be used when cavities are unavailable. The nest site is defended against competing hole-nesting species such as great tit Parus major and common redstart Phoenicurus phoenicurus, by both aggressive calling and pecking by the female.

Unlike some other nuthatches, the Krüper's nuthatch does not build the entrance to its hole with mud or resin. The bottom of the nest is lined with bark chips, rotten wood and pine cone scales, covered with moss, hair, wool, and feathers. The female does most of the work and lays four to seven eggs, usually five or six, measuring 17 mm × 13 mm (0.67 in × 0.51 in), creamy white with small red or purplish spots and speckles, mostly concentrated at the larger end. Incubation lasts 12 to 17 days and is performed by the female alone, fed by the male. The female also incubates the young, but both parents take part in the feeding. The young are mainly fed on beetles, insect larvae, lepidoptera, and earthworms. On average, four young are fledged at 15–19 days of age.

=== Parasites ===
In a Turkish study published in 2012, the Krüper's nuthatch was found to host blood protists of the genera Haemoproteus and Leucocytozoon, but none of the 67 individuals studied was parasitised by Plasmodium.

== Distribution and habitat ==
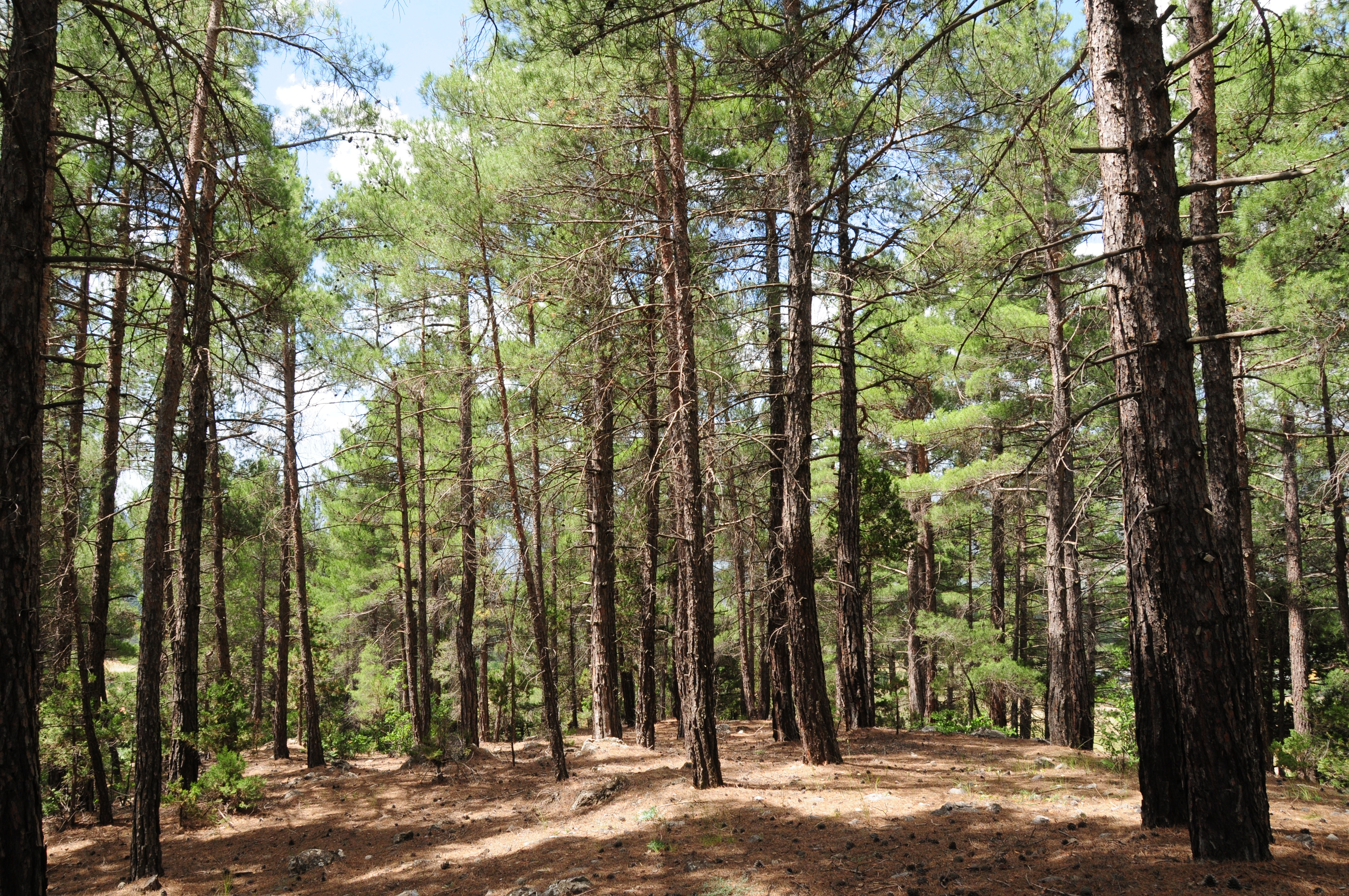
A forest of Turkish pine (Pinus brutia) in Pozantı, Turkey.

Krüper's nuthatch is found almost entirely in Turkey, where it is common in western Anatolia, and where it also lives along the Mediterranean coast in the Taurus Mountains and along the Black Sea coast north of the country, as far east as southern Georgia. It also lives on the Greek island of Lesbos and is vagrant in mainland Greece, where one was observed at Thessaloniki in October 1955. In 2010, a new nesting area was reported in central Anatolia, in Yozgat province, in the Ak Dağları mountains. This site consists of pure Scots pine (Pinus sylvestris) forest, and may support around 560 individuals.

Krüper's nuthatch has a very close relationship with the Turkish pine (Pinus brutia), and the range of the bird almost completely overlaps that of the tree. Outlying populations of Turkish pine in the Crimea, northwestern Syria, Lebanon, northern Iraq, and Azerbaijan, which are mostly small, may have once held Krüper's nuthatches, or may still hold undiscovered populations. Krüper's nuthatch is sedentary, but undertakes some dispersal after the breeding season. Seasonal altitudinal shifts have also been noted, with some birds, possibly bird in their first year, moving down from the high ground in winter to mixed or deciduous forests. The bird is then even commonly observed in the Sochi Arboretum, which has many conifers.

Krüper's nuthatch lives in temperate coniferous forests from sea level up to around 2,000 m altitude, locally to the tree line at 2,500 m. In Turkey, it lives mainly between 1,000 m and 1,600 m and inhabits the forests of Turkish pine, Caucasian spruce (Picea orientalis), Caucasian fir (Abies nordmanniana), Cilician fir (Abies cilicica), black pine (Pinus nigra) and Lebanon cedar (Cedrus libani). Population densities of 12.7, 11.6, 8.5, and 7.8 individuals per square kilometre have been measured in forests of black pine, Cilician fir, Lebanon cedar, and Turkish pine respectively. At higher altitudes, it can live among junipers (Juniperus). In the Caucasus, it prefers spruce forests between 1,000 m and 2,000 m, but also Caucasian fir and pine forests.

== Status and threats ==
The Krüper's nuthatch is common in Anatolia, but numbers are low in the Caucasus. On the island of Lesbos, populations are thought to be stable despite the destruction of old trees caused by commercial resin exploitation. Habitat modification due to fire and logging is causing a risk of extinction. In Turkey, a law promoting tourism put in place in 2003 has exacerbated threats to the bird; it reduces bureaucracy and makes it easier to build tourist facilities and summer houses in the coastal area where the bird was once abundant, and the loss of woodland is a growing problem for the nuthatch. In 2014, numbers were estimated at 80,000–170,000 breeding pairs, or 240,000–510,000 individuals in all, and are declining. For these reasons, the species was then considered "near threatened" by the International Union for the Conservation of Nature. In 2015, a new population assessment estimated the number of breeding pairs at 121,000-451,000, and although in continued decline, it was determined that the species is not losing more than a quarter of its numbers in three generations. For these reasons, the species was reassessed as "least concern".

== Footnotes ==
- fn. 1: Pelzeln originally published the name as "Sitta krüperi"; however, the use of the umlaut originating in a German name is to be treated as a correctable error (to be corrected from "ü" to "ue") by Article 32.5.2.1. of the International Code of Zoological Nomenclature.
- The 21 species are out of 24 species accepted as making up the genus by Simon Harrap and David Quinn as of 1996. Of these, the study omitted the Indian nuthatch (Sitta castanea), the yellow-billed nuthatch (Sitta solangiae) and the white-browed nuthatch (Sitta victoriae). The International Ornithological Congress however accepted 28 species in 2012, based on the elevation of four taxa from subspecies to full-species status, including Przevalski's nuthatch (S. przewalskii) and three species from the S. europaea group, and 29 species in 2021 with the split of the Bahama nuthatch (S. insularis) from Brown-headed nuthatch (S. pusilla) in 2020.
