= Hans Löhrl =

Hans Löhrl (25 May 1911 – 26 June 2001) was a German ornithologist and ethologist who conducted studies on bird behaviour, life-history, the imprinting of natal habitat, and wrote several popular books on bird life.

Löhrl was born in Stuttgart and studied biology and geology at the University of Tübingen and received a PhD from the Ludwig-Maximilians-Universität München for studies on rodents. He then worked at the Rossitten and Radolfzell bird observatories, heading the latter from 1963 until his retirement in 1976. Löhrl was skilled at raising young birds and his home often had free flying birds of a number of species that he studied at close quarters. These included studies on cuckoos, nuthatches, and tree creepers which are considered hard to raise in captivity. In the 1950s he was influenced by Gustav Kramer to examine how collared flycatchers were able to learn what their home-grounds where and noted that this imprinting required the young birds to fly and explore the habitats in which they grew up. He also examined problems of clutch size in terms of the last or weakest nestling. He coined the term nachstürzen (or diving after) as a reflex action among insectivorous birds for whom chasing fallen or escaping prey was energetically less demanding than searching afresh for prey.
