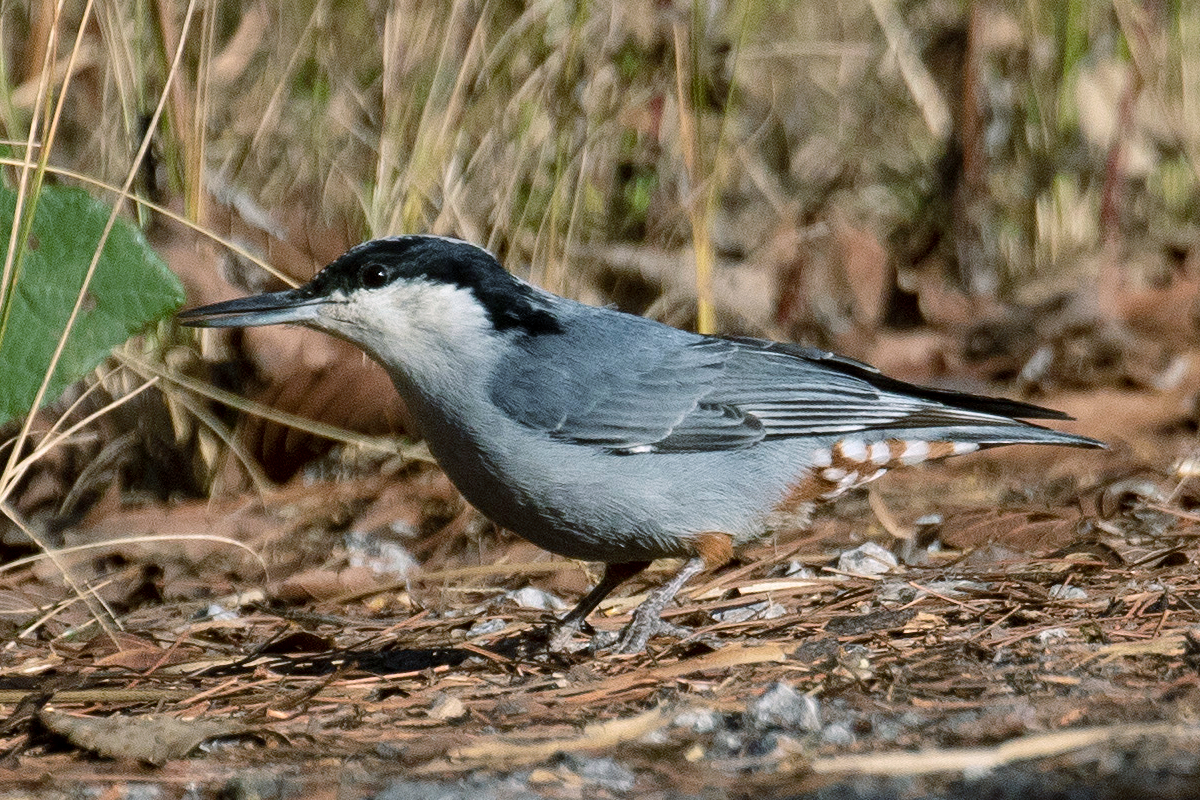
- An individual of the nominate subspecies, Sitta magna magna, on the ground in Thailand.

Conservation status
- Endangered (IUCN 3.1)

Scientific classification
- Kingdom: Animalia
- Phylum: Chordata
- Class: Aves
- Order: Passeriformes
- Family: Sittidae
- Genus: Sitta
- Species: S. magna

Binomial name
- Sitta magna Wardlaw-Ramsay, 1876
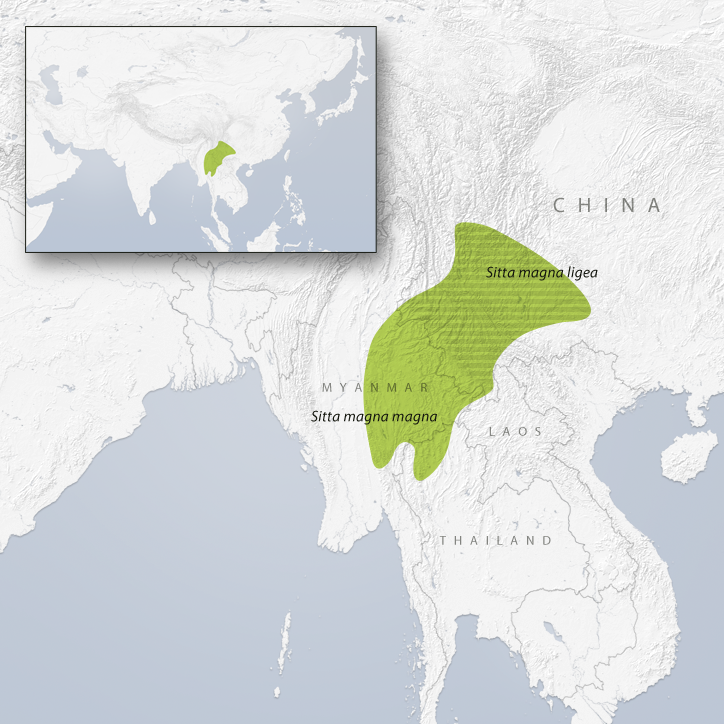
- Distribution of the giant nuthatch

= Giant nuthatch =

Species of bird

The giant nuthatch (Sitta magna) is a species of bird in the family Sittidae. It is the longest of the nuthatches, measuring 19.5 cm (7.7 in) in length. Its upperparts are bluish grey, with the front (from crown to upper back) being light grey, contrasting with the darker rest of the back. The bird has two very thick black eyebrow lines and light grey underparts, with whitish cheeks and throat, and a belly more or less washed with buff and cinnamon. For a nuthatch, it has a long beak and tail. The female can be distinguished from the male by its duller eye features and its upperparts having less contrast between the crown, nape, and lower back. The calls are powerful and made up of repetitions of simple patterns. The species gleans its food from the trunks and branches of trees, especially pines, and feeds on insects and berries. It nests around March, in the hole of a tree and without masking the entrance, and the nest has about three young.

The giant nuthatch is distributed from southwest China to east-central Myanmar, northwest Thailand, and probably to the far northwest of Laos. Its altitudinal distribution varies by region, but ranges from around 1,000 m (3,280 ft) up to at least 3,350 m (10,990 ft) in China. It forages in pine stands, in particular old Pinus kesiya (Khasi pine), present on mountain ridges, among the oak-chestnut groves. Two subspecies are distinguished, S. m. magna and S. m. ligea, differing mainly in length and width of the beak. The giant nuthatch is threatened by the destruction of its habitat, and is very local in occurrence. The population is difficult to assess and seems to have been overestimated, so in 2013 the International Union for Conservation of Nature changed its status from "vulnerable" to "endangered".

== Taxonomy ==
The giant nuthatch was described in 1876 under its current binomial name Sitta magna by the British naturalist Robert Ramsay. Hans Edmund Wolters proposed the division of the genus Sitta into subgenera in 1975–1982; in this, the giant nuthatch is placed in Sitta subgenus Sitta (Linnaeus, 1758). According to the International Ornithological Congress and Alan P. Peterson, there are two subspecies.

- S. m. ligea (Deignan, 1938), described by the American ornithologist Herbert Girton Deignan in 1938 from an adult male collected in Lijiang, is distributed over south-central China.
- S. m. magna (Ramsay, 1876), the nominate subspecies, is described from type material from Kayah State (Myanmar), central Myanmar, southern China and northwest Thailand.

S. m. ligea has a bill that is on average 4 mm shorter and laterally more slender than the nominate subspecies, but the two subspecies probably intergrade in Yunnan.

The relationships of this species to other nuthatches have long remained unclear. Harrap proposed to link the giant nuthatch to the Eurasian nuthatch (S. europaea) and its Palearctic species complex. In 2014, Éric Pasquet and colleagues published a phylogeny based on nuclear and mitochondrial DNA from 21 species of nuthatches. The giant nuthatch is then related to the white-breasted nuthatch (S. carolinensis), whereas the latter species was previously related, by morphological characters, to the Przevalski's nuthatch (S. przewalskii), which, however, appears to be completely basal in the genus Sitta.

The simplified cladogram below is based on the phylogenetic analysis of Packert and colleagues (2014):

- - Przevalski's nuthatch (Sitta przewalskii)
  - White-cheeked nuthatch (Sitta leucopsis)
- - - Giant nuthatch (Sitta magna)
    - White-breasted nuthatch (Sitta carolinensis)

== Description ==
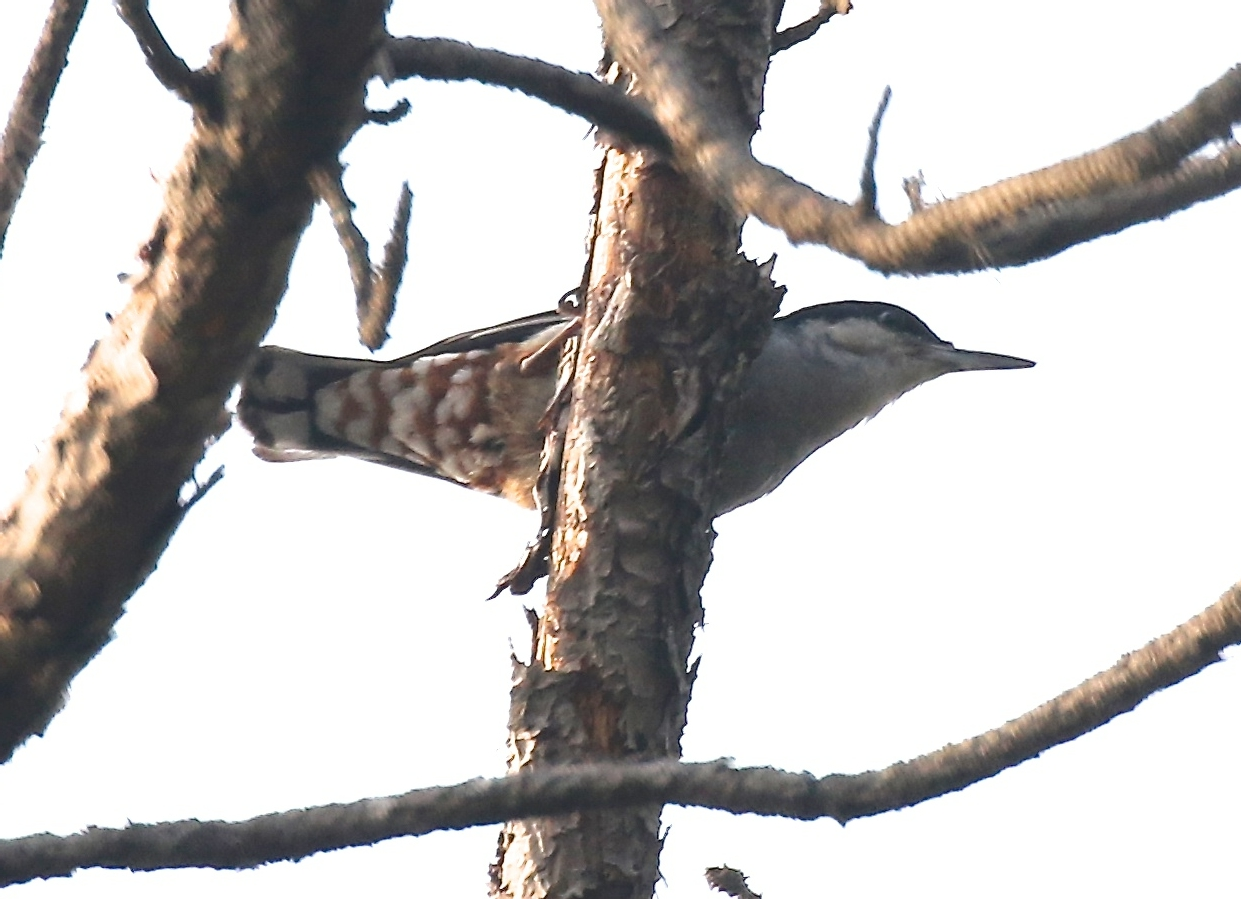
A giant nuthatch in Doi Ang Khang, showing its undertail largely spotted with white.

The upperparts are dark bluish-grey, with the crown, nape, and upper mantle much lighter grey and somewhat streaked with black, varyingly between individuals, regardless of sex. The crown is framed by two thick black eyestripes that extend to the top of the mantle; in profile, the bird can even give the impression of having a black head. The underparts are light grey, with almost white cheeks and throat, and the belly is more or less washed with cinnamon. The undertail coverts are rufous, with large white spots. The iris is brown or hazel, the bill is black, with half of the lower mandible lighter, bluish white or bluish lilac. Feet and toes are greyish slate, greenish brown or light yellowish brown, with horn-coloured, dark brown or greyish slate claws.

There is slight sexual dimorphism; the male has a deep black eyestripe (faintly glossed blue) and off-white cheeks and throat, with the remainder of the underparts pale to light grey with a slight buff tinge on the centre of the belly and vent. The upperparts of the female also differ somewhat from those of the male: the nape of the neck and the top of the mantle are lightly tinged with buff, and the bottom of the mantle is lighter than in the male, providing less contrast with the nape. The juvenile resembles the females, but has the crown mealy, the upper parts are more grey than blue, and the eye features are duller. It has warm brown fringes on the tertials and greater coverts, and the flight feathers are fresh when those of an adult are worn out from moulting. Adults go through a full moult after the breeding season in early May, and a partial moult (especially of the throat and nape) before the breeding season in November–December.

The giant nuthatch is the longest of the nuthatches, measuring 19.5 cm (7.7 in) in length, though at 36–47 g weight, it is not as heavy as the 42.7–55 g eastern rock nuthatch. Its large size makes the giant nuthatch quite distinctive, but in cases where this is not obvious, there may be a risk of confusion with the chestnut-vented nuthatch (Sitta nagaensis), which however has reddish flanks, much smaller black eyestripe, and does not have its crown and upper mantle lighter than the rest of the upper parts. The Yunnan nuthatch (S. yunnanensis) can occur in the same habitats as the Giant Nuthatch in southern Yunnan, but is much smaller, with a white eyebrow.

== Ecology and behaviour ==
=== Vocal behaviour ===
The giant nuthatch has a sonorous voice. It often emits a calling cry, reminiscent of corvids and in particular the chattering of the Eurasian magpie (Pica pica), that consists of three rough notes repeated quickly, variously transcribed in English literature as gd-da-da, dig-er-up or get-it-up. Sometimes this chatter is more elaborate and melodic, becoming a series of motifs in kid-der-ku or ge-de-ku, in which the first notes remain dry but where the final note is strong and tingling. The notes can also be rougher, becoming a repeated gu-drr, gu-drr, gu-drr, reminiscent of the call of some game birds. The giant nuthatch also has a naa call reminiscent of the sound of a child's trumpet. The song could be a clear, whistling or tinkling sound in kip or keep, repeated at irregular intervals and reminiscent of the song, but louder, of a tree frog.

=== Behaviour and diet ===
The giant nuthatch prospers like most other nuthatches, particularly frequently putting itself upside down, but it is generally less agitated than the smaller species of the genus. It usually flies straight over short distances, with whirring wingbeats, and its broad butterfly-like wings are visible as it drops from one branch to another. Over longer distances, it has a drooping flight, reminiscent of a woodpecker. This nuthatch usually searches alone or in pairs, usually in pines. It usually explores the trunk and large branches, but it has also been observed foraging on thinner branches for insects. The study of stomach contents showed that the diet consisted of berries and arthropods, such as beetles, lepidoptera and ants.

=== Breeding ===
The data on its reproduction is very fragmentary. On 4 April 1933, a nest was found in southern Shan State with three young, half-feathered. It was located in a naturally occurring hole in the trunk of a tree, with the opening facing the sky, more than 2 m above the ground, and not bricked with mud as other nuthatches do. On 8 April 1983, another nest containing 3 hatchlings was found in north-western Thailand. It was located in a hollow oak about 8 m tall and 25 cm thick, with the nest entrance about 3 m off the ground. In 1998, another nest was reported in Thailand, found at the end of March in the trunk of a Benguet pine and containing hatchling.

== Distribution and habitat ==
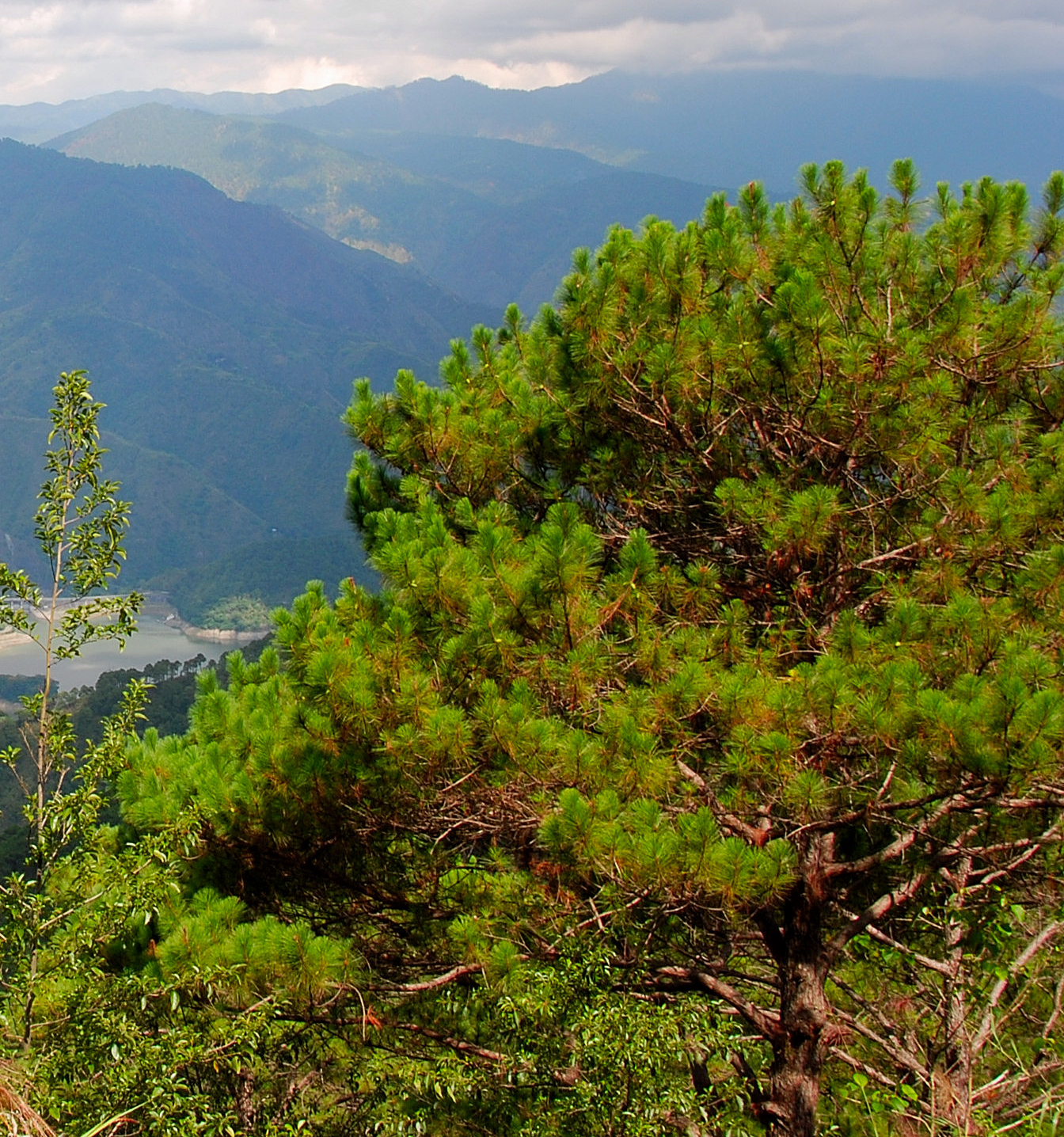
The Khasi pine (Pinus kesiya) is often used by the giant nuthatch, both for food and for nesting.

The giant nuthatch mainly appreciates pine forests, but can also be found in more open environments, foraging for food from one small tree to another. In Thailand, it is found in the middle of oak and chestnut forests, among which mature large Benguet pine are frequent on the ridge tops. It lives at medium to high altitudes: in China, it generally inhabits forests well above 1,000 m (3,280 ft), up to at least 3,350 m (10,990 ft); in Myanmar, it is reported from 1,220 m (4,000 ft) to 1,830 m (6,000 ft), and in Thailand from 1,200 m (3,940 ft) to 1,800 m (5,910 ft).

The giant nuthatch lives from south-central China to northwestern Thailand. In China, it is found in the north, in southern Sichuan and Guizhou (in Xingyi, in particular). Further south, the species lives in a large part of Yunnan, from Mount Yulong and Lijiang in the north, in the Autonomous Prefecture of Dali Bai, the xian of Shuangbai and Mile, and until the Dai Autonomous Prefecture of Xishuangbanna in the south. In Myanmar, it inhabits a large part of Shan State, and its distribution ends in the northwest at the Mogok Hills of the Mandalay region, in the central-west around Myinkyado, and in the south at Mount Nat Taung. Reports have nevertheless become rarer since 1950, and the distribution of the species in this country may have been reduced. It is probably present in the extreme northwest of Laos since it is found in neighboring Myanmar and Yunnan; in 2013, searches carried out in the habitats most likely to host the species would have been unsuccessful. It finally lives in the northwest of Thailand, and has been reported in particular in the Doi Ang Khang, Doi Pha Hom Pok, Doi Chiang Dao, Doi Khun Tan mountains, Lum Nam Pai wildlife sanctuary, and at Mae Hong Son. It was reported in Doi Inthanon in the early 1980s, but it could be a confusion with the chestnut-vented nuthatch (S. nagaensis) since the large pine forests to which the species seems so related do not exist on this mountain. It apparently disappeared from Doi Suthep-Pui National Park in Thailand, where it was present in the 1960s.

== Conservation and threats ==
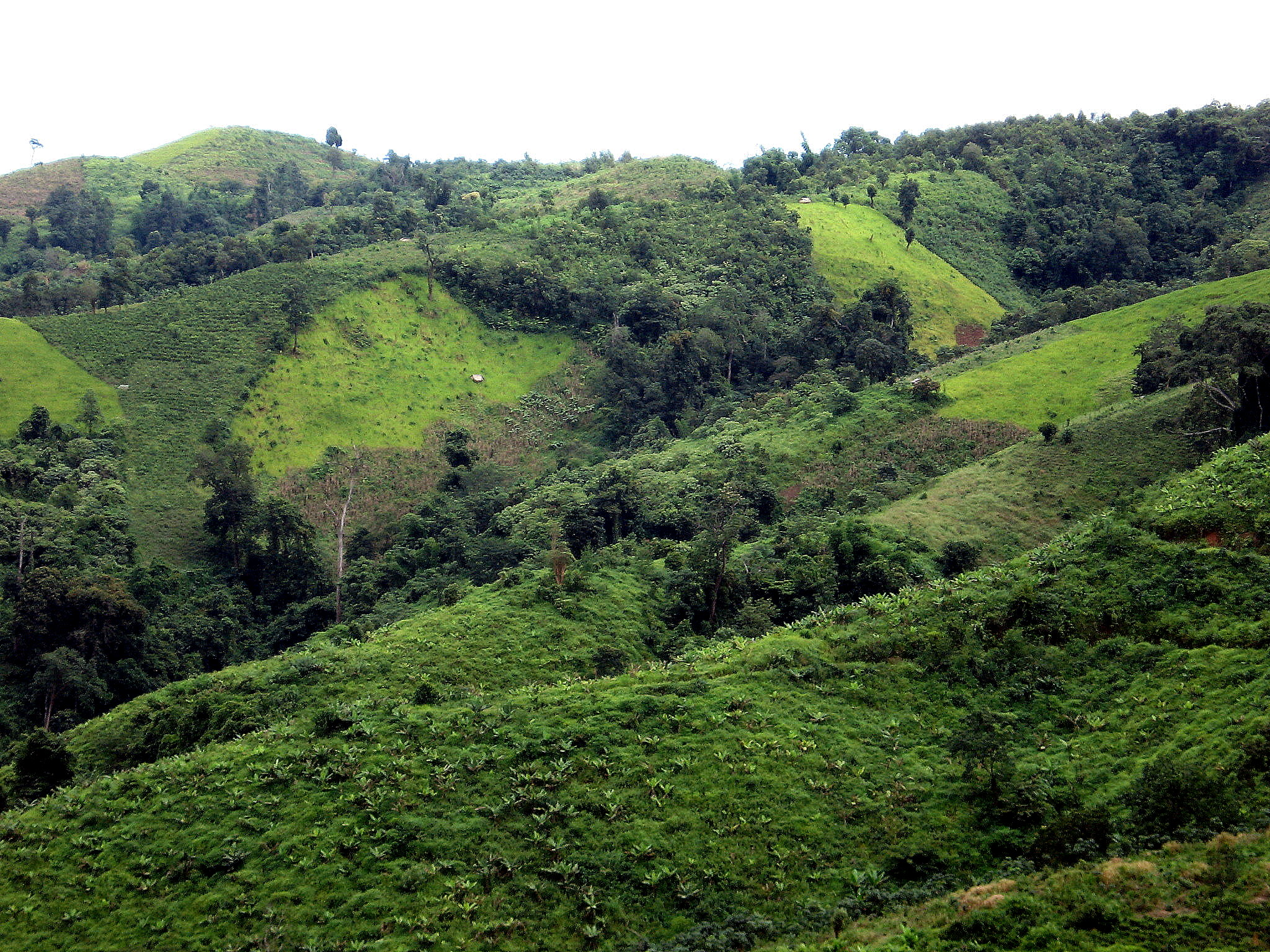
In Yunnan, as elsewhere, mature forests are felled for agriculture.

The species has been described as "not rare" in Myanmar, but records have declined since 1950, which may indicate a declining range. The giant nuthatch is rare in China, with declining populations, but fairly established in Yunnan. Massive logging has been banned from most forests, but logging for pine resin and firewood remains a major cause of the destruction of old trees. In Thailand, it is uncommon and local. It is found in this country below 1,800 m (5,910 ft), where most of its habitat is subject to destruction for cultivation and for firewood, the pines being mainly targeted. The giant nuthatch has been seen in live animal markets before, but poaching is likely a marginal threat. On the other hand, the four years of drought that Yunnan experienced before 2013 are likely to have reduced the reproductive success of the species.

There are 800–2,000 mature individuals in Yunnan, which accounts for the majority of records, with only 6–50 mature individuals in the largest subpopulation. The global population comprises 1,500–3,800 individuals in total, of which 1,000–2,499 individuals are mature. The species was considered in 2012 as "vulnerable" by the International Union for the Conservation of Nature, but it appeared that its numbers were even lower than previously estimated, and in 2013, the giant nuthatch was considered "endangered". In addition, populations are probably declining and becoming increasingly fragmented. A 2009 study tried to predict the impact that climate change could have on the distribution of several species of nuthatches in Asia by modeling two scenarios; the giant nuthatch could see its distribution decreased from 18.0 to 24.0% by the years 2040 to 2069.

The species is present in many protected areas in China and Thailand, and a public awareness program was set up in Yunnan in 2007. BirdLife International proposes further study of the exact distribution of the giant nuthatch, its numbers, and its habitat in order to better protect the species. The protection of the latter is particularly important, and it is necessary to establish protected areas among healthy pine stands and control their exploitation.

== Bibliography ==
Harrap, Simon (1996). Tits, Nuthatches & Treecreepers. Illustrated by David Quinn. London: Christopher Helm. ISBN 0-7136-3964-4.
