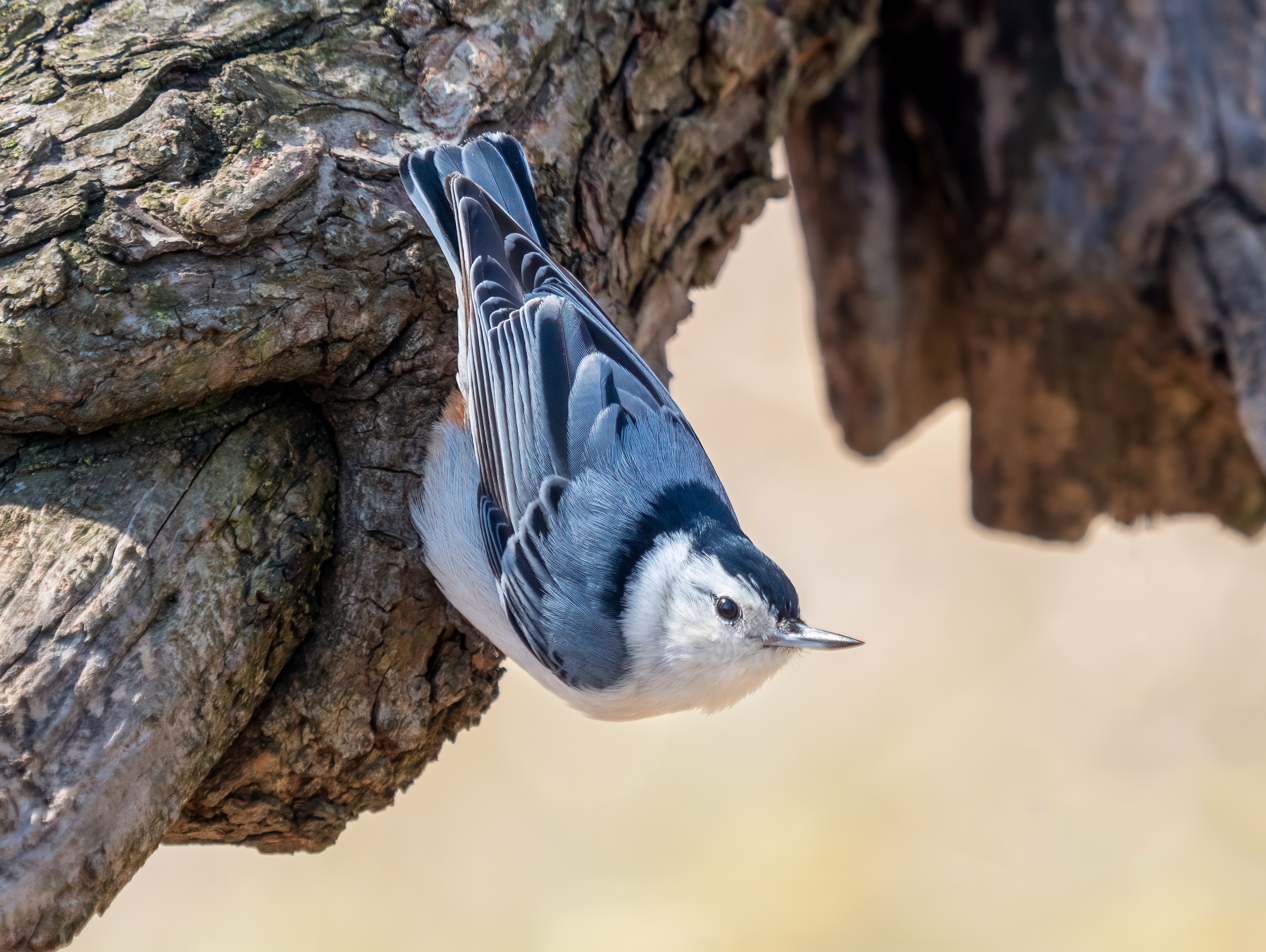
- Adult male S. c. carolinensis

Conservation status
- Least Concern (IUCN 3.1)

Scientific classification
- Kingdom: Animalia
- Phylum: Chordata
- Class: Aves
- Order: Passeriformes
- Family: Sittidae
- Genus: Sitta
- Species: S. carolinensis

Binomial name
- Sitta carolinensis Latham, 1790
- Approximate distribution map Year-round Nonbreeding

Audio
- Song of an individual from Wilkes County, North Carolina, US

= White-breasted nuthatch =

Species of bird

The white-breasted nuthatch (Sitta carolinensis) is a species of bird in the nuthatch family Sittidae. It is a medium-sized nuthatch, measuring approximately 15.5 cm (6.1 in) in length. Coloration varies somewhat along the species' range, but the upperparts are light blue-gray, with a black crown and nape in males, while females have a dark gray crown. The underparts are whitish, with a reddish tinge on the lower abdomen. Despite not being closely related, the white-breasted nuthatch and the white wagtail are very similar in plumage.

The white-breasted nuthatch is a chatty bird. It has a nasal voice and often utters little cries or vocalizations, often composed of repetitions of small invariant whistles. In summer, it is an exclusively insectivorous bird, consuming a wide range of arthropods, but in winter its diet consists mainly of seeds. The nest is located in the cavity of a tree. The clutch consists of five to nine eggs, incubated for two weeks by the female, who is fed by the male. The two adults then feed the young until they fledge, and for a few weeks after that.

The white-breasted nuthatch breeds throughout much of North America, except in the cooler and drier areas. It is mainly found at low elevations, in deciduous forests or in mixed woodlands. Seven to nine subspecies are generally distinguished by their slightly distinct distributions, vocalizations, and coloration. The species was once thought to be related to the white-cheeked nuthatch (S leucopsis) and Przewalski's nuthatch (S. przewalskii), two species from southern Asia, but is actually more closely related to the giant nuthatch (S. magna), also from Southeast Asia.

== Taxonomy ==
The nuthatches are a genus, Sitta, of small passerine birds which derive their English name from the tendency of some species to wedge large insects or seeds into cracks, and then hack at them with their strong bills. Sitta is derived from sittē, Ancient Greek for nuthatch, and carolinensis means "of Carolina" in Latin. The white-breasted nuthatch was first described by English ornithologist John Latham in his 1790 work, the Index Ornithologicus. German ornithologist Hans Edmund Wolters proposed the division of the genus Sitta into subgenera in 1975–1982. The white-breasted nuthatch is placed in Sitta (Leptositta) (Buturlin, 1916), alongside the white-cheeked nuthatch (S. leucopsis) and Przewalski's nuthatch (S. przewalskii).

Nuthatch taxonomy is complex, with geographically separated species sometimes closely resembling each other. In appearance, the white-breasted nuthatch is similar to the white-cheeked nuthatch of the Himalayas, and was historically sometimes even considered to be conspecific with it. A study published in 2012 showed that four distinct lineages were genetically isolated from each other and could represent different species, recognizable by morphology and song. Molecular phylogenies published in 2014 and 2020 and including all main species' lineages within nuthatches concluded that the white-breasted nuthatch was more closely related to the giant nuthatch (S. magna) than to either white-cheeked or Przewalski's nuthatches; these latter two turned out to be basal in the family.

The simplified cladogram below is based on the phylogenetic analysis by Päckert and colleagues (2020):

- - Przevalski's nuthatch (Sitta przewalskii)
  - White-cheeked nuthatch (Sitta leucopsis)
- - - Giant nuthatch (Sitta magna)
    - White-breasted nuthatch (Sitta carolinensis)
  - - All other nuthatches

== Description ==
The white-breasted nuthatch is a medium-sized nuthatch, measuring about 15.5 cm (6.1 in) in length. Like other members of its genus, it has a large head, short tail, short wings, a powerful bill and strong feet; it is 13–14 cm (5.1–5.5 in) long, with a wingspan of 20–27 cm (7.9–10.6 in) and a weight of 18–30 g (0.63–1.06 oz).

The adult male of the nominate subspecies, S. c. carolinensis, has pale blue-gray upperparts, a glossy black cap (crown of the head), and a black band on the upper back. The wing coverts and flight feathers are very dark gray with paler fringes, and the closed wing is pale gray and black, with a thin white wing bar. The face and the underparts are white. The outer tail feathers are black with broad diagonal white bands across the outer three feathers, a feature readily visible in flight.

The female has, on average, a narrower black back band, slightly duller upperparts and buffer underparts than the male. Her cap may be gray, but many females have black caps and cannot be reliably distinguished from the male in the field. In the northeastern United States, at least 10% of females have black caps, but the proportion rises to 40–80% in the Rocky Mountains, Mexico and the southeastern U.S. Juveniles are similar to the adult, but duller plumaged.

Three other, significantly smaller, nuthatches have ranges which overlap that of white-breasted, but none has white plumage completely surrounding the eye. Further distinctions are that the red-breasted nuthatch has a black eye line and reddish underparts, and the brown-headed and pygmy nuthatches each have a brown cap, and a white patch on the nape of the neck.

=== Geographical variation ===
The white-breasted nuthatch currently has seven accepted subspecies, although the differences are small and change gradually across the range. The subspecies are treated in two to four groups based on close similarities in morphology, habitat usage, and vocalizations. These groups cover eastern North America, the Great Basin and central Mexico, and the Pacific coastal regions. A proposal was made to the American Ornithologists Union in 2013 to split these groups into two, three, or four separate species; this was not passed due to insufficient evidence, but with an expectation to revisit the status when further evidence becomes available. The subspecies of the western interior have the darkest upperparts but a narrower dark crown above the white cheeks, and eastern S. c. carolinensis has the palest back, but a broader dark crown above the cheeks. The eastern form also has a thicker bill than the interior and Pacific races. The calls of the three groups differ, as described above. The exact boundaries of the subspecies within California was examined in a 2017 paper, revising the previously believed boundaries.

Subspecies	Image	Range	Appearance
S. c. carolinensis	Algonquin Provincial Park, Ontario	Nominate subspecies, northeast North America west to Saskatchewan and eastern Texas	Palest back and cap
S. c. nelsoni	Edmonton, Alberta	Rocky Mountains, from southern Alberta south to northwest Chihuahua, southwest Texas and eastern Mexico	Darker gray upperparts, darker cap, less contrast in wings; includes S. c. oberholseri
S. c. tenuissima	Fort Rock, central Oregon	From British Columbia through the Cascade Range to southern California in the Sierra Nevada at higher altitudes	Smaller than S. c. nelsoni, with slightly paler upperparts and a more slender bill
S. c. aculeata	Groveland, Central Valley, California	Western parts of Washington, Oregon and California, west of the Cascades and Sierra Nevada, at lower altitudes	Smaller than S. c. tenuissima, with buffer underparts, slightly paler upperparts and a more slender bill
S. c. alexandrae	Sierra de San Pedro Mártir, Baja California	Northern Baja California	Larger than S. c. aculeata, with marginally darker upperparts; the longest-billed race
S. c. lagunae	Sierra La Laguna, Baja California Sur	Southernmost Baja California Sur	Smaller than S. c. alexandrae with slightly darker; underparts and more buff; bill relatively stout
S. c. mexicana	Namiquipa, Chihuahua	Western and southern Mexico	Duller than S. c. nelsoni with grayer flanks; short, stout bill; includes S. c. kinneari

=== Similar species ===
Only three other species of nuthatches inhabit North America, the red-breasted nuthatch (S. canadensis), the pygmy nuthatch (S. pygmaea) and the brown-headed nuthatch (S. pusilla); their distributions all overlap with those of the white-breasted nuthatch. They are, however, clearly distinct and much smaller, since they are the smallest nuthatches, measuring 10 centimeters long and weighing around 10 grams. The red-breasted nuthatch has reddish underparts and has a black stripe on the eye. The pygmy nuthatch and the brown-headed nuthatch have a brown crown with a white spot on the nape.

Nuthatches of North America

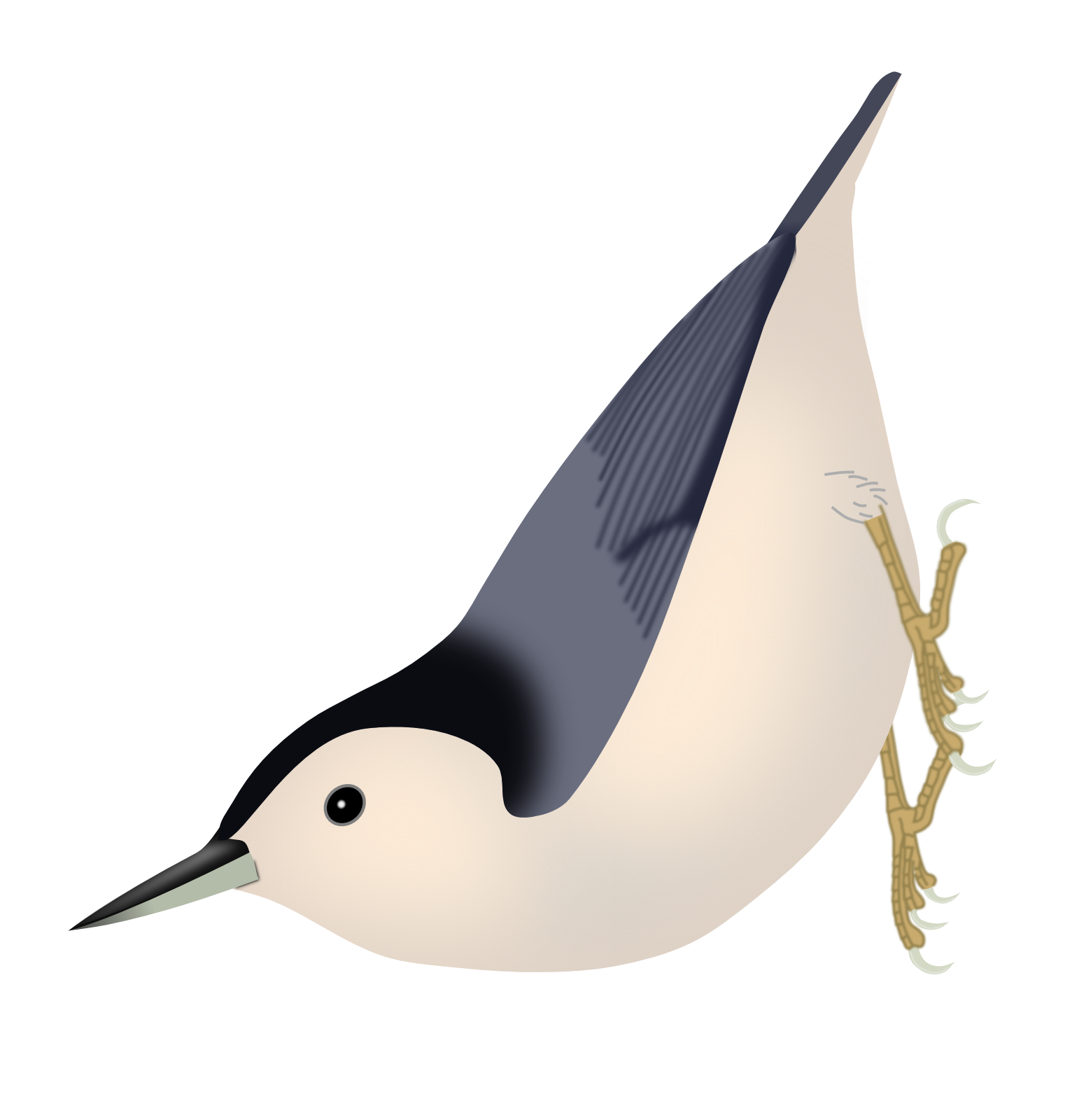
White-breasted nuthatch (S. carolinensis)

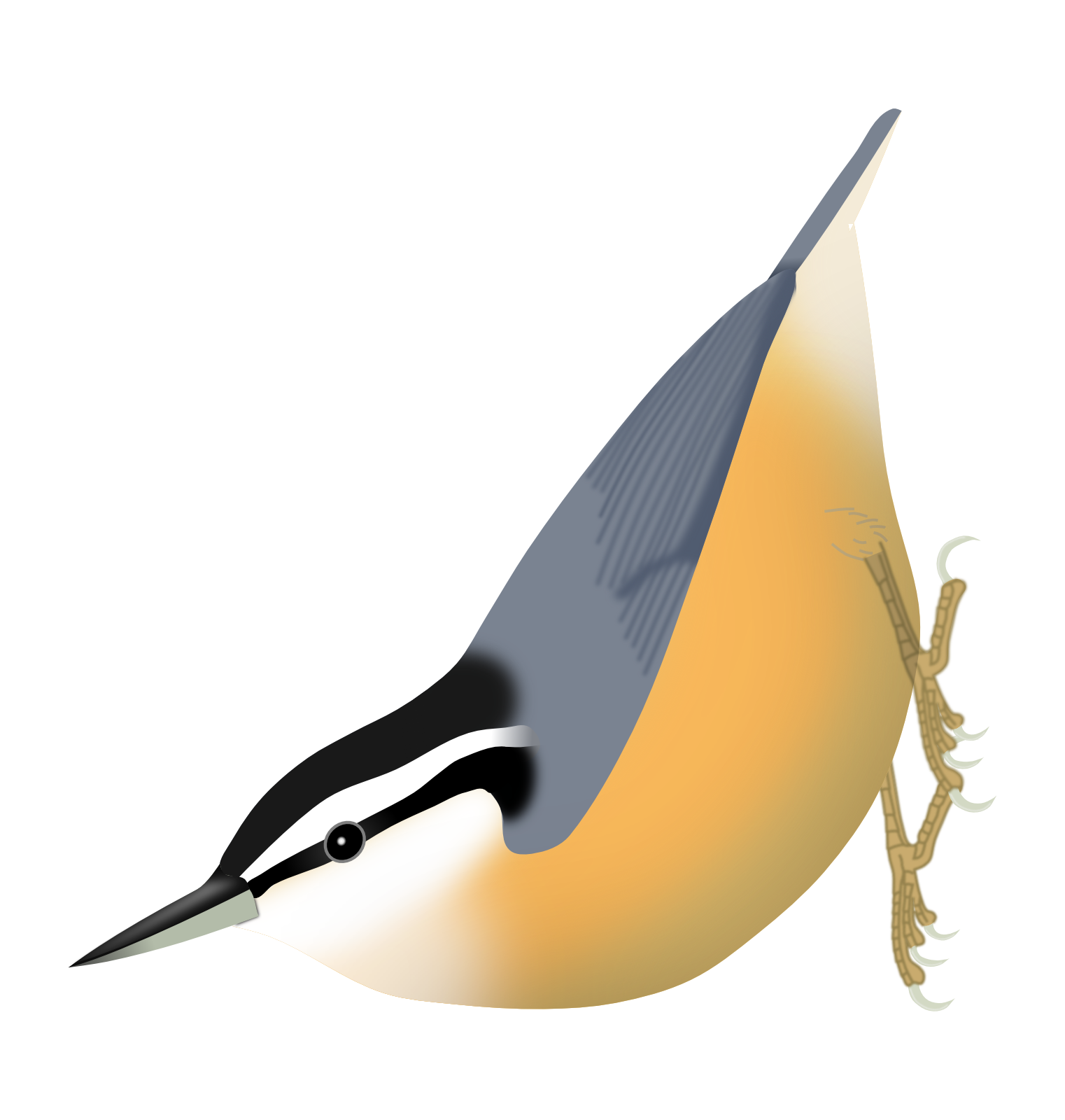
Red-breasted nuthatch (S. canadensis)

Pygmy nuthatch (S. pygmaea)

Brown-headed nuthatch (S. pusilla)

== Distribution and habitat ==
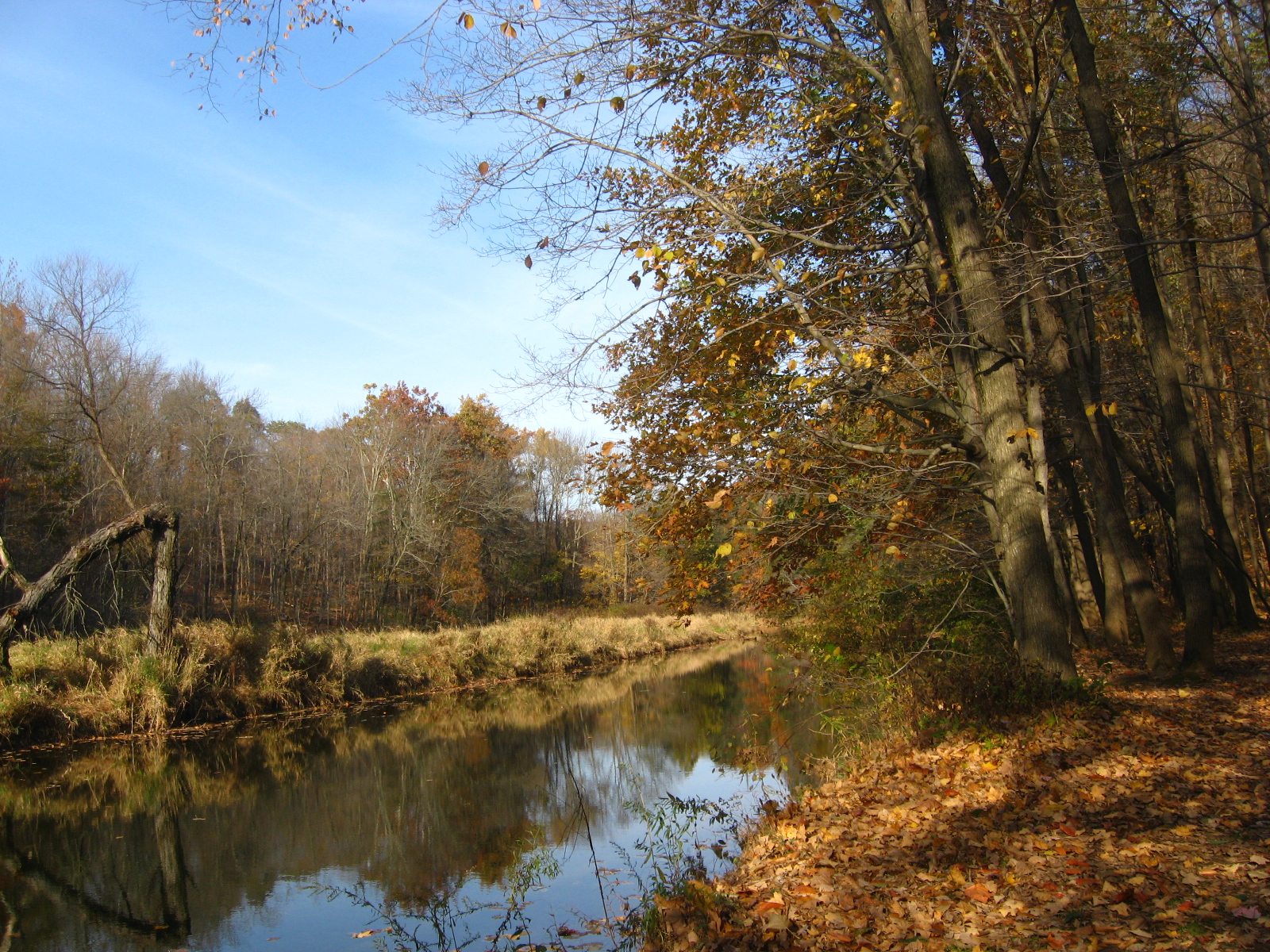
Deciduous woodland is the preferred habitat in the northeast.

The breeding habitat of the white-breasted nuthatch is woodland across North America, from southern Canada to northern Florida and southern Mexico. In the eastern part of its range, its preferred habitat is old-growth open deciduous or mixed forest, including orchards, parks, suburban gardens and cemeteries; it is found mainly in the lowlands, although it breeds at 1,675 m (5,495 ft) elevation in Tennessee. In the west and Mexico, the white-breasted nuthatch is found in open montane pine and oak woodlands, and nesting occurs at up to 3,200 m (10,500 ft) elevation in Nevada, California and Mexico. Pinyon and juniper and riverside woodlands may be used locally where available. The white-breasted nuthatch is the only North American nuthatch usually found in deciduous trees; red-breasted, pygmy and brown-headed nuthatches prefer pines or other conifers.

The presence of mature or decaying trees with holes suitable for nesting is essential, and trees such as oak, beech and hickory are favored in the east since they also provide edible seeds. White-breasted nuthatches seldom excavate their own nest holes like red-breasted nuthatches. Although suitable habitat is distributed continentally, it is discontinuous. The separate populations of this non-migratory species have diverged to form distinct regional subspecies.

The white-breasted nuthatch, like most of its genus, is non-migratory, and the adults normally stay in their territory year-round. There may be more noticeable dispersal due to seed failure or high reproductive success in some years, and this species has occurred as a vagrant to Vancouver Island, Santa Cruz Island, and Bermuda. One bird landed on the RMS Queen Mary six hours' sailing east of New York City in October 1963.

== Ecology and behavior ==
The white-breasted nuthatch often travels with small mixed flocks in winter. These flocks are led by titmice and chickadees, with nuthatches and downy woodpeckers as common attendant species. Participants in such flocks are thought to benefit in terms of foraging and predator avoidance. It is likely that the attendant species also access the information carried in the chickadees' calls and reduce their own level of vigilance accordingly.

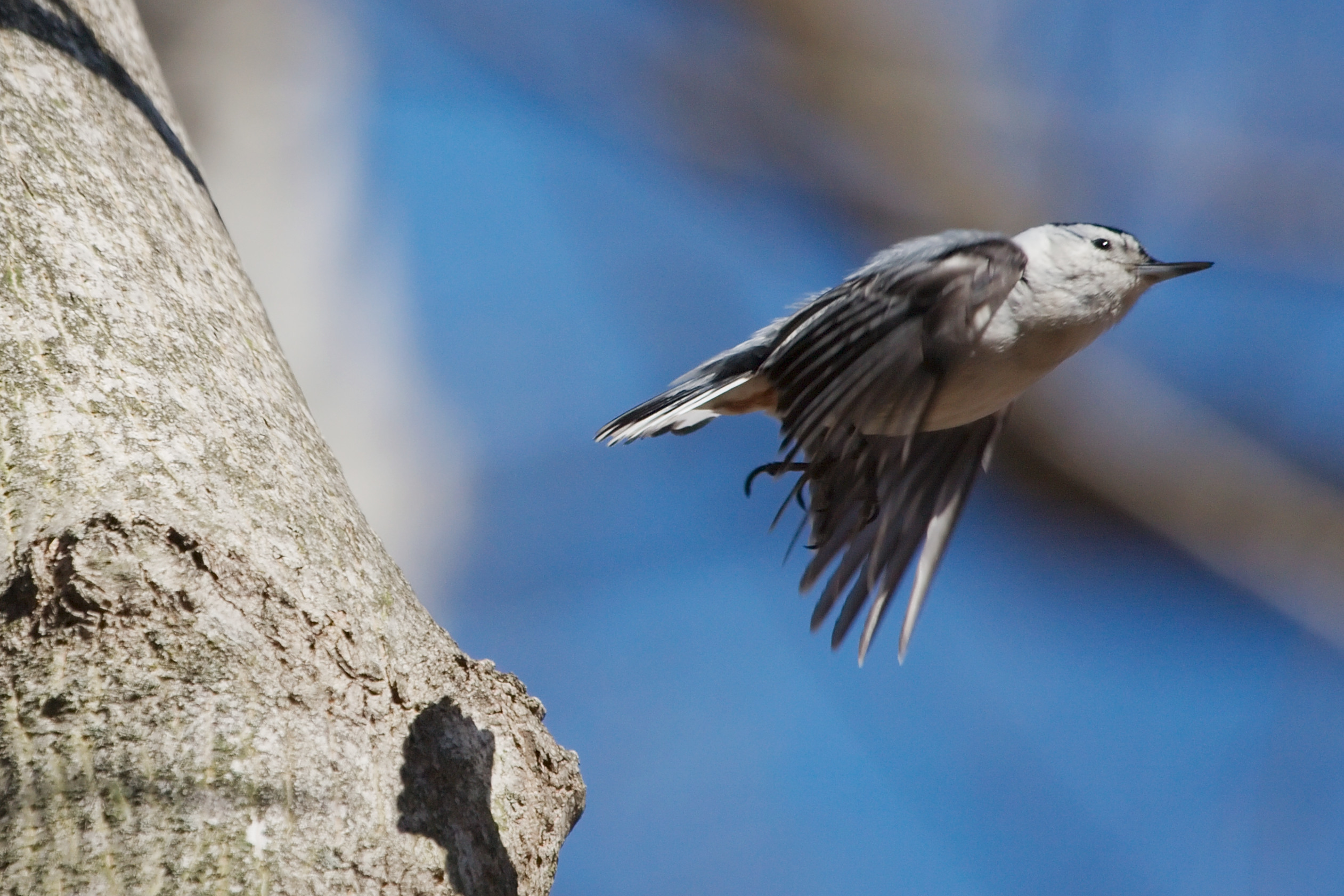
In flight

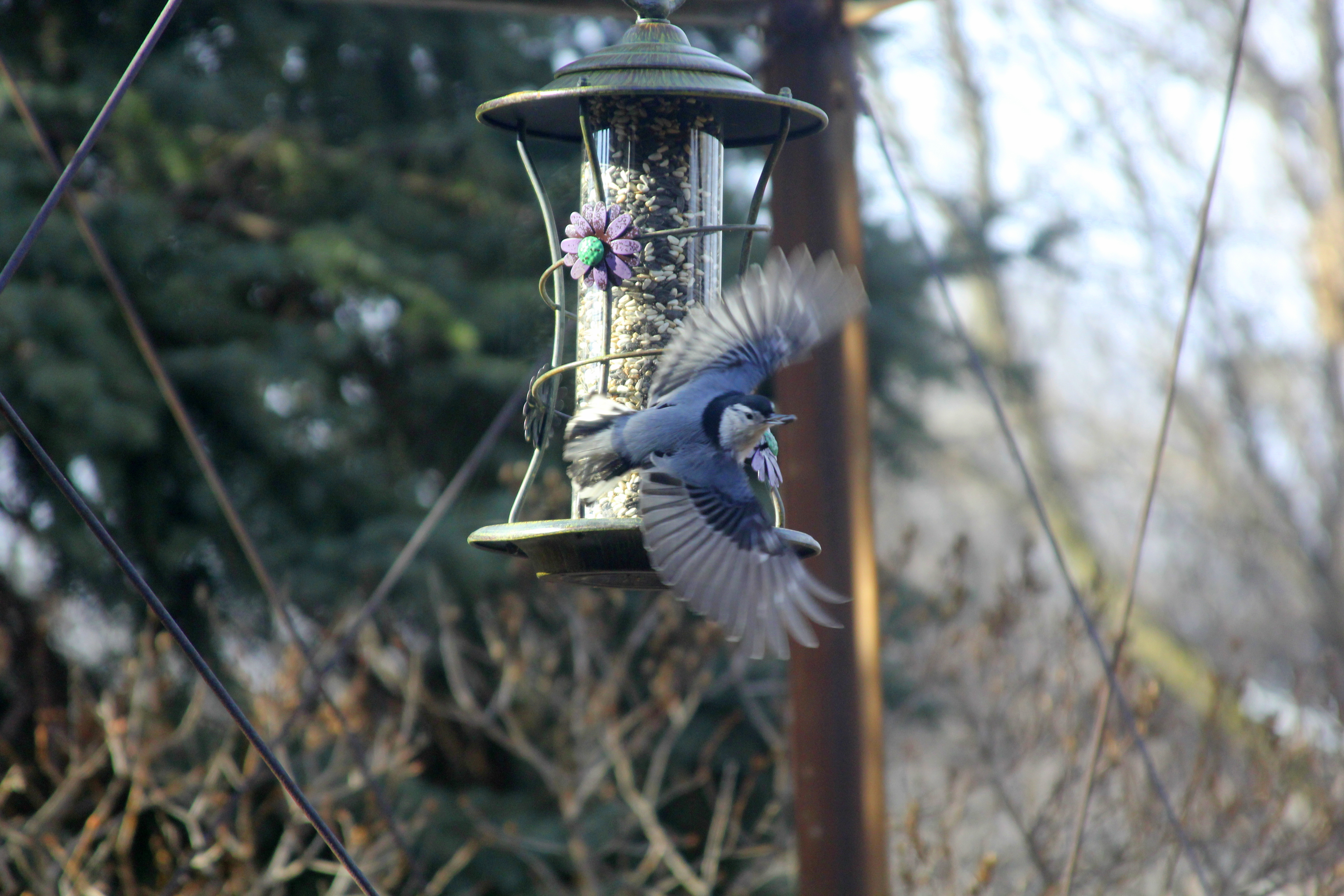
In flight, from above

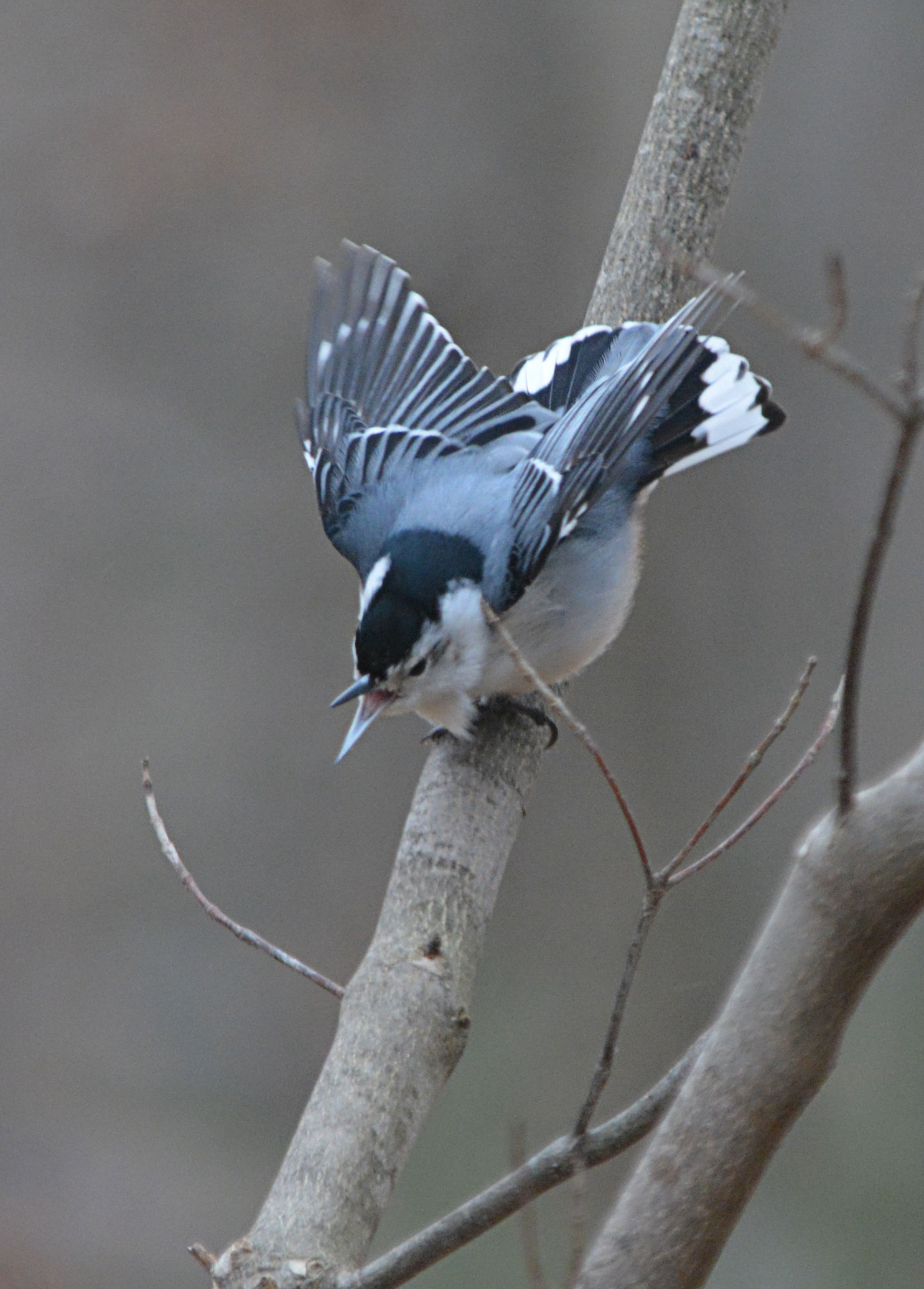
In a threatening position

=== Breeding ===
The white-breasted nuthatch is monogamous, and pairs form following a courtship in which the male bows to the female, spreading his tail and drooping his wings while swaying back and forth; he also feeds her morsels of food. The pair establish a territory of 0.1–0.15 km^{2} (25–37 acres) in woodland, and up to 0.2 km^{2} (49 acres) in semi-wooded habitats, and then remain together year-round until one partner dies or disappears. The nest cavity is usually a natural hole in a decaying tree, sometimes an old woodpecker nest.

The nest hole is usually 3–12 m (9.8–39.4 ft) high in a tree and is lined with fur, fine grass, and shredded bark. The clutch is 5 to 9 eggs which are creamy-white, speckled with reddish brown, and average 19 mm × 14 mm (0.75 in × 0.55 in) in size. The eggs are incubated by the female for 13 to 14 days prior to hatching, and the altricial chicks fledge in a further 18 to 26 days. Both adults feed the chicks in the nest and for about two weeks after fledging, and the male also feeds the female while she is incubating. Once independent, juveniles leave the adults' territory and either establish their own territory or become "floaters", unpaired birds without territories. It is probably these floaters which are mainly involved in the irregular dispersals of this species. This species of nuthatch roosts in tree holes or behind loose bark when not breeding and has the unusual habit of removing its feces from the roost site in the morning. It usually roosts alone except in very cold weather, when up to 29 birds have been recorded together.

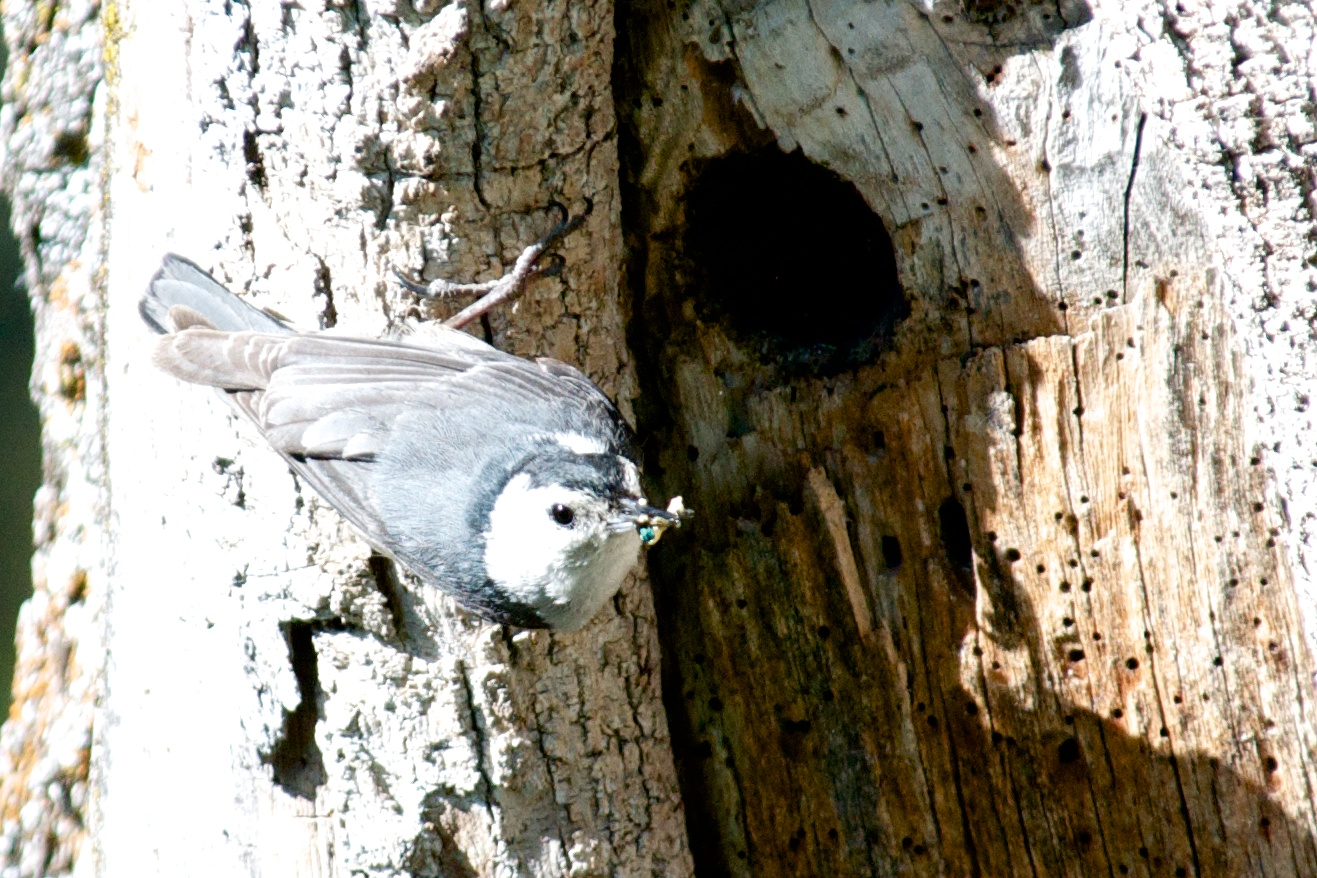
An adult at the entrance of the nest, an insect in the beak

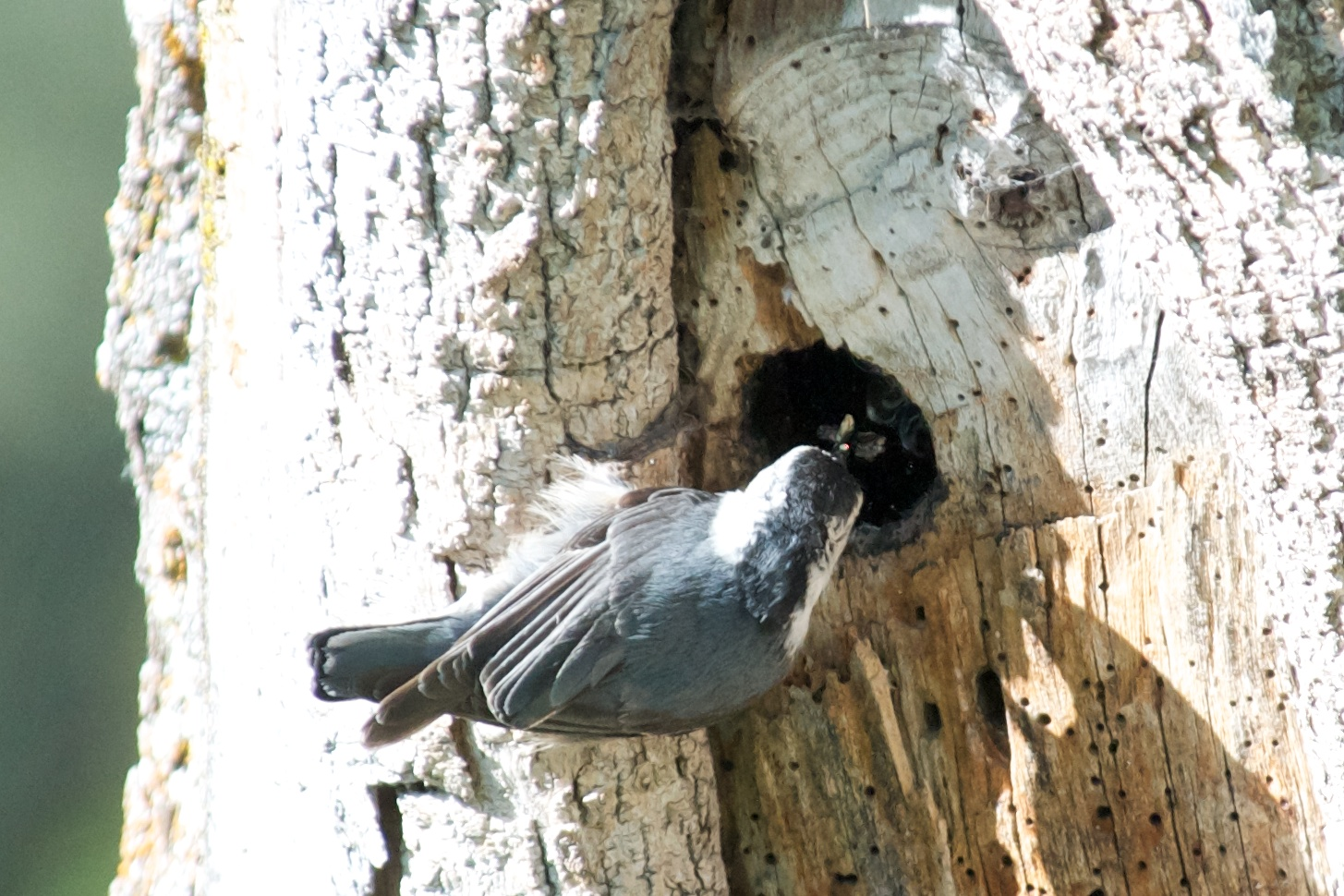
An adult at nest entrance, feeding its nestlings

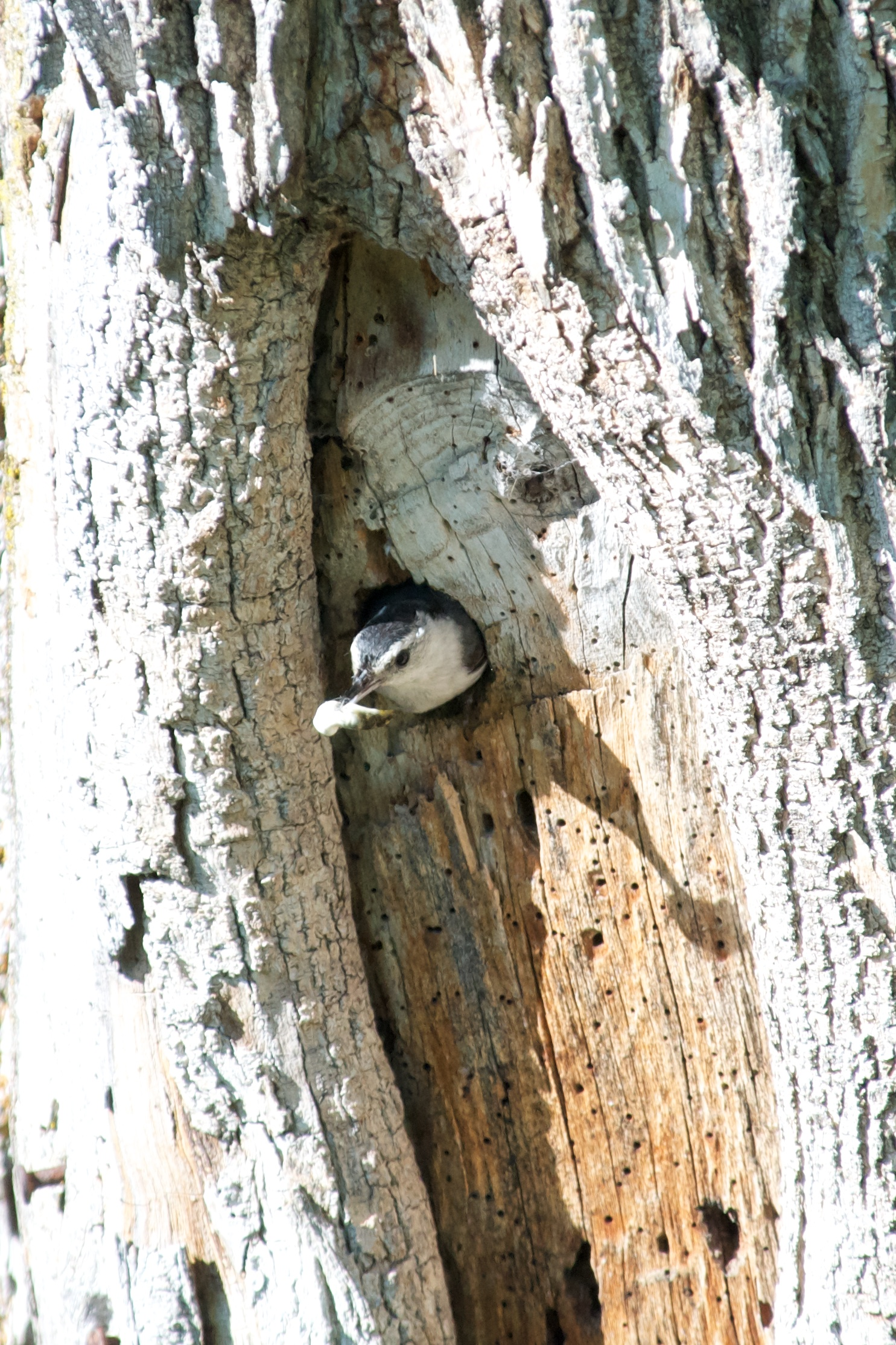
An adult removing a fecal sac from the nest

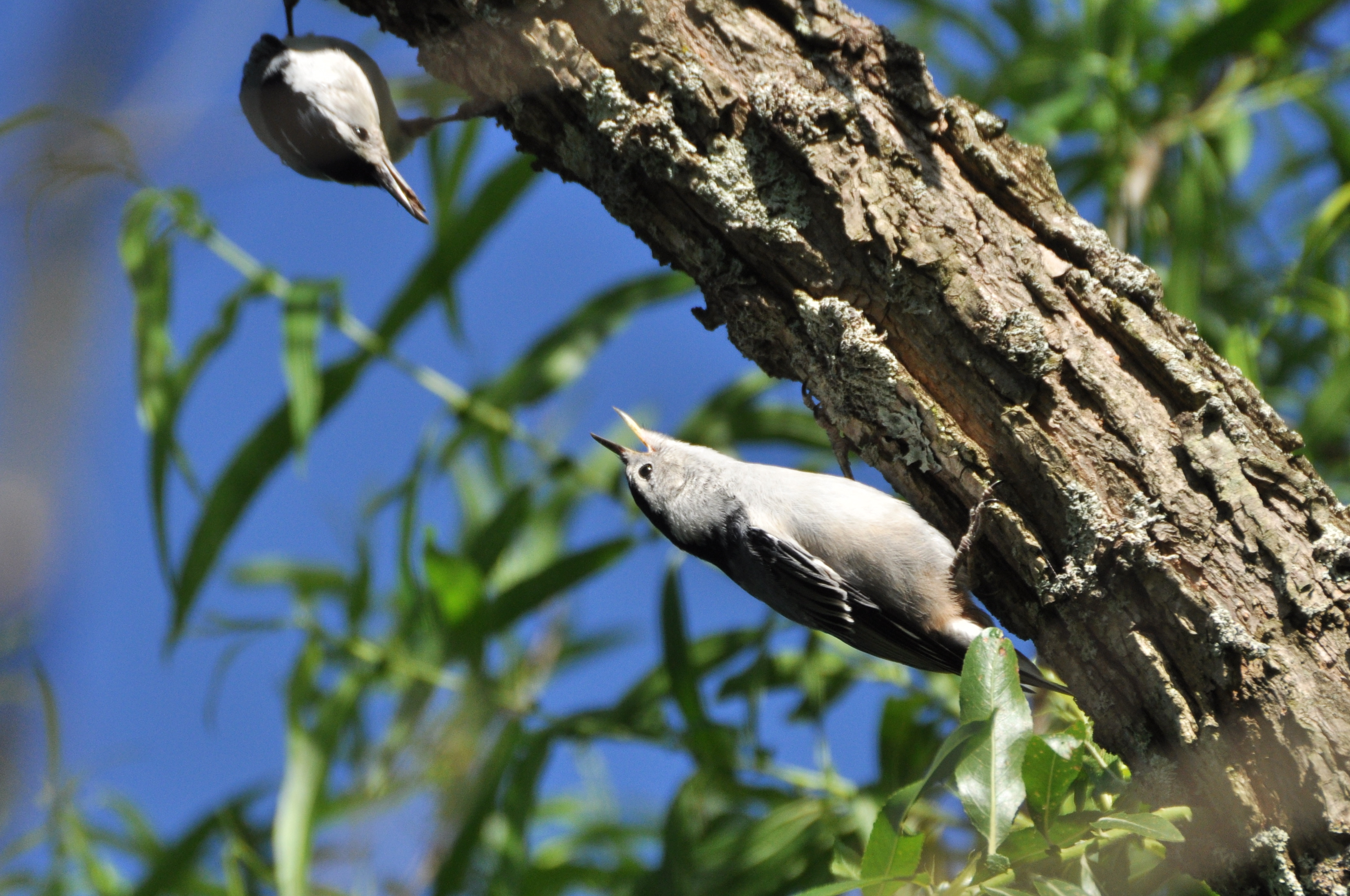
An adult preparing to feed its young

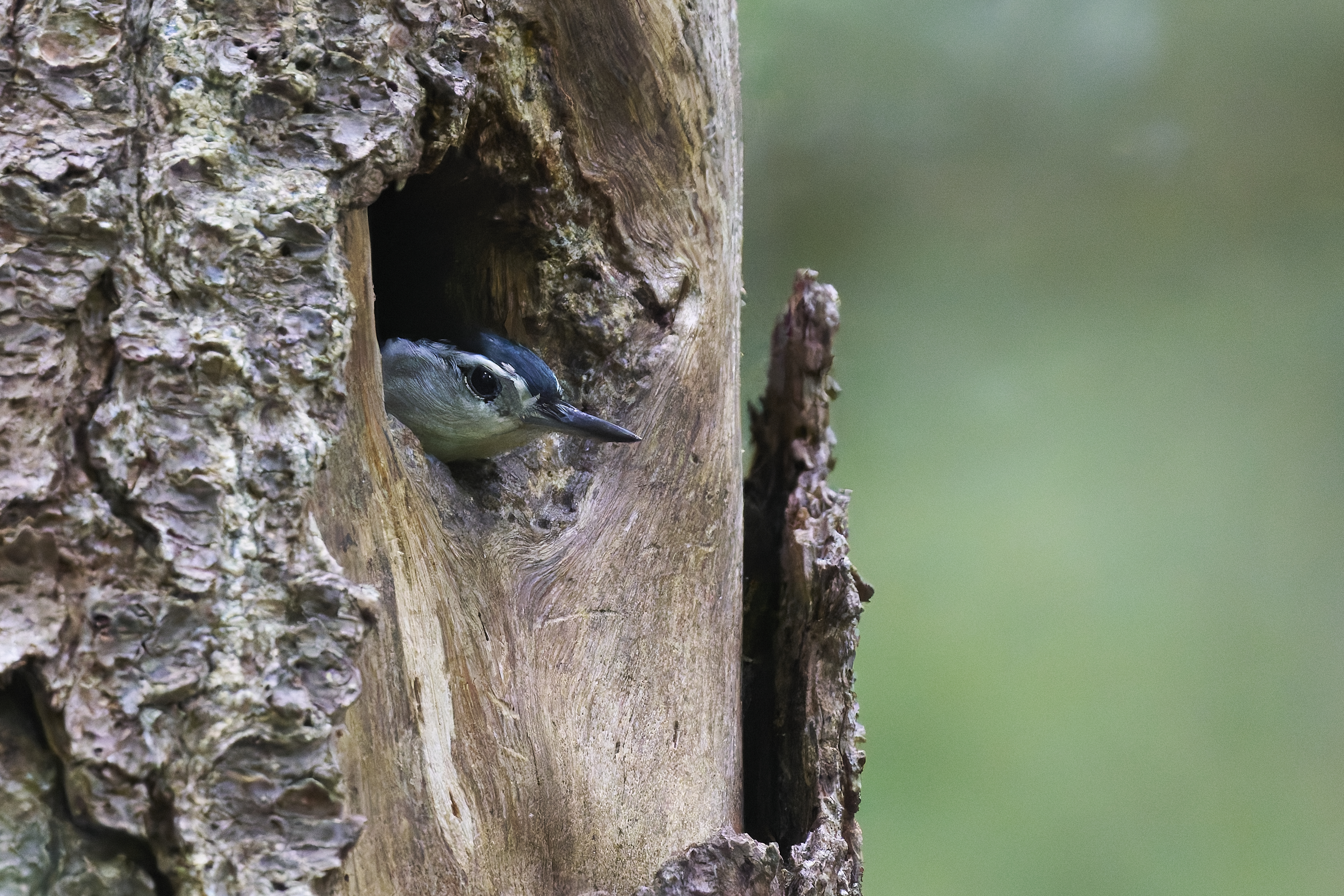
Adult emerging from nest hole

=== Voice ===
Rapid cries of an individual from Hennepin County, Minnesota

Like other nuthatches, the white-breasted nuthatch is a noisy bird with a range of vocalizations. The male's mating song is a rapid nasal qui-qui-qui-qui-qui-qui-qui. The contact call between members of a pair, given most frequently in the fall and winter is a thin squeaky nit, uttered up to 30 times a minute. A more distinctive sound is a shrill kri repeated rapidly with mounting anxiety or excitement kri-kri-kri-kri-kri-kri-kri-kri; the Rocky Mountains and Great Basin subspecies have a higher, faster yididitititit call, and Pacific birds a more nasal beeerf.

=== Feeding ===
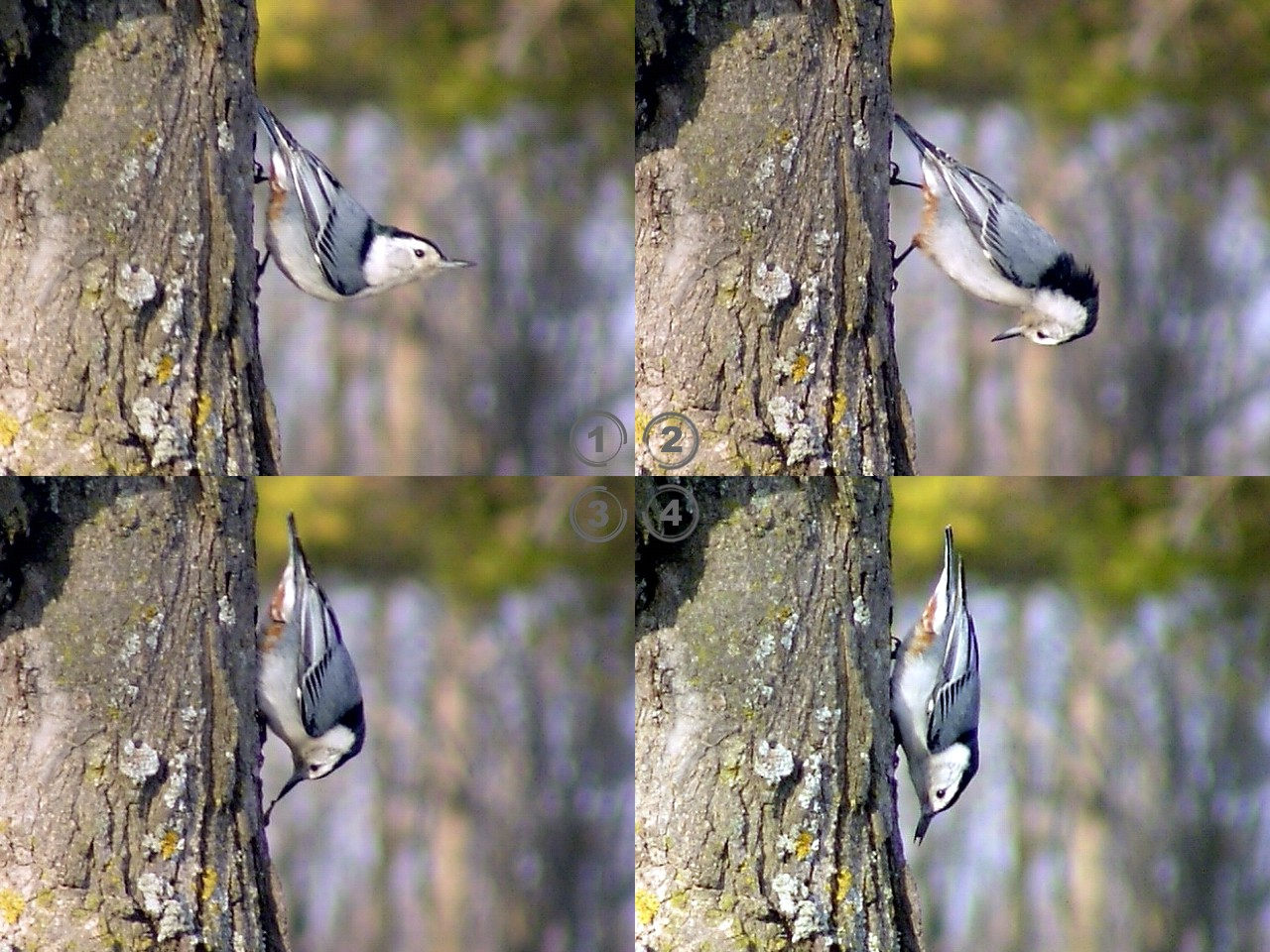
Feeding sequence

Feeding on suet

The white-breasted nuthatch forages along tree trunks and branches in a similar way to woodpeckers and treecreepers, but does not use its tail for additional support, instead progressing in jerky hops using its strong legs and feet. All nuthatches are distinctive when seeking food because they are able to descend tree trunks head-first and can hang upside-down beneath twigs and branches.

The white-breasted nuthatch is omnivorous, eating insects and seeds. It places large food items such as acorns or hickory nuts in crevices in tree trunks, and then hammers them open with its strong beak; surplus seeds are cached under loose bark or crevices of trees. The diet in winter may be nearly 70% seeds, but in summer it is mainly insects. The insects consumed by the white-breasted nuthatch include caterpillars, ants, and pest species such as pine weevils, oystershell and other scale insects, and jumping plant lice. This bird will occasionally feed on the ground, and readily visits feeding stations for nuts, suet and sunflower seeds, the last of which it often takes away to store. The white-breasted nuthatch was also observed visiting raccoon latrines in order to find seeds.

=== Predators and parasites ===
Predators of adult nuthatches include owls and diurnal birds of prey (such as sharp-shinned and Cooper's hawks), and nestlings and eggs are eaten by woodpeckers, small squirrels, and climbing snakes such as the western rat snake. The white-breasted nuthatch responds to predators near the nest by flicking its wings while making hn-hn calls. When a bird leaves the nest hole, it wipes around the entrance with a piece of fur or vegetation; this makes it more difficult for a predator to find the nest using its sense of smell. The nuthatch may also smear blister beetles around the entrance to its nest, and it has been suggested that the unpleasant smell from the crushed insects deters squirrels, its chief competitor for natural tree cavities. The estimated average lifespan of the white-breasted nuthatch is two years, but the record is twelve years and nine months.

The white-breasted nuthatch's responses to predators may be linked to a reproductive strategy. A study compared the white-breasted nuthatch with the red-breasted nuthatch in terms of the willingness of males to feed incubating females on the nest when presented with models of predators. The models were of a sharp-shinned hawk, which hunts adult nuthatches, and a house wren, which destroys eggs. The white-breasted nuthatch is shorter-lived than the red-breasted nuthatch, but has more young, and was found to respond more strongly to the egg predator, whereas the red-breasted showed greater concern with the hawk. This supports the theory that longer-lived species benefit from adult survival and future breeding opportunities, while birds with shorter life spans place more value on the survival of their larger broods.

The white-breasted nuthatch can be a host for certain parasites such as the protists Leucocytozoon or Trypanosoma. The white-breasted nuthatch is the typical host of another protist species, Haemoproteus sittae. Trematodes, such as Collyriclum faba, have also been recorded in this species. The white-breasted nuthatch can also be the target of hematophagous flies of the family Hippoboscidae, such as Ornithoica confluenta and Ornithomya anchineuria or of certain mites, such as Knemidokoptes jamaicensis, which produces scabies.

== Conservation status ==
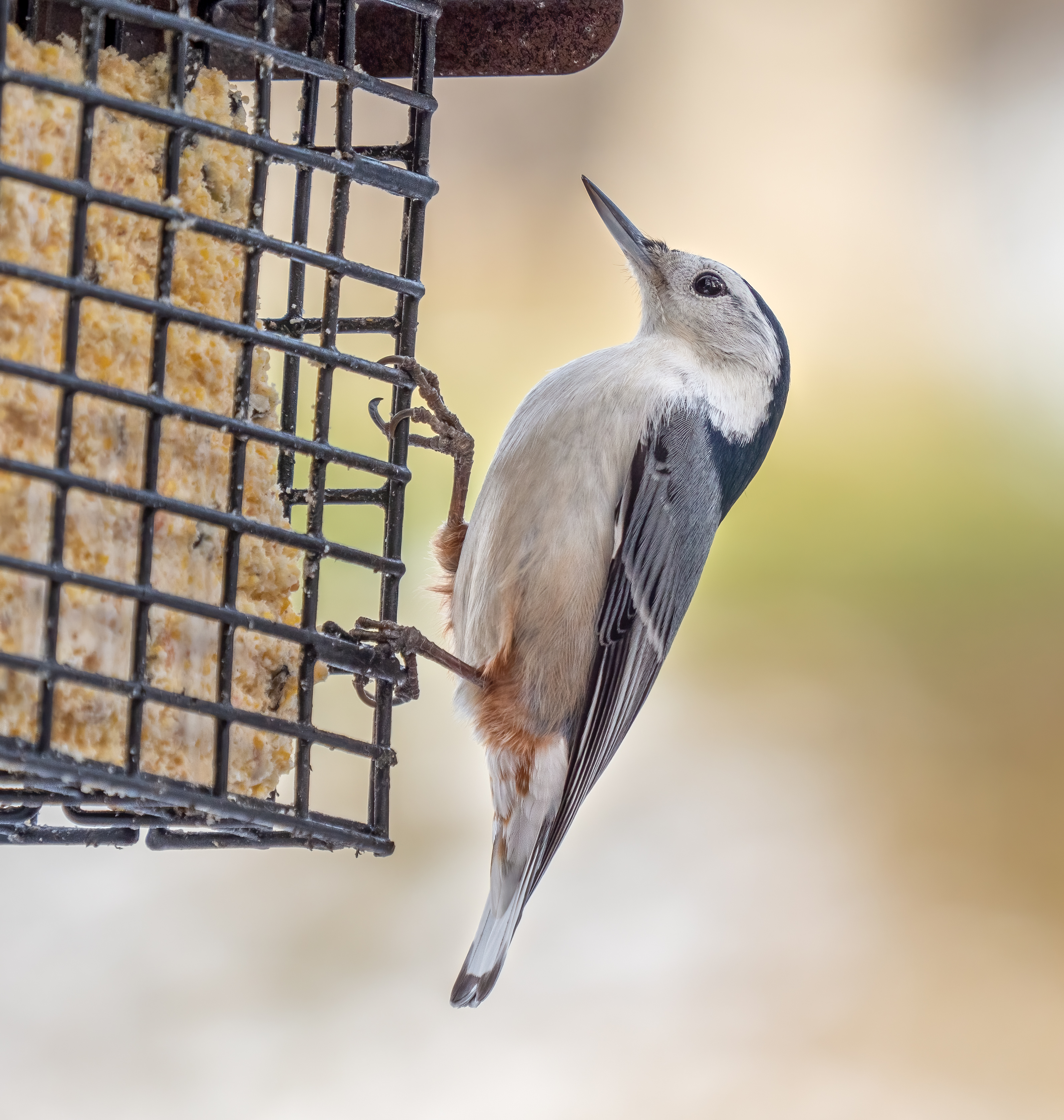
Bird feeders provide a supplementary source of food.

The white-breasted nuthatch is a common species with a large range, estimated at 8,600,000 km^{2} (3,300,000 sq mi). Its total population is estimated at 10 million individuals, and there is evidence of an overall population increase, so it is not believed to approach either the size criterion (fewer than 10,000 mature individuals) or the population decline criterion (declining more than 30% in ten years or three generations) of the IUCN Red List. For these reasons, the species is evaluated as least concern by the International Union for the Conservation of Nature.

The removal of dead trees from forests may cause problems locally for this species because it requires cavity sites for nesting; declines have been noted in Washington state, Florida, and more widely in the southeastern U.S. west to Texas. In contrast, the breeding range is expanding in Alberta, and numbers are increasing in the northeast due to regrown forest. The white-breasted nuthatch is protected under the Migratory Bird Treaty Act of 1918, to which the three countries in which it occurs (Canada, Mexico, and the United States) are all signatories.
