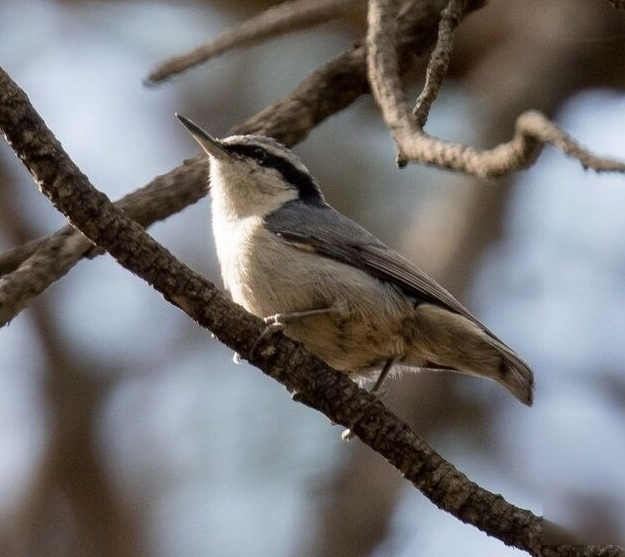
- At Black Dragon Pool, Yunnan, China

Conservation status
- Least Concern (IUCN 3.1)

Scientific classification
- Kingdom: Animalia
- Phylum: Chordata
- Class: Aves
- Order: Passeriformes
- Family: Sittidae
- Genus: Sitta
- Species: S. yunnanensis

Binomial name
- Sitta yunnanensis Ogilvie-Grant, 1900
- Range of the Yunnan nuthatch

= Yunnan nuthatch =

Species of nuthatch endemic to China

The Yunnan nuthatch (Sitta yunnanensis) is a bird species in the nuthatch family Sittidae. It was first described by William Robert Ogilvie-Grant in 1900 based on a male holotype. It is a small nuthatch, measuring 12 centimetres (4.7 in) in length on average and weighs between 7.5 and 13 grams (0.26 and 0.46 oz). The grey-blue upperparts contrast with the light, smooth, buffy lowerparts. It has a fine white eyebrow above a black eyestripe, which is distinct when the plumage is fresh, and exhibits a small degree of sexual dimorphism. A noisy bird, it produces simple, nasal sounds, sometimes in repetitive series.

Its ecology is not well known, but it feeds on insects that it finds on pine branches. It can be found in the prefectures of Yunnan, Sichuan, and Guizhou in Southwest China, where it prefers sparsely forested pine forests and avoids dense spruce and fir forests. It is generally rare but can be locally common. It has a small range of 170,000 square kilometres (66,000 sq mi). A 2009 study predicted that its population could decrease by 43.6–47.7% between 2040 and 2069.

== Taxonomy ==
The Yunnan nuthatch was first described as Sitta yunnanensis by Scottish ornithologist William Robert Ogilvie-Grant in 1900 based on a male holotype brought from southern Yunnan by Captain Alfred Wingate. It was placed in the subgenus Micrositta by Buturlin in 1916. There are no subspecies.

The canadensis group, which is also sometimes called the subgenus Micrositta, contains six species; the Yunnan nuthatch, the red-breasted nuthatch (S. canadensis), the Chinese nuthatch (S. villosa), the Corsican nuthatch (S. whiteheadi), Krüper's nuthatch (S. krueperi) and the Algerian nuthatch (S. ledanti). In 1953, the Dutch ornithologists Karel Voous and John G. van Marle thought that the Yunnan nuthatch formed a link between the canadensis and europaea groups, and simultaneously that it was very closely related to the canadensis group, of which it was a basal representative in terms of distribution and plumage. In 1957, Charles Vaurie postulated that the white-tailed nuthatch was the Yunnan nuthatch's closest relative. In 1998, Eric Pasquet studied the mitochondrial DNA about ten species of nuthatch, including the different species in the canadensis group, but the Yunnan nuthatch was not included in the study. In 2014, Éric Pasquet and colleagues published a nuclear and mitochondrial DNA-based phylogeny of 21 species of nuthatch and confirmed the 1998 study relationships within the canadensis group, adding the Yunnan nuthatch, which is found to be the most basal species of the group.

Phylogenetic tree detail
Nuthatch phylogenic detail according to Pasquet, et al. (2014):

- - Yunnan nuthatch (S. yunnanensis)
  - - - Red-breasted nuthatch (S. canadensis)
      - - Corsican nuthatch (S. whiteheadi)
        - Chinese nuthatch (S. villosa)
    - - Krüper's nuthatch (S. krueperi)
      - Algerian nuthatch (S. ledanti)

== Description ==
Schematic representation of the Yunnan nuthatch in fresh plumage.

The upperparts of the Yunnan nuthatch are blue-grey, including the calotte, despite being separated from the upper mantle by a paler area. It has a thin white eyebrow, which extends to the forehead and surmounts a black eyestripe, which widens noticeably on the back, on the sides of the mantle. The eye has a fine white circle around it, and it has a white cheek and throat. The underparts are plain and pale, pinkish buff. The beak is thin and pointed and the almost straight culmen can give the impression that the tip of the beak is coming up. Its irises are dark brown, the bill grey-black with the base of the lower mandible horny or yellowish, and the legs and feet are grey-brown. The Yunnan nuthatch is a small nuthatch, measuring around 12 cm (4.7 in) in length on average, and its wing chord is 69.5 to 74 millimetres (2.74 to 2.91 in) on male specimens and 67 to 74 millimetres (2.6 to 2.9 in) on female specimens. On males, the tale measures 35 to 41 millimetres (1.4 to 1.6 in) and on females, it measures between 36 and 38 millimetres (1.4 and 1.5 in).

The species exhibits little sexual dimorphism, but the black of the female's eyestripe is on average less intense and its underparts are duller and greyer. The plumage is fresh from August, and gradually wears down until the following spring. In worn plumage, the whitish tips of the eyebrow feathers are worn away, and the eyebrow line becomes discontinuous or inconspicuous. The upperparts are duller, less blue. The tail and wing feathers also wear out, but the blue-grey tips of the rectrices persist at least until May. The underparts become duller and dirtier, turning greyish-white. The young is duller than the adult, with the eyebrow less marked and not extending to the forehead, sometimes almost absent and consisting of a lighter cap margin. The eye line is also less wide, the cheek is dirty grey and not white. The throat is whiter, but the rest of the underparts are duller, greyish cinnamon, though not as pale as in a worn plumaged adult. The upperparts are duller and greyer. The bill of fledged young is shorter and has a pale base. Adults undergo a complete moult from July to September, and perhaps sometimes a partial moult before the breeding season in January and February, which includes the breast.

The giant nuthatch can occur in the same type of habitat as the Yunnan nuthatch, but is much larger in size and lacks a white eyebrow. The chestnut-vented nuthatch is closer in size to the Yunnan nuthatch, but has reddish flanks and no white eyebrows.

== Ecology and behaviour ==
=== Vocalizations ===
The Yunnan nuthatch is a fairly noisy bird, and typically makes many individual sounds: nit, kni, tit, pit, or a low and nasal toik. Its call, nit, is repeated in sets lasting four to ten seconds of five to six repetitions per second, producing a kni-kni-kni, kit-kit-kit, pi-pi-pi, or a nasal niew-niew-niew sound. It also produces a harsh schri-schri-schri or szi-szi-szi call, a trait shared by other small nuthatches. It sometimes produces a ziew-ziew-ziew call in calm sets of three notes per second, and can also emit nasal calls quit-quit-quit, schu-schu-schu, or tui-tui-tui.

=== Food and breeding ===
The diet of the Yunnan nuthatch is not well-known, but it is known to consume insects it catches on pine branches. There is a lack of information about its reproduction, but a female that was collected on 9 March was close to laying, while recently born Yunnan nuthatches were collected on 21 May.

== Distribution and habitat ==
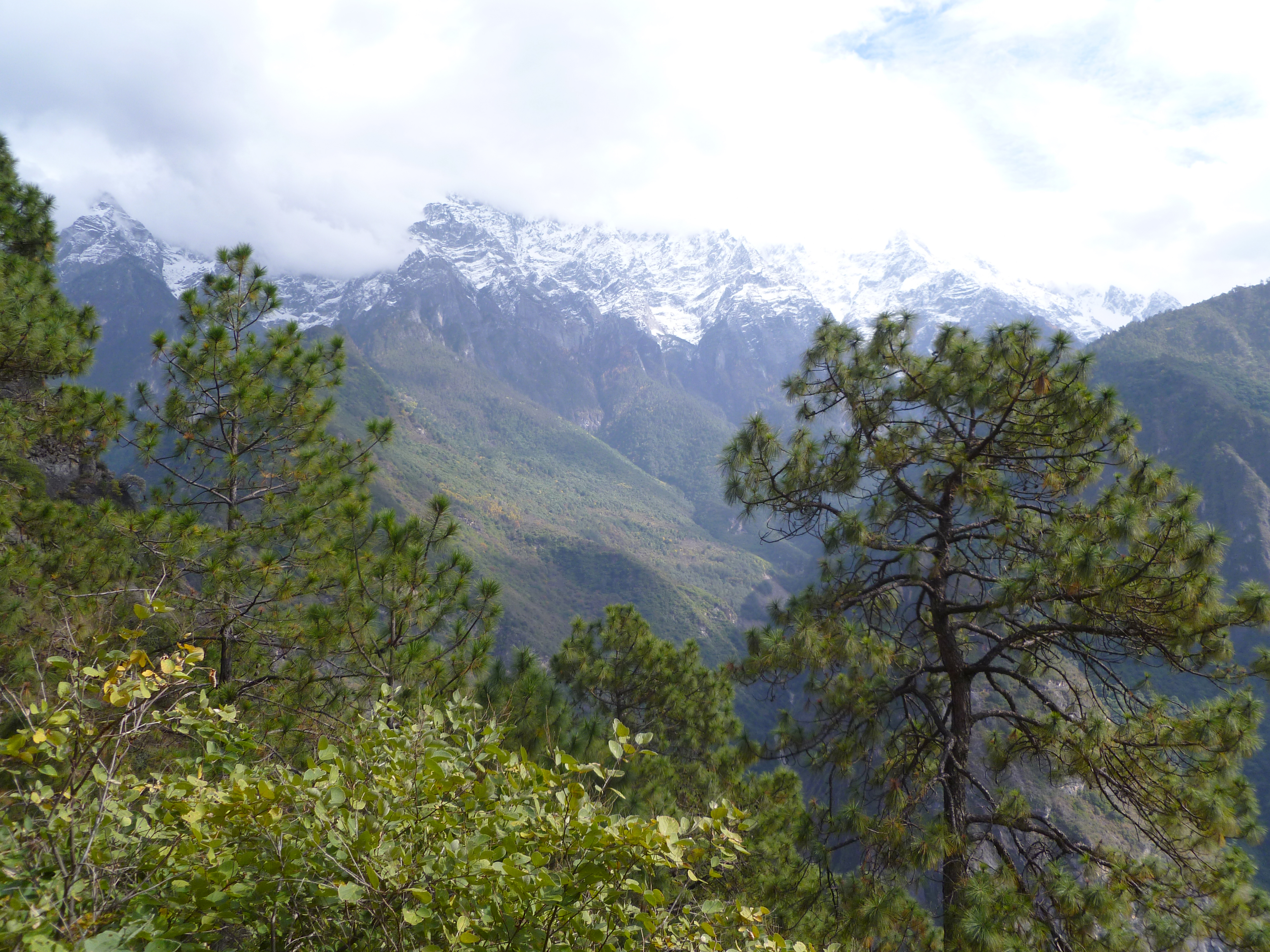
View of the snow-covered Jade Dragon Snow Mountain, with Pinus yunnanensis pines in the foreground.

The Yunnan nuthatch is endemic to Southwest China, and mainly occurs in the prefectures of Yunnan, Sichuan, and Guizhou. A study published in 2003 identified the species being endemic to China, and identified the Hengduan Mountains as the main area of endemism, but the bird also occurs in the Anjaw district of Arunachal Pradesh in India.

The Yunnan nuthatch is a sedentary species. It inhabits pine forests with sparse undergrowth, and avoids dense spruce and fir forests. Occasionally, it occurs on small pine trees 2 to 3 m (6.6 to 9.8 ft) high, in open forests or among scattered groups of trees. In the summer, it lives at altitudes between 2,440 and 3,960 m (8,010 and 12,990 ft) above sea level (ASL), and travels down into valleys during winter to heights up to 1,200 m (3,900 ft). However, it has been observed at between 2,600 and 4,000 m (8,500 and 13,100 ft) between November and January in Shuangbai County.

== Threats and protection ==
In 1987, Chinese ornithologist Zheng Zuoxin described the Yunnan nuthatch as rare, but it is locally common in areas such as Lijiang's pine forests. It has a small range of around 170,000 square kilometres (66,000 sq mi), and the bird disappeared from several locations in the early twentieth century. It is threatened by habitat destruction and is dependent on old pine forests, but also appears to live in degraded habitats. A 2009 study attempted to predict the impact of climate change on nuthatches in Asia, and shows the Yunnan nuthatch's distribution decreasing by between 43.6% and 47.7% by 2040–2069. The species used to be listed as near-threatened species by the International Union for Conservation of Nature, but is classified as least concern as of 2023.
