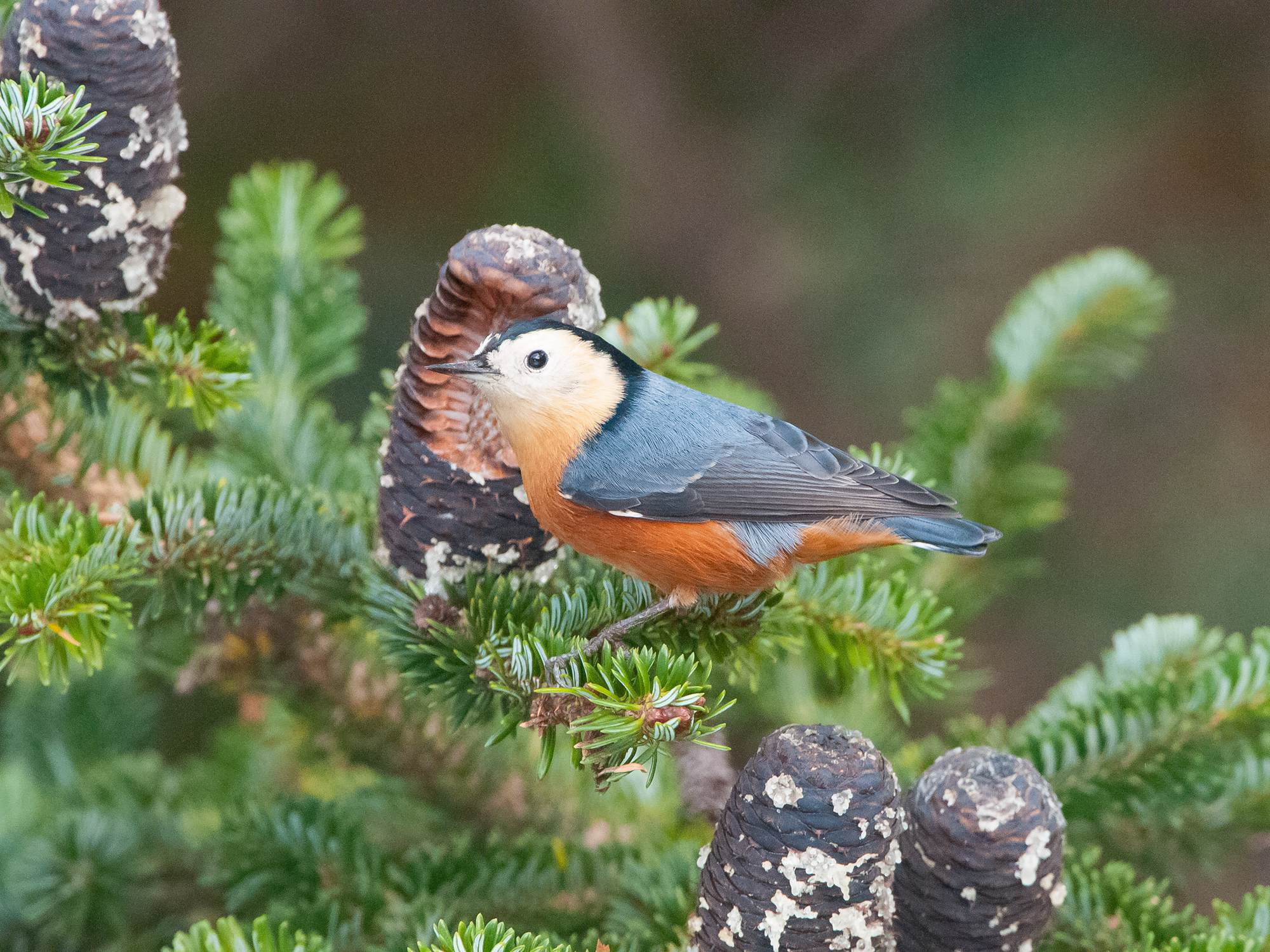
- In Abies fargesii in Gansu, China

Conservation status
- Least Concern (IUCN 3.1)

Scientific classification
- Kingdom: Animalia
- Phylum: Chordata
- Class: Aves
- Order: Passeriformes
- Family: Sittidae
- Genus: Sitta
- Species: S. przewalskii

Binomial name
- Sitta przewalskii Berezowski & Bianchi, 1891
- Distribution of Przevalski's nuthatch Distribution of white-cheeked nuthatch

= Przevalski's nuthatch =

Small passerine bird endemic to southeastern Tibet and west central China

Przevalski's nuthatch (Sitta przewalskii) is a bird species in the family Sittidae, collectively known as nuthatches. Long regarded as a subspecies of the white-cheeked nuthatch (Sitta leucopsis), it nevertheless differs significantly in morphology and vocal behaviour. Both S. przewalskii and S. leucopsis have been regarded in the past as closely related to the North American white-breasted nuthatch (S. carolinensis), but this is not supported by modern genetic research. It is a medium-sized nuthatch, measuring about 13 cm (5 in) in length. Its upper body is a dark grey-blue or slate colour, becoming dark blue-black at the crown. The cheeks and throat are a pale buff-orange, turning to a rich cinnamon on the underparts that intensifies on the sides of the breast. The calls consist of alternating series of ascending whistles and short notes.

The bird is endemic to areas in southeastern Tibet and west central China, including eastern Qinghai, Gansu and Sichuan, inhabiting coniferous montane forest of spruce (Picea) and fir (Abies). The altitude at which it nests varies according to locality, but typically is from 2,250–4,500 m (7,380–14,760 ft). The species was first described in 1891 from a specimen collected in China's Haidong Prefecture. The common name and Latin binomial commemorate the Russian explorer Nikolay Przhevalsky, who first recorded the species in 1884. Little is known about its ecology, which is probably comparable to that of other nuthatches.

It was given the rank of full species (separate from the white-cheeked nuthatch) in 2005 in Pamela C. Rasmussen's Birds of South Asia. The Ripley Guide. Other authorities followed suit; phylogenetic studies in 2014 and 2020 found it to be one of a basal pair, with S. leucopsis, of the nuthatch evolutionary tree out of all species examined, dispelling a hypothesis that S. przewalskii could be related S. carolinensis.

== Taxonomy ==
The nuthatches constitute a genus Sitta of small passerine birds in the family Sittidae. Nuthatches are typified by short, compressed wings and short, square 12-feathered tails, compact bodies, longish pointed bills, strong toes with long claws, and behaviourally, by their unique head-first manner of descending tree trunks. Most nuthatches have blue-grey upperparts and a black eyestripe. One notable feature of Przevalski's nuthatch is that it lacks the eyestripe common to most nuthatch species.

Sitta is derived from the Ancient Greek name for nuthatches, σίττη, sittē. "Nuthatch", first recorded in 1350, is derived from "nut" and a word probably related to "hack", since these birds hack at nuts they have wedged into crevices.

Sitta przewalskii was first described scientifically in 1891 by the Russian ornithologists Mikhail Mikhailovich Berezovsky and Valentin Bianchi based on a specimen obtained in the Haidong Prefecture in Eastern Qinghai. The common name and Latin binomial commemorate the Russian explorer Nikolay Przhevalsky, who found the species in Tibet in 1884 and dubbed it "Sitta eckloni" without providing adequate description, rendering it a nomen nudum. Though the native ranges of Sitta przewalskii and S. leucopsis (white-cheeked nuthatch) are separated from each other by almost 1,500 km (930 mi), Przevalski's nuthatch was described as closely related to the white-cheeked nuthatch, and was thereafter often considered and treated as conspecific, as a subspecies of S. leucopsis.

In 1996, the Oriental Bird Club split the species from S. leucopsis in its checklist An Annotated Checklist of the Birds of the Oriental Region; this was followed in 2005 by the Birds of South Asia. The Ripley Guide, the journal BirdingAsia in 2007, and by the International Ornithological Congress, and the Handbook of the Birds of the World. No subspecies of S. przewalskii itself have been identified.

In 2014, Eric Pasquet et al. published a phylogeny based on examination of nuclear and mitochondrial DNA of 21 nuthatch species. Though S. leucopsis was not included in the study, it found that within the nuthatch group covered, S. przewalskii is basal in the nuthatch evolutionary family tree, and thus "sister to all other nuthatches, without any close relatives".

A fuller study in 2020 by Martin Päckert et al. incorporated both S. przewalskii and S. leucopsis; this confirmed that the two species are closely related, and are a basal pair in the genus. Their time-calibrated study demonstrated a roughly 2–3 million year divergence between them, similar to that between many other universally accepted species in the genus, and a roughly 8–13 million year separation between this species pair and the rest of the genus.

== Description ==
Przevalski's nuthatch is a medium-sized nuthatch, measuring about 12.5 cm (4.9 in) in length. The folded wing of the male is 72–77 mm (2.8–3.0 in) long and that of the female 69–74 mm (2.7–2.9 in); an average of 4 mm (0.16 in) shorter than the white-cheeked nuthatch. The wingspan is about 22.5 cm (8.9 in). The beak measures 17–17.6 mm (0.67–0.69 in), which is thinner and shorter than that of S. leucopsis, in which the beak is approximately 21 mm (0.83 in) long. The tarsus is 18 mm (0.71 in), and the tail is 43 mm (1.7 in) in length.

Because Sitta przewalskii has often been regarded as a subspecies of the white-cheeked nuthatch, its description has usually been made in comparison with it. Though both species lack the black eyestripe typical of other nuthatches, their colour is distinct, with S. leucopsis being white- or creamy-buff on its throat, cheeks, breast, flanks and belly, where S. przewalskii has varying shades and concentrations of cinnamon. S. przewalskii is marginally the smaller of the two, and its bill is markedly thinner. Males and females of the species are nearly identical in appearance, except for the male's brighter cinnamon colour.

The area above the eyes, including the forehead, crown and nape, is a deep blue-black, through the top edge of the mantle. The mantle proper is a medium to dark grey-blue as are the tertials and upperwing-coverts, turning to a dark grey at the median, greater and primary coverts and the alula. The secondaries and inner primaries are fringed in grey-blue. The central rectrices are grey-blue, and the outer rectrices are a blackish-grey, paling towards the tips.

The face and surrounding areas, including the lores, supercilium, ear-coverts, cheeks and throat are a white buff-orange. Below, the belly and breast are a rich cinnamon, darkening to an orange-cinnamon at the sides of the breast. The rear flanks and undertail-covert feathers are rufous. In worn plumage, the colour may be uneven in the lower parts and lighter in hue. The upper mandible of the bill is black, and the lower is grey with a black tip. The iris and legs are dark brown. Juveniles resemble adults, except for the base of the beak being yellow, proportionately shorter, and the overall colour being less vibrant.

== Behaviour ==
The territorial calls of Sitta przewalskii differ significantly from those of S. leucopsis, whose notes are more nasal, whereas the song of S. przewalskii is in long verses composed of whistles that ascend in pitch, interspersed with short notes. According to the Handbook of the Birds of the World, the calls include a "muffled, mellow 'chip' repeated in irregular series...; a loud, emphatic, whistled 'dweep' or 'dweep-eep'; a slightly nasal, querulous 'que', usually repeated 3–5 times...; and thinner 'pee-pee-pee-pee...' or 'seet-seet-seet-seet...' notes on [the] same pitch but slowing towards [the] end of [the] phrase."

In 1950, the English naturalist Frank Ludlow reported a description of the bird, provided to him by Ernst Schäfer who studied an adult male near Litang in 1934. It was noted as "one of the shyest and rarest denizens of the conifer forest", and one leading a solitary life, much like nearby populations of three-toed woodpeckers (Picoides tridactylus funebris). By contrast, Ludlow observed the species in southeastern Tibet, probably during the winter, and did not find it particularly reserved. He reports having killed a specimen in a willow, far from the species' usual coniferous nesting grounds. The specimen was captured on the outskirts of a forest, on a ridge between two valleys, where it stood on a dead branch from which it launched in pursuit of insects in flight, like a flycatcher.

== Distribution and habitat ==
The species is native to an area in west central China and southeastern Tibet. In China, it is found in eastern Qinghai, from the Daba Mountains as far north as the Menyuan Hui Autonomous County, and as far south as the plateau of Amdo (35° N. 101° E.), as well as in the southern part of Qinghai in Nangqên County; in the area of the Yellow River in Xinghai County; in Gansu, southwest of Xiahe and Min counties; in Sichuan, where it has been observed in the north, centre and west of the province, including sightings in Songpan County at the Jiuzhaigou Valley nature reserve, in the Qionglai Mountains in the Wolong District, in the region of Barkam County, and in the area of Litang. The species has also been observed in Kunming, Yunnan, in far southwestern China, where it most likely migrates to overwinter.

In Tibet, the species has been found in the northeastern Tibet Autonomous Region in the Chamdo Prefecture; and in the southeast of the region in Tse (in December) and in Dzeng (in April), both in the South Tibet (Tsangpo) Valley region. The Tsangpo Valley sightings may be anomalous, only indicating winter visitation. The bird observed in Dzeng was in an environment alien to the species' normal coniferous forest environs, and both the Dzeng and Tse individuals had atypically pale underparts, indicating they may have been nominate S. leucopsis, but with genetic introgression traits from Przevalski's nuthatch.

S. przewalskii inhabits coniferous montane forest of spruce or fir. Its altitudinal range commonly approaches the forest tree line. In China it has been observed at altitudes of 4,270 m (14,010 ft) (in Sichuan during August) and in Qinghai at 2,590–2,895 m (8,497–9,498 ft) and at approximately 2,250 m (7,380 ft) (during June). In Tibet individuals have been recorded at heights of 3,500–4,500 m (11,500–14,800 ft) in the northeast, and from 2,895–3,050 m (9,498–10,007 ft) in the southeast.

== Threats and protection ==
Sitta przewalskii is listed as Least Concern by the International Union for Conservation of Nature as of 2024. Although the population is believed to be declining, the decline is not considered severe enough to warrant listing as Vulnerable.

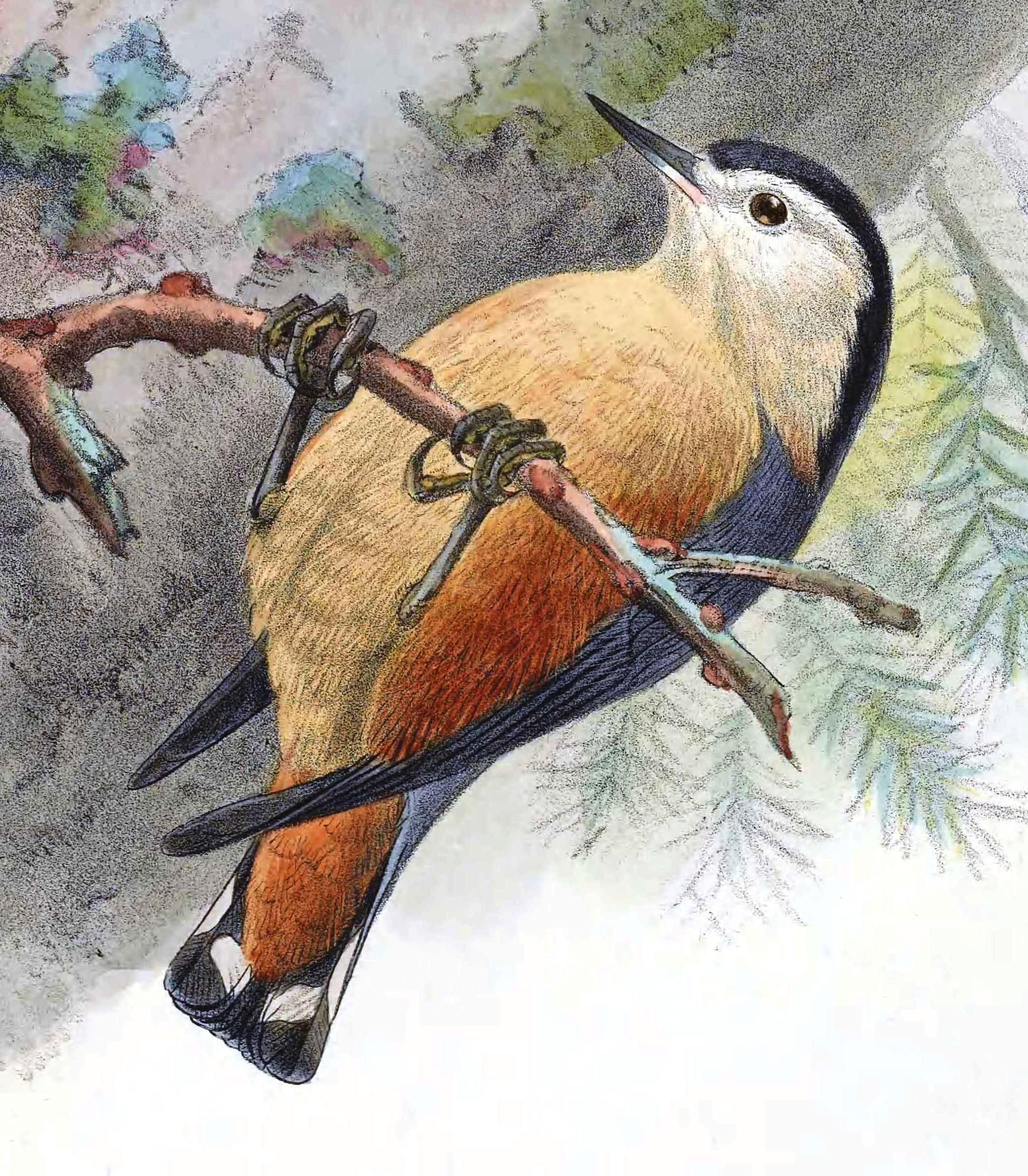
Illustration of S. przewalskii by Keulemans

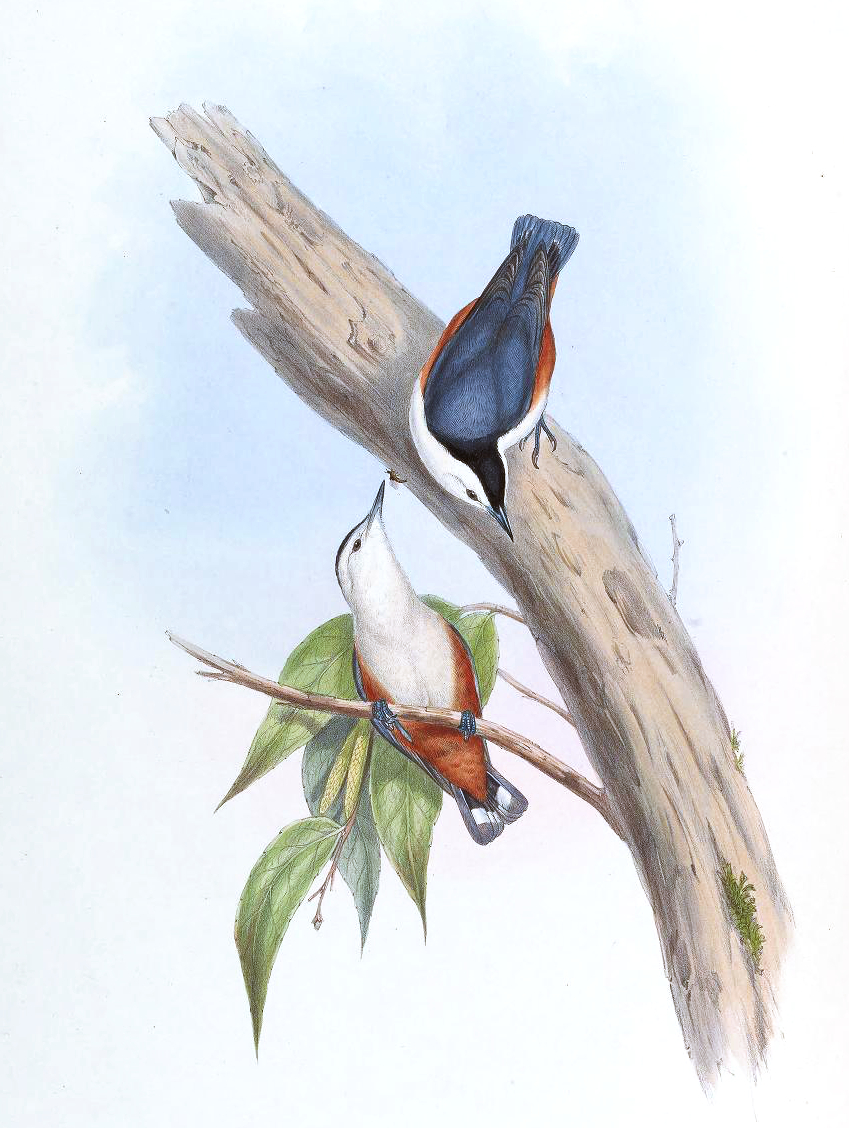
Illustration by Gould & Richter of a white-cheeked nuthatch pair, the closest relative of S przewalskii, showing its obviously whiter underparts

== Notes and references ==
=== Notes ===
1. As translated into English from Russian in 1899, after examining a specimen in 1884 or 1885, Berezovski described the bird as being "very close to Sitta leucopsis, differing, it would seem, only in being smaller and in having almost the entire underparts strongly rufescent."
2. The 21 species are out of 24 accepted as making up the genus by Harrap and Quinn in 1996. Of these, the study omitted the Indian nuthatch (Sitta castanea), the yellow-billed nuthatch (Sitta solangiae) and the white-browed nuthatch (Sitta victoriae). It treated S. przewalskii as a subspecies of S. leucopsis. The IOC accepted 29 species as of 2025, based on the elevation of five taxa from subspecies to full species status, including Przevalski's nuthatch, Bahama nuthatch, and three species from the europaea group.

== Bibliography ==
- Harrap, Simon (1996). Christopher Helm (ed.). Tits, Nuthatches and Treecreepers. Illustrated by David Quinn. Christopher Helm. ISBN 0-7136-3964-4.
- Matthysen, Erik (2010). The Nuthatches. Illustrated by David Quinn. A & C Black. ISBN 978-1-4081-2870-1.
