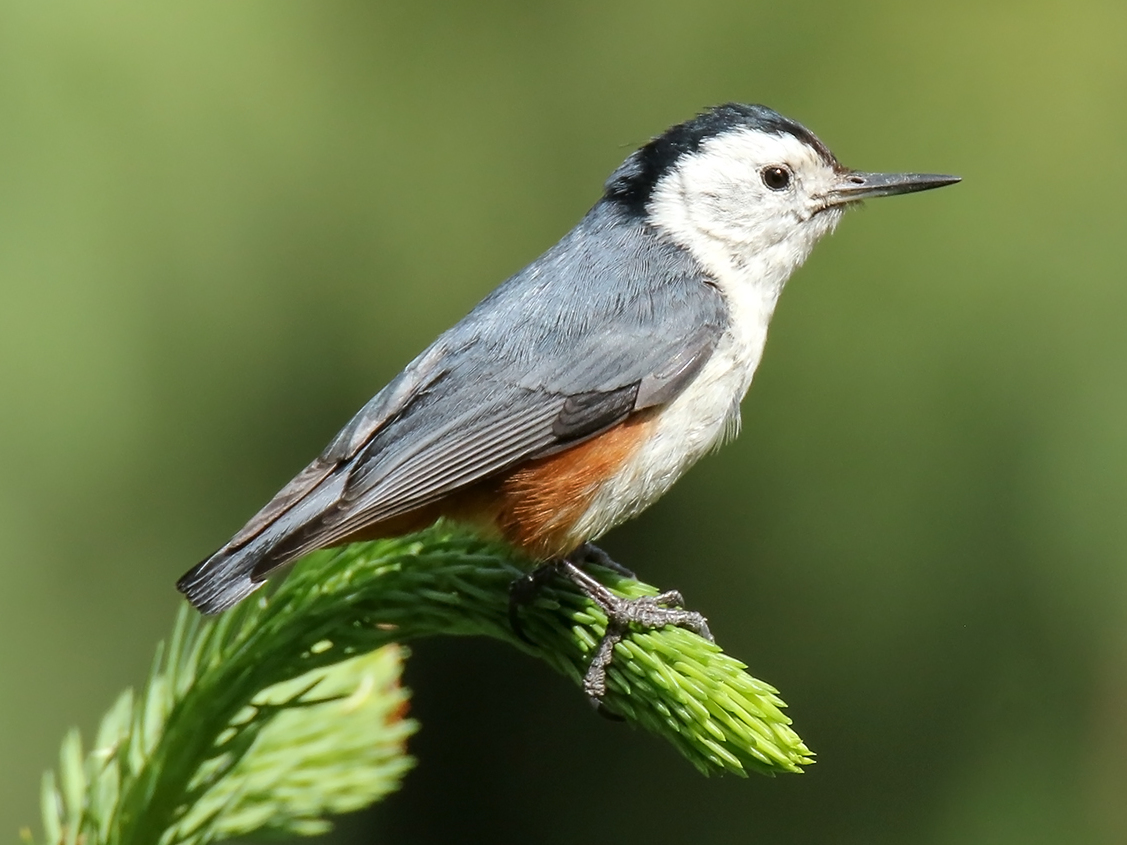
- At Naltar, Gilgit, Pakistan

Conservation status
- Least Concern (IUCN 3.1)

Scientific classification
- Kingdom: Animalia
- Phylum: Chordata
- Class: Aves
- Order: Passeriformes
- Family: Sittidae
- Genus: Sitta
- Species: S. leucopsis

Binomial name
- Sitta leucopsis Gould, 1850

= White-cheeked nuthatch =

Species of bird

The white-cheeked nuthatch (Sitta leucopsis) is a species of bird in the family Sittidae. It is found in Afghanistan, Bhutan, India, Nepal, and Pakistan.

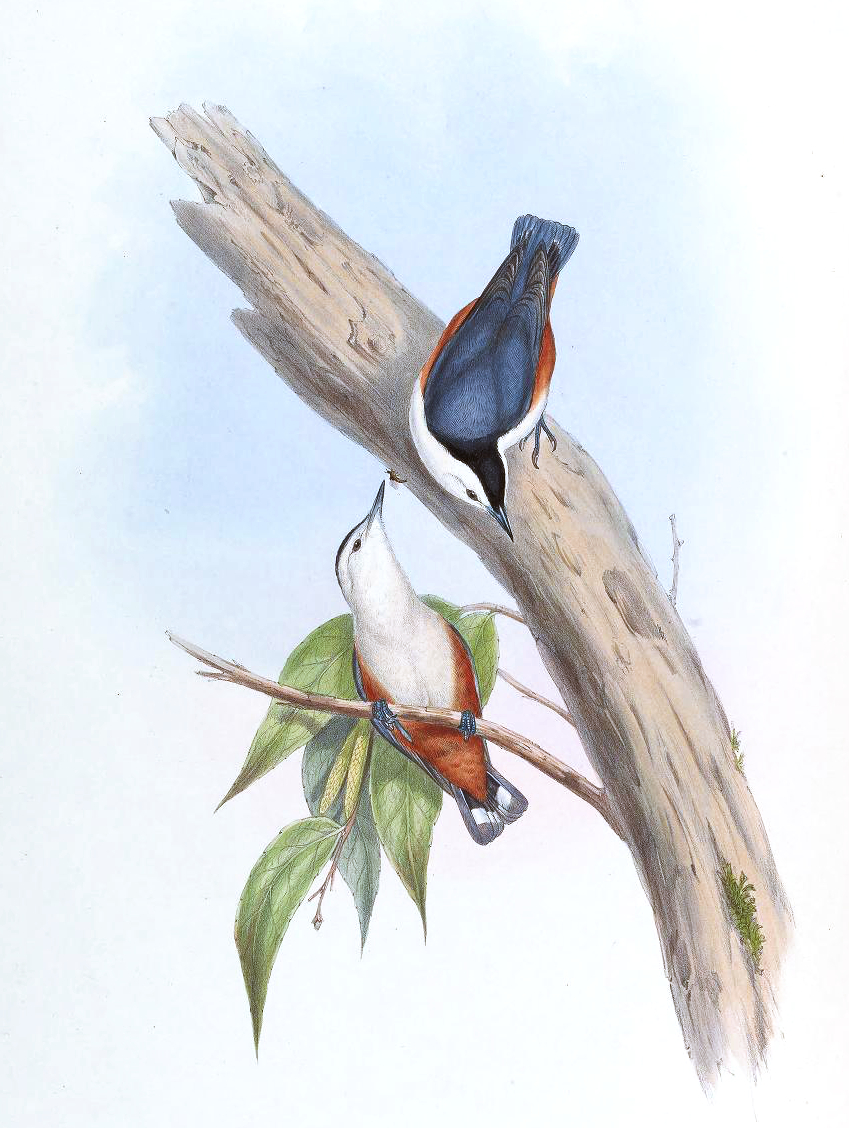
Illustration by John Gould and H. C. Richter

Its natural habitats are boreal forests and temperate forests.

== Description ==
It is 13 cm (5.1 in) long, white cheeks, chin, throat, and underparts, upper parts mostly dark grey.
