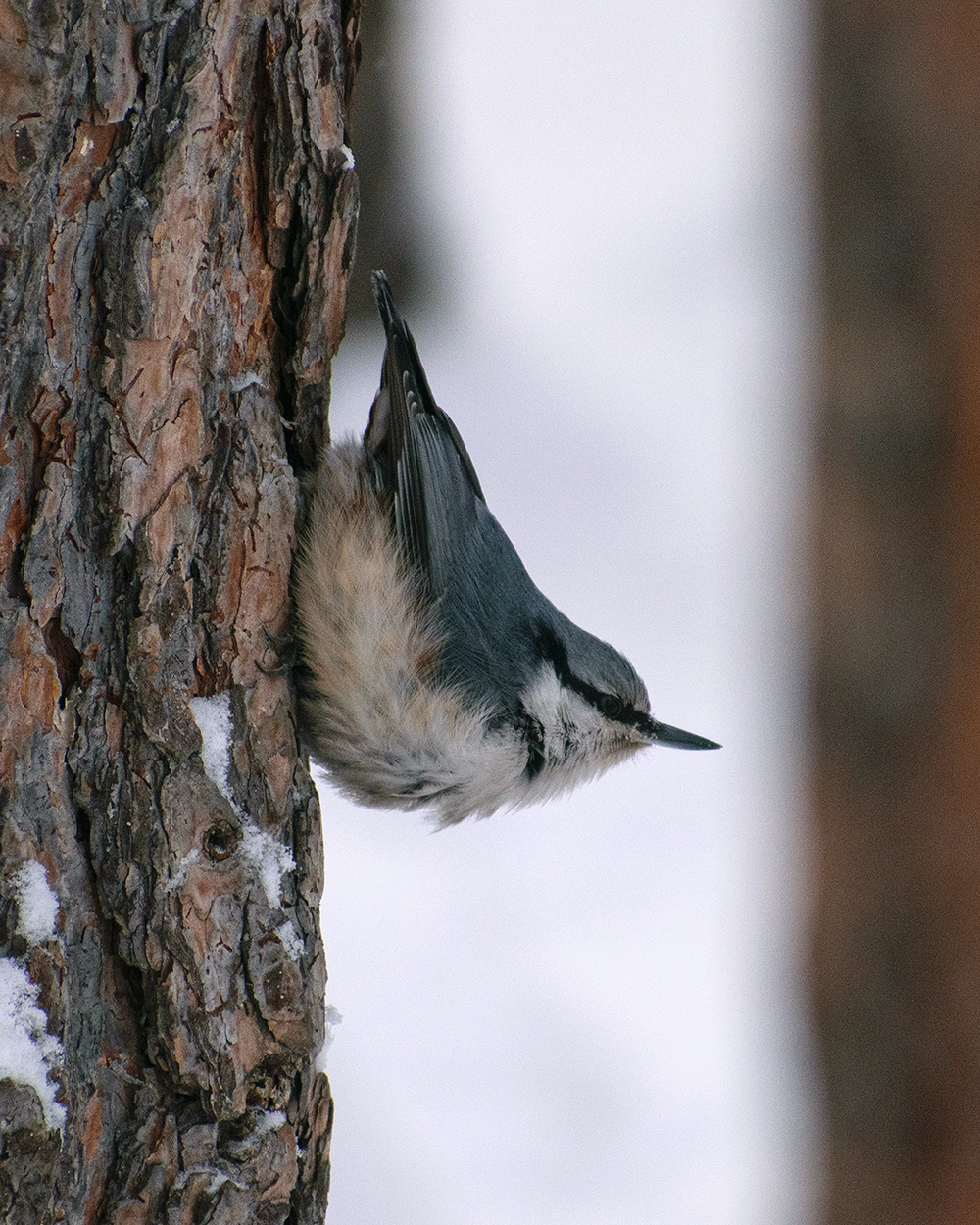
- Sitta arctica in Yakutsk

Conservation status
- Least Concern (IUCN 3.1)

Scientific classification
- Kingdom: Animalia
- Phylum: Chordata
- Class: Aves
- Order: Passeriformes
- Family: Sittidae
- Genus: Sitta
- Species: S. arctica

Binomial name
- Sitta arctica Buturlin, 1907
- Siberian nuthatch range

Synonyms
- Sitta europaea arctica Buturlin, 1907; Arctositta arctica (Buturlin, 1907)

= Siberian nuthatch =

Species of bird

The Siberian nuthatch (Sitta arctica) is a bird species of the family Sittidae. For a long time considered as a subspecies of the Eurasian nuthatch (S. europaea), it was clearly differentiated in 2006 on the basis of morphological and molecular characters. It is on average marginally larger than the Eurasian nuthatch (though with considerable overlap), and also differs in some morphological features such as the shape of its bill, the size of its claws and the colour of its underwing and outer rectrices. Its song has also been described as "distinctly different" from that of the Eurasian nuthatch, though without further clarification.

The Siberian nuthatch inhabits the forests northeast of Lake Baikal, up to the Bering Sea and the Sea of Okhotsk, but not near the coast. It lives in northeastern Siberia, barely exceeding the 105th meridian east in the west. It lives in Daurian larch (Larix gmelinii) stands on flood plains. The Siberian nuthatch has a wide range and its numbers are presumed to be stable, so the International Union for Conservation of Nature considers the bird to be of "least concern".

== Taxonomy ==
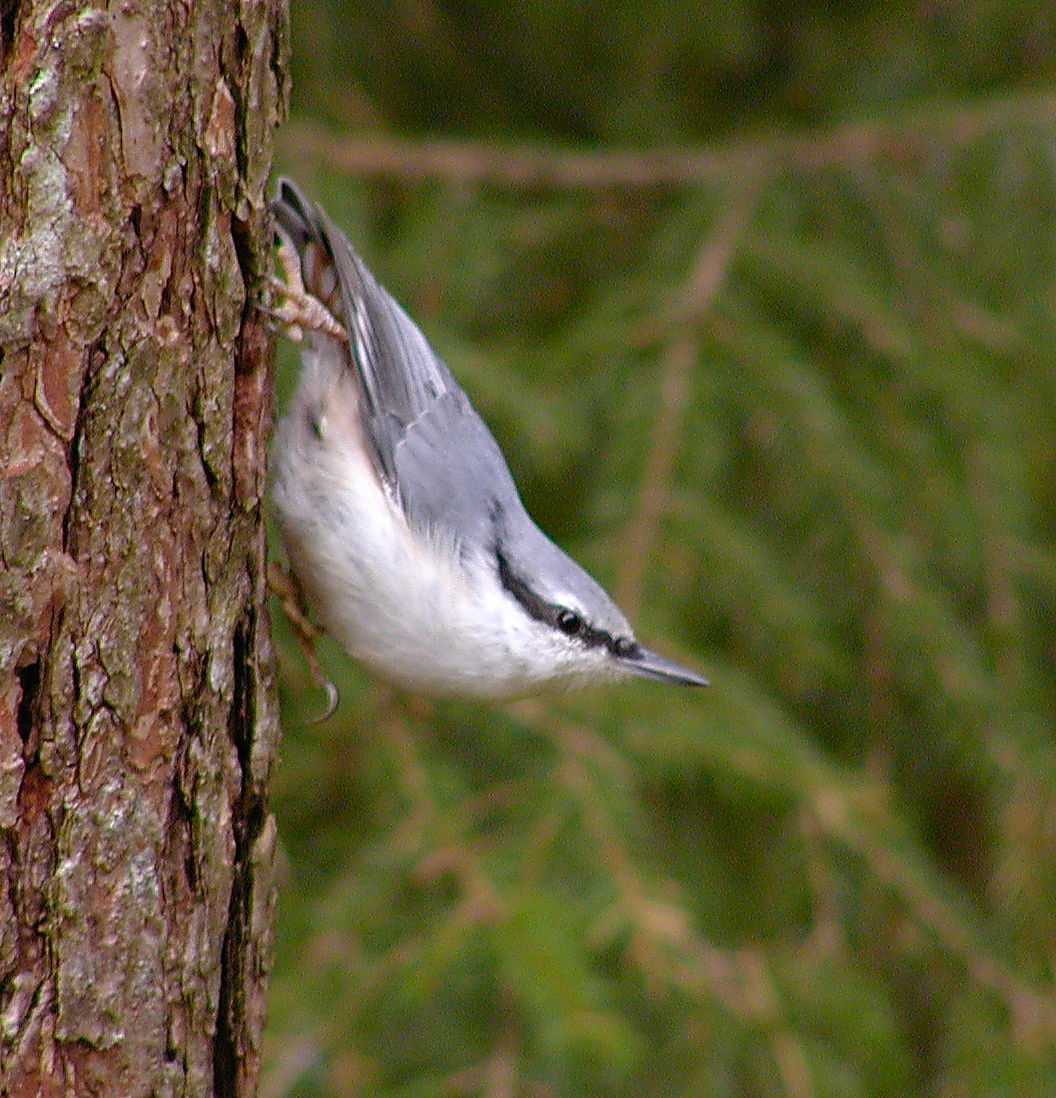
The Eurasian nuthatch, nominate subspecies S. e. europaea, strongly resembles the Siberian nuthatch, but they are not particularly closely related among the nuthatches.

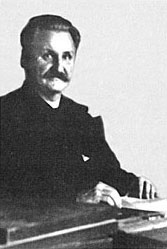
Sergei Buturlin described the Siberian nuthatch in 1907.

The Siberian nuthatch was described in 1907 under its current name S. arctica by the Russian ornithologist Sergei Buturlin, based on a specimen (holotype) from Verkhoyansk. In 1916, Buturlin proposed a division of the family Sittidae into several subfamilies, genera and subgenera. He later, in 1916, placed Sitta arctica within a monotypic genus, Arctositta Buturlin, 1916, judging that its morphology is sufficiently distinct from other nuthatches. In 1928, German ornithologist Otto Kleinschmidt linked the genus Arctositta to the Eurasian nuthatch group (S. europaea), and the Siberian nuthatch was subsequently considered a subspecies Sitta europaea arctica of the Eurasian nuthatch.

In 2006, ornithologists Yaroslav Red'kin and Maria Konovalova published a comprehensive review of the East Asian subspecies of the Eurasian nuthatch, proposing the subspecies S. e. arctica to be restored to species status, in recognition of its clearly distinct morphology from the other subspecies, and the fact that the Siberian nuthatch lives in partial sympatry with Sitta europaea while showing little or no hybridisation. The decision was followed by the ornithologists Nigel J. Collar and John D. Pilgrim in 2007 and taken up by the International Ornithological Congress in its version 1.6 (30 June 2008). The split was also accepted by the British Ornithologists' Union in 2012. These morphological analyses are consistent with mitochondrial DNA analyses also performed in 2006, which showed a large divergence (10% for the ND2 gene) between S. arctica and S. europaea. German ornithologist Hans Edmund Wolters proposed the division of the genus Sitta into subgenera in 1975–1982. The Siberian nuthatch is placed in Sitta (Sitta) (Linnaeus, 1758). According to the International Ornithological Congress and Alan P. Peterson, no subspecies are distinguished.

=== Phylogeny ===
In 2020, a phylogeny of the genus Sitta was published, which uses three mitochondrial and two nuclear genes. The three species from South Asia (Indian, Chestnut-bellied and Burmese nuthatches) are found to be related to the Kashmir nuthatch, but surprisingly, the Siberian nuthatch is recovered in its own branch that is quite distant from the Eurasian nuthatch of which it was long considered a subspecies.

This phylogeny is summarised in the simplified cladogram below:

- - Western rock nuthatch (Sitta neumayer)
  - Eastern rock nuthatch (Sitta tephronota)
- - Siberian nuthatch (Sitta arctica)
  - - - White-browed nuthatch (Sitta victoriae)
      - White-tailed nuthatch (Sitta himalayensis)
    - Eurasian nuthatch (Sitta europaea)

=== Biogeography ===
In 1996, the Russian ornithologist Vladimir Leonovitch and his collaborators proposed a biogeographical hypothesis to explain the differentiation of nuthatches in northeast Siberia. During the Pleistocene glaciations, certain glacial refuges seem to have allowed the survival of at least parts of the Siberian fauna and flora. Populations related to Sitta europaea could have survived in these refuges, in this case the Anadyr basin, where Sitta arctica could have differentiated, and southern Kamchatka, where the subspecies S. e. albifrons could have diverged from the other subspecies of the Eurasian nuthatch.

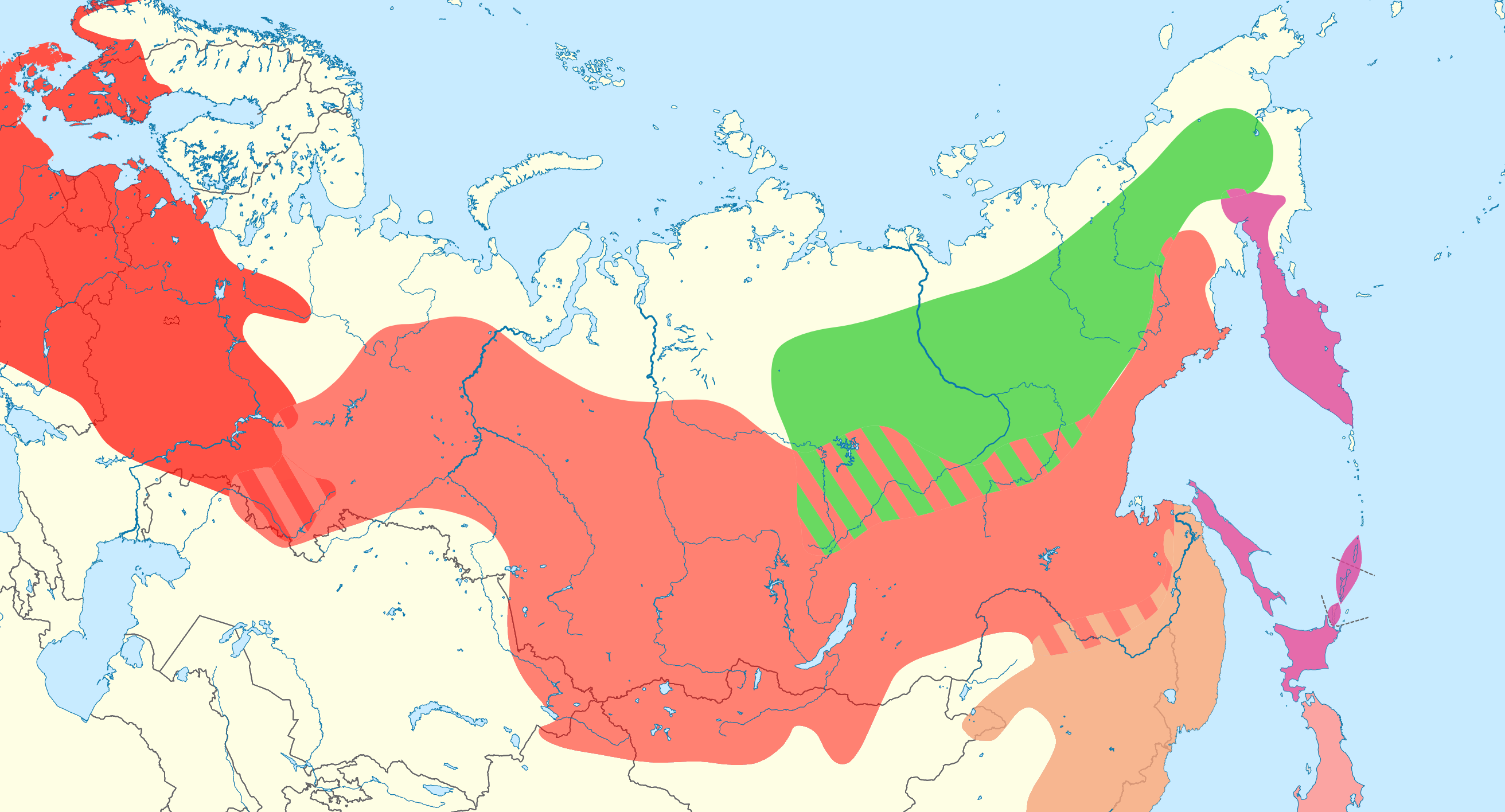
Distribution map of the Siberian nuthatch and the different subspecies of the Eurasian nuthatch in Asia.
Sitta arctica
Sitta europaea europaea
Sitta europaea asiatica
Sitta europaea albifrons
Sitta europaea amurensis
Sitta europaea amurensis form "hondoensis"

== Description ==
The Siberian nuthatch is a medium-sized nuthatch, measuring about 15 cm (5.9 in) in length. The upperparts are bluish-grey and the underparts brilliant white. It is quite similar to the white-breasted subspecies of the Eurasian nuthatch encountered in the most northern regions of Eurasia, but is distinguished by its marginally larger average size and by several anatomical particularities that are more or less easy to identify. The upperparts are dull blue-grey, as in the subspecies S. europaea amurensis, but darker than in all other Eurasian nuthatch subspecies. The eyestripe is black, thinner and shorter than in the latter. Red'kin and Konovalova of the Moscow Museum say there is no clear mark on the forehead and above this black line, although such a mark is present in some subspecies of S. europaea. Unlike S. europaea, the rufous brown of the rump extends further down the flanks; the underwing-coverts are dark grey (not pale), the outer rectrices are white for more than half their length, and there is no apparent sexual dimorphism.

The bill is longer and narrower than in the various subspecies of the Eurasian nuthatch, with its upper margin completely or almost straight and its lower margin curved upward. The base of the bill is densely covered with long feathers. The wing is more pointed than in the Eurasian nuthatch, and the seventh primary remige is equal in size to the second, whereas it is smaller than the latter in the Eurasian nuthatch. The tarsus is shorter (in absolute terms) than in all subspecies of the European nuthatch, but the hind claw is clearly more developed, equalling the remainder of its toe in length (around 10 mm (0.39 in)). The male averages 14.8 cm (5.8 in), while the female averages 15.1 cm (5.9 in), with wingspans of 25.7 cm (10.1 in) and 25.2 cm (9.9 in), respectively. In males and females, respectively, the folded wing averages 86.4 mm (3.40 in) and 83.9 mm (3.30 in), the bill 18.6 mm (0.73 in) and 19.1 mm (0.75 in), the tail 49.9 mm (1.96 in) and 46.7 mm (1.84 in), and the tarsus 17.0 mm (0.67 in) and 16.9 mm (0.67 in). Seven adult males weighed between 17.2–23.5 g (0.61–0.83 oz) (average 21.2 g (0.75 oz)) and two females weighed 19.7 g (0.69 oz) and 22.1 g (0.78 oz).

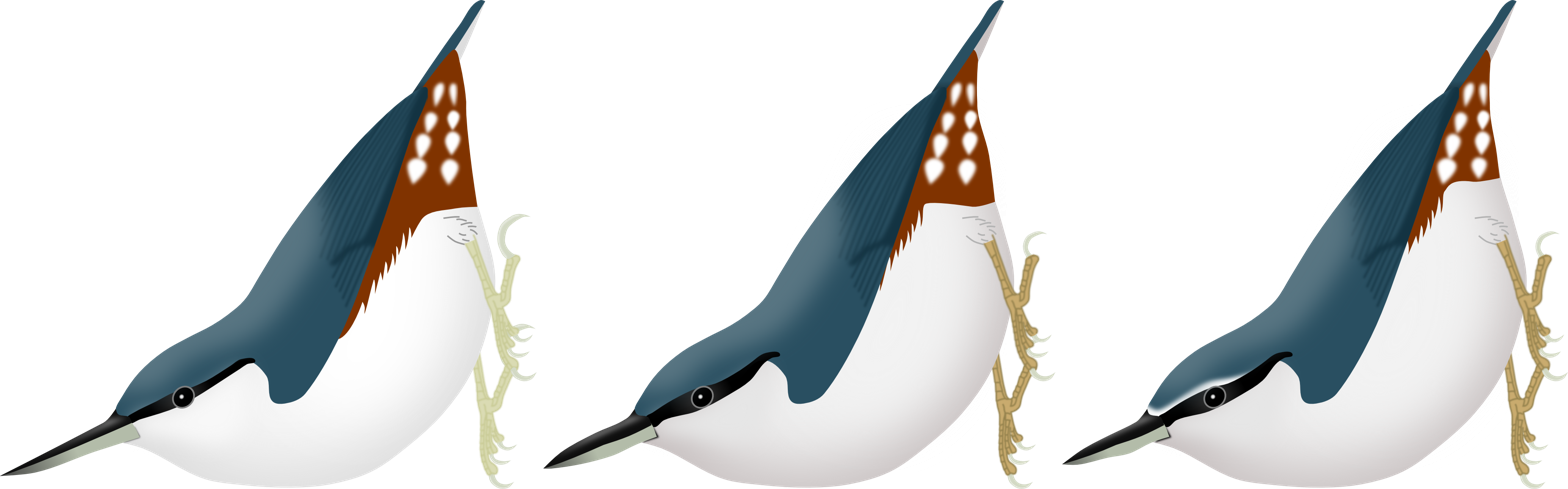
From left to right, Sitta arctica, S. europaea europaea and S. e. asiatica. In the Siberian nuthatch, note the straight, thin beak, the finer and shorter black loral line, the reddish rump extending over the flanks and the large rear claw.

== Ecology and behaviour ==
During fall and winter, the Siberian nuthatch migrates, forming mixed-species foraging flocks with the Eurasian nuthatch subspecies S. e. asiatica and S. e. baicalensis.

=== Vocalisations ===
The Siberian nuthatch's song is powerful. Some sonograms of calls and songs of the Siberian nuthatch were published in 1996, and the voice is described as "distinctly different" from that of the Eurasian nuthatch, but without further specification.

=== Breeding ===
Available data on the ecology of the species are very patchy. Observations in 1994 showed that pairs had already formed by 15 May. Like other nuthatches, notably the Eurasian nuthatch, this species occasionally reuses the nest of a Great spotted woodpecker (Dendrocopos major) and plasters the entrance with mud in order to reduce its diameter. The young observed fledged between 30 June and 4 July.

== Distribution and habitat ==
The Siberian nuthatch is endemic to Russia and lives in central and northeastern Siberia. In the west, its distribution begins around the 105th meridian east, near the upper reaches of the Nizhnyaya Tunguska River and Vilyuy River in the north (to around the 65th or 67th parallel north) and those of the Lena River in the south. In the east it does not go beyond the lower reaches of the Anadyr River, the northwestern Koryak Mountains and the sources of the Punjina River. The distribution does not reach any coastal areas, neither the Bering Sea nor the Sea of Okhotsk. The main part of its distribution ends in the south, where the distribution of the Eurasian nuthatch subspecies asiatica begins, and in the east it is replaced in the Kamchatka peninsula by S. e. albifrons.

The Siberian nuthatch inhabits Daurian larch (Larix gmelinii) forests primarily on floodplains.

The species is nomadic in winter, and has been recorded as a vagrant as far west as northern Europe.

== Status and threats ==
The threat level of the Siberian nuthatch is assessed by the International Union for Conservation of Nature in October 2016, which considers the species to be of "least concern". Indeed, according to BirdLife International data the range of this bird is vast, covering 3,910,000 km^{2} (1,510,000 sq mi), and its population is large and stable, not warranting the assumption of a higher threat level.
