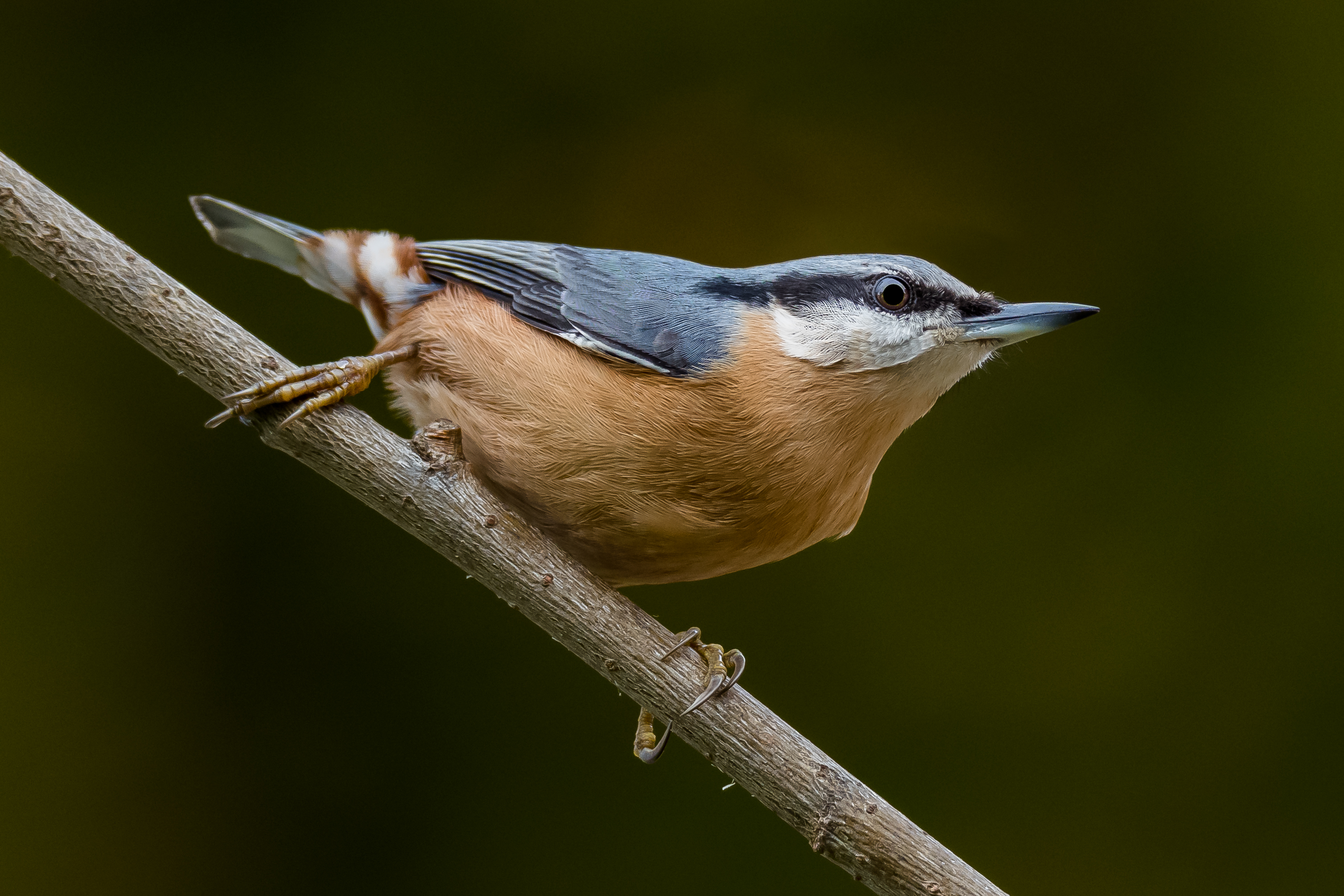
- S. e. caesia in Central Europe Song recorded in Surrey, England Call recorded in Surrey, England

Conservation status
- Least Concern (IUCN 3.1)

Scientific classification
- Kingdom: Animalia
- Phylum: Chordata
- Class: Aves
- Order: Passeriformes
- Family: Sittidae
- Genus: Sitta
- Species: S. europaea

Binomial name
- Sitta europaea Linnaeus, 1758
- Range of S. europaea Resident

= Eurasian nuthatch =

Small passerine bird species

The Eurasian nuthatch, wood nuthatch (Sitta europaea), or simply nuthatch, is a small passerine bird found throughout the Palearctic and in Eurasia. Like other nuthatches, it is a short-tailed bird with a long bill, blue-gray upperparts and a black eye-stripe. It is a vocal bird with a repeated loud dwip call. There are more than 20 subspecies in three main groups; birds in the west of the range have orange-buff underparts and a white throat, those in Russia have whitish underparts, and those in the east have a similar appearance to European birds, but lack the white throat.

Its preferred habitat is mature deciduous or mixed woodland with large, old trees, preferably oak. Pairs hold permanent territories, and nest in tree holes, usually old woodpecker nests, but sometimes natural cavities. If the entrance to the hole is too large, the female plasters it with mud to reduce its size, and often coats the inside of the cavity too. The six to nine red-speckled white eggs are laid on a deep base of pine or other wood chips.

The Eurasian nuthatch eats mainly insects, particularly caterpillars and beetles, although in autumn and winter its diet is supplemented with nuts and seeds. The young are fed mainly on insects, with some seeds, food items mainly being found on tree trunks and large branches. The nuthatch can forage when descending trees head first, as well as when climbing. It readily visits bird tables, eating fatty man-made food items as well as seeds. It is an inveterate hoarder, storing food year-round. Its main natural predator is the Eurasian sparrowhawk.

Fragmentation of woodland can lead to local losses of breeding birds, but the species's range is still expanding. It has a large population and huge breeding area, and is therefore classified by the International Union for Conservation of Nature (IUCN) as being of least concern.

== Taxonomy ==
The nuthatches are a family of similar-looking birds with short tails and wings, compact bodies and longish pointed bills. They have grey or bluish upperparts, a black eyestripe and strong feet. All are in the single genus Sitta. Within the genus, the Eurasian nuthatch forms a superspecies with the chestnut-vented, Indian, chestnut-bellied and Kashmir nuthatches and has in the past been considered conspecific with all of these.

The Eurasian nuthatch was described by Carl Linnaeus in his landmark 1758 10th edition of Systema Naturae under its current scientific name. Sitta is derived from the Ancient Greek name for this bird, σίττη, sittē, and the species name, europaea, is Latin for "European". "Nuthatch", first recorded in 1350, is derived from "nut" and a word probably related to "hack", since these birds hack at nuts they have wedged into crevices.

In 2014, Eric Pasquet and colleagues published a phylogeny based on examination of nuclear and mitochondrial DNA of 21 nuthatch species. The group europaea is related to the two nuthatches of rocky environments, the Western rock nuthatch (S. neumayer) and the Eastern rock nuthatch (S. tephronota), and these two clades diverge from each other by thirteen million years. Within the group europaea, the white-tailed nuthatch (S. himalayensis)—and consequently the white-browed nuthatch (S. victoriae), although not included in the study—appears to be basal, and the Eurasian nuthatch is closely related to the chestnut-vented nuthatch (S. nagaensis) and the Kashmir nuthatch (S. cashmirensis). The Indian Nuthatch (S. castanea), the Beautiful nuthatch (S. cinnamoventris), the Burmese nuthatch (S. neglecta), and the Siberian nuthatch (S. arctica) are not included in the study. All the species of the group "europaea" masonry the entrance to their nests. In 2020, a new phylogeny will appear, covering the genus more exhaustively; it includes, in particular, the four species mentioned above. It uses three mitochondrial genes and two nuclear ones. The three species from the south of the Asian continent (Indian, Beautiful and Burmese nuthatches) are related to the Kashmir nuthatch, but surprisingly, the Siberian nuthatch is located on a clean branch, quite distant from the Eurasian nuthatch, from which it was nevertheless long considered a subspecies.

The study by Päckert and colleagues (2020) also includes a fairly exhaustive sampling of the Eurasian nuthatch subspecies. It highlights three large groups of subspecies, not perfectly overlapping with the traditionally distinguished groups on the basis of the coloring of their lower parts. A first group concerns the "European nuthatch", which includes all the European subspecies, whether buff-bellied or white-bellied, as well as the subspecies of the Near East. It is related to the group of the "Asian Nuthatch", including the subspecies inhabiting the northern part of the Asian continent, from Kazakhstan to Korea and Japan, all white-bellied. Finally, a third group of subspecies, the "Eastern nuthatch," includes the Asian subspecies living further south, in North and East China and in Taiwan.

The fossil record for nuthatches is sparse, and in Europe is limited to the extinct Sitta senogalliensis from the Lower Miocene in Italy and somewhat later material from France; the family appears to be of relatively recent origin.

=== Subspecies ===
There are more than 20 subspecies, but the precise number is disputed. These taxa can be divided into three main groups; these may have been geographically isolated from each other until relatively recently. Birds of intermediate appearance occur where the group ranges overlap.

Subspecies
Subspecies group	Appearance	Range	Subspecies (Note: Harrop and Quinn lump S. e. baicalensis, S. e. takatsukasai, S. e. clara and S. e. hondoensis into S. e. asiatica and S. e. formosana into S. e. sinensis)
caesia group	Buff breast, white throat	Most of Europe, North Africa, Middle East	S. e. caesia, S. e. hispaniensis, S. e. cisalpina, S. e. levantina, S. e. persica, S. e. rubiginosa, S. e. caucasica
europaea group	White breast	Scandinavia and Russia east to Japan and northern China	S. e. europaea, S. e. asiatica, S. e. arctica, S. e. baicalensis, S. e. albifrons, S. e. sakhalinensis, S. e. takatsukasai, S. e. clara, S. e. amurensis, S. e. hondoensis, S. e. roseilia, S. e. bedfordi, S. e. seorsa
sinensis group	Buff breast and throat	South and east China, Taiwan	S. e. sinensis, S. e. formosana

The large, white-breasted S. e. arctica of north east Siberia is distinctive in appearance and genetically, and may be another subspecies group or even a separate species.

Sitta europaea asiatica, with white eyebrow and base of forehead. The reddish-brown rump is not very extensive.

Sitta europaea europaea, white-bellied individual, as in Scandinavia and western Russia.

Sitta europaea caesia, found in mainland Europe.

Sitta europaea sinensis, subspecies with strongly colored underparts.

== Description ==
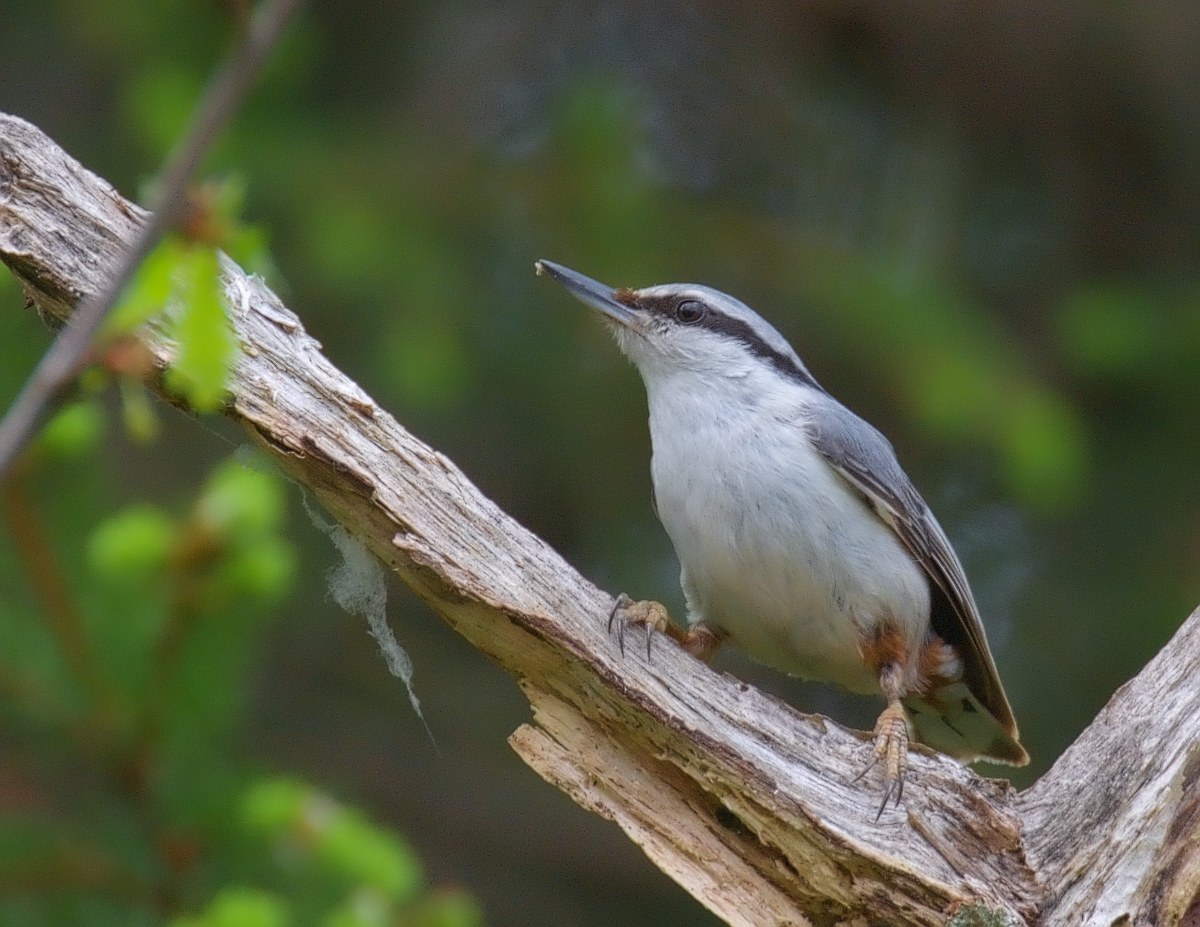
Female S. e. europaea in Sweden

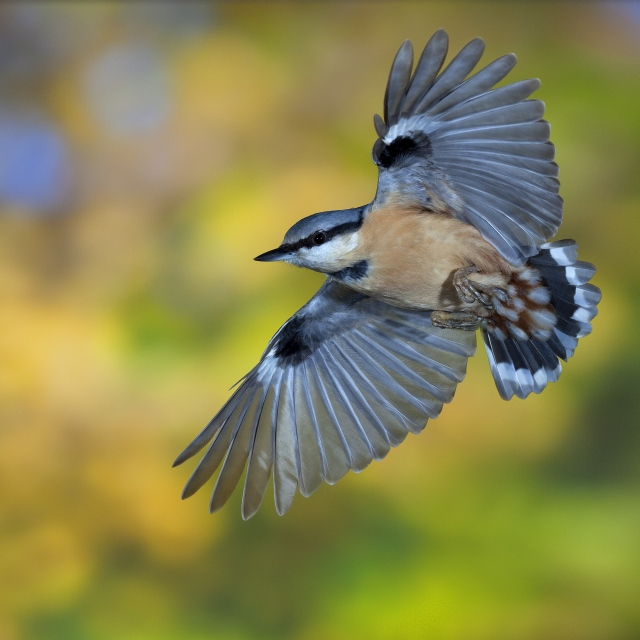
An individual of the subspecies Sitta europaea caesia in flight.

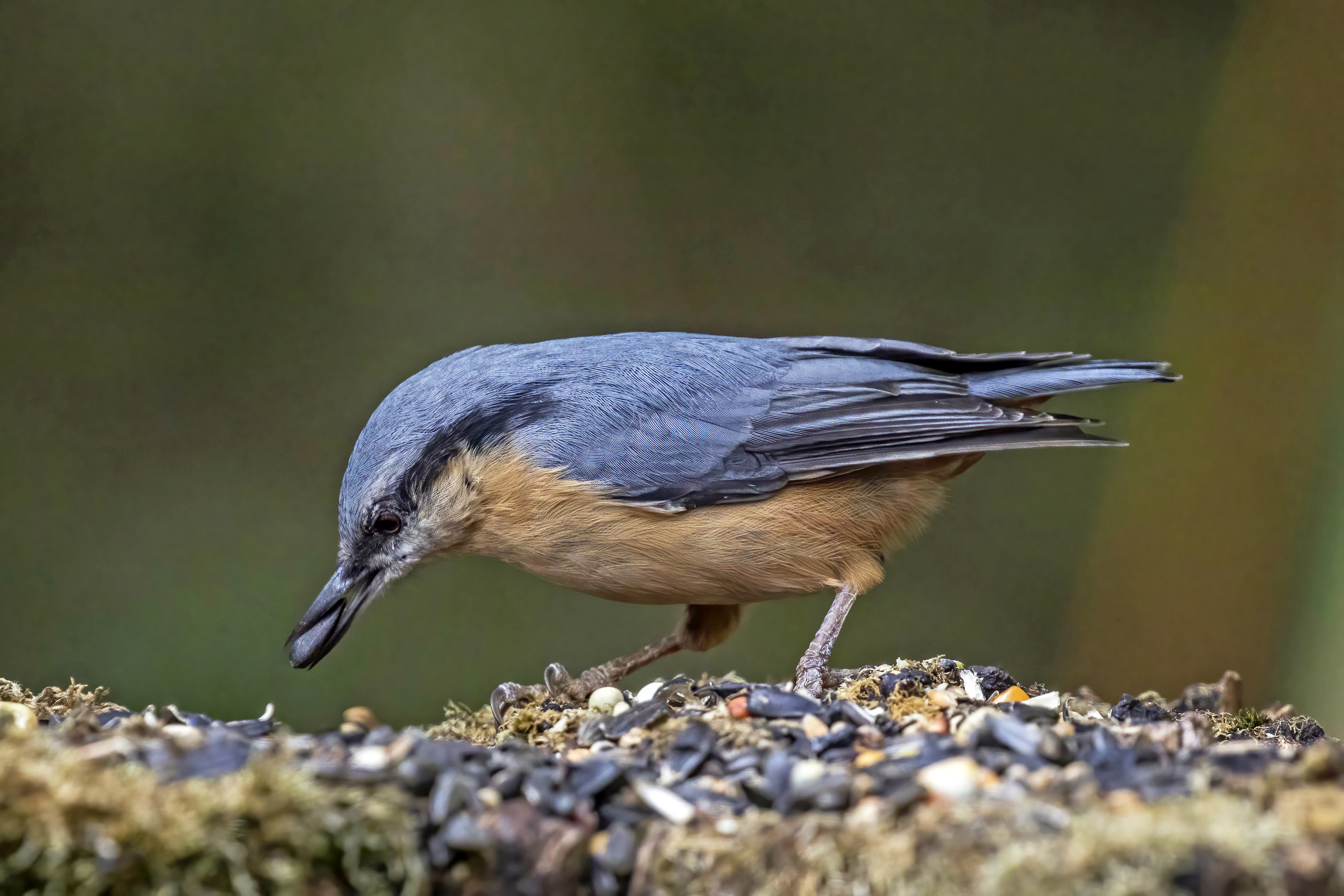
Eating seeds in Hungary

The adult male of the nominate subspecies, S. e. europaea is 14 cm (5.5 in) long with a 22.5–27 cm (8.9–10.6 in) wingspan. It weighs 17–28 g (0.6–1 oz). It has blue-grey upperparts, a black eye-stripe and whitish throat and underparts. The flanks and lower belly are orange-red, mottled with white on the undertail. The stout bill is dark grey with a paler area on the base of the lower mandible, the iris is dark brown and the legs and feet are pale brown or greyish. Most other members of the S. e. europaea group differ only in detail from the nominate form, often with respect to the hue of the underparts, but S. e. arctica is quite distinctive. It is large, pale, has a white forehead and a reduced eye-stripe, and it has more white in the tail and wings than any other subspecies. Nuthatches move on trees with short leaps, and do not use their tails for support. In flight, they have a characteristic appearance, with a pointed head, round wings and a short, square tail. Their flight is fast, with wings closed between beats, and is usually of short duration.

S. e. caesia, the most widespread of the western subspecies, has orange-buff underparts except for a white throat and cheeks. The other western forms mainly differ in the exact shade of the underparts, although some southeastern forms also show a white forehead and supercilium. S. e. sinensis and S. e. formosana, of China and Taiwan respectively, have buff underparts like the western races, but have buff, instead of white, throats.

The female is similar in appearance to the male, but may be identified by her slightly paler upperparts, a browner eyestripe and a more washed-out tone to the flanks and lower belly. In the eastern form, S. e. asiatica, some males have buff underparts like the female, and birds with this appearance are difficult to sex in the field. Young birds resemble the female, although their plumage is duller and they have paler legs. Individuals can be reliably sexed as female from about 12 days old by their paler and buffer flanks, or, in some white-breasted subspecies, by the creamier hue of their underparts.

Adults have a complete moult after breeding which takes about 80 days, starting from late May onwards and finishing by late September. The moult period for Siberian birds is more compressed, running from June to mid-September. Fledged juveniles moult some of their wing coverts when they are about eight weeks old.

=== Similar species ===
In most of its range, the Eurasian nuthatch is the only nuthatch present. In Southeast Europe and Western Asia, the western rock nuthatch (S. neumayer) inhabits rocky environments and is paler than the Eurasian nuthatch without white spots on its tail. The eastern rock nuthatch (S. tephronota) is larger than the western rock nuhatch with a thicker black eyestripe and ranges further east, not inhabiting Europe. Krüper's nuthatch (S. krueperi) inhabits Turkey, the Caucasus and Lesbos, largely following the distribution of Turkish pine (Pinus brutia). It is smaller than the Eurasian nuthatch, with a dark crown and a large russet patch on the breast. The Corsican nuthatch (S. whiteheadi) is endemic to Corsica and is the only nuthatch species in its range. In southwest China, the chestnut-vented nuthatch (S. nagaensis) is very similar to the Eurasian nuthatch, but has darker upperparts, less white on the face, and more greyish underparts. The Siberian nuthatch (S. arctica) was once considered a subspecies of the Eurasian nuthatch but differs quite clearly from it, being larger and paler, with a shorter and thinner eye line, a longer bill and a straighter culmen, and more white in the tail than any other subspecies.

Other nuthatches whose range overlaps with the Eurasian nuthatch

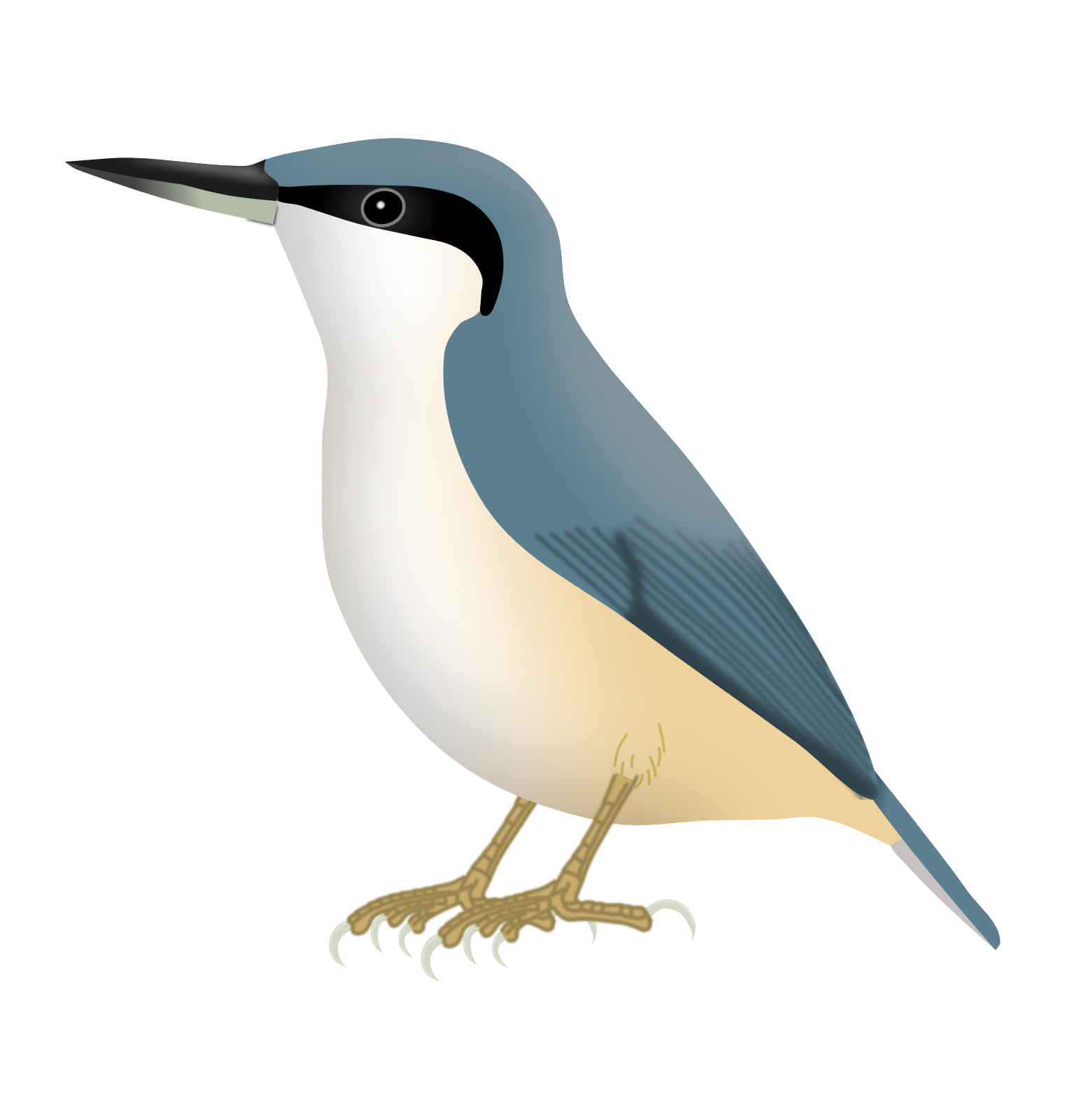
Eastern rock nuthatch (S. tephronota)

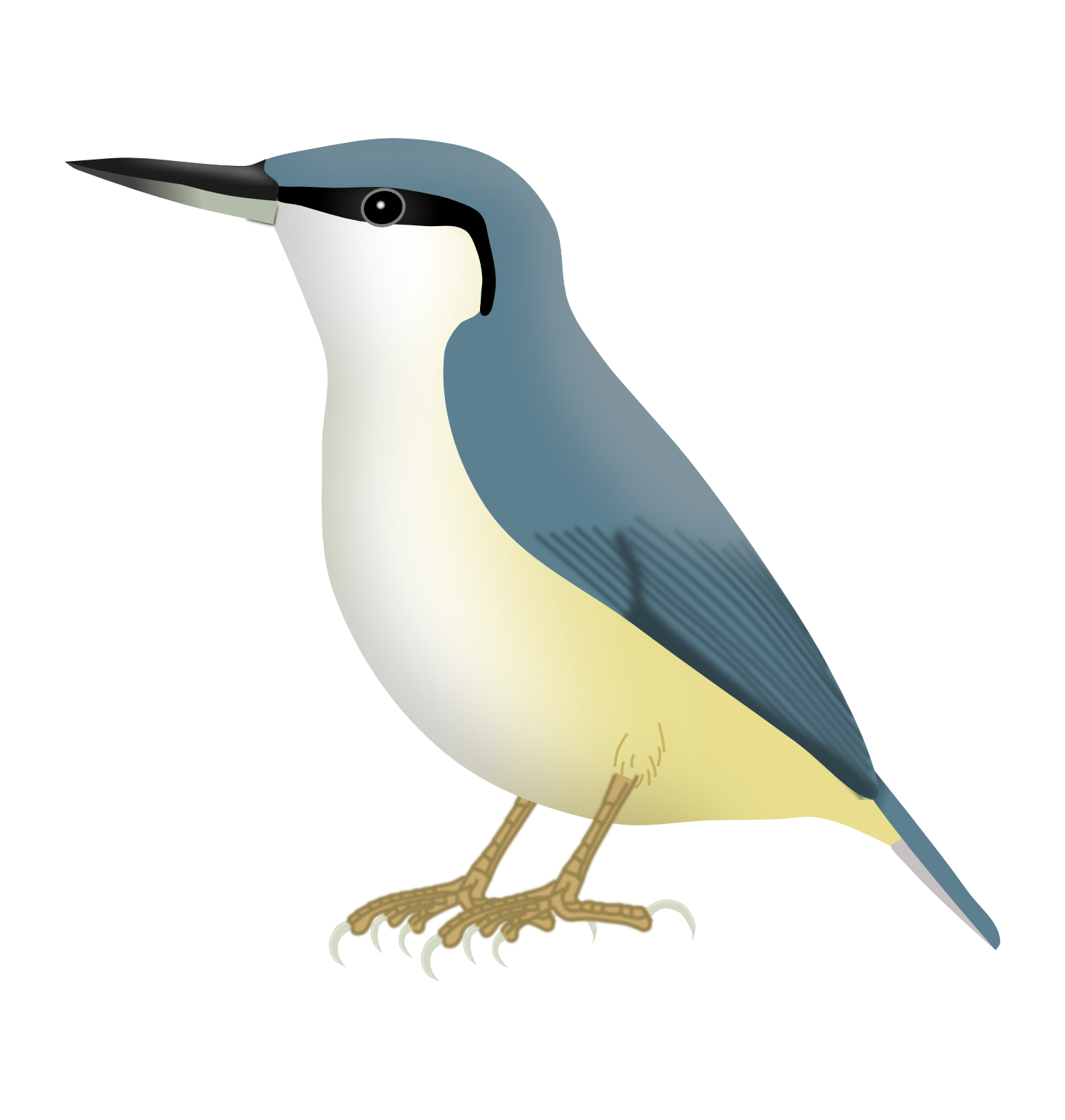
Western rock nuthatch (S. neumayer)

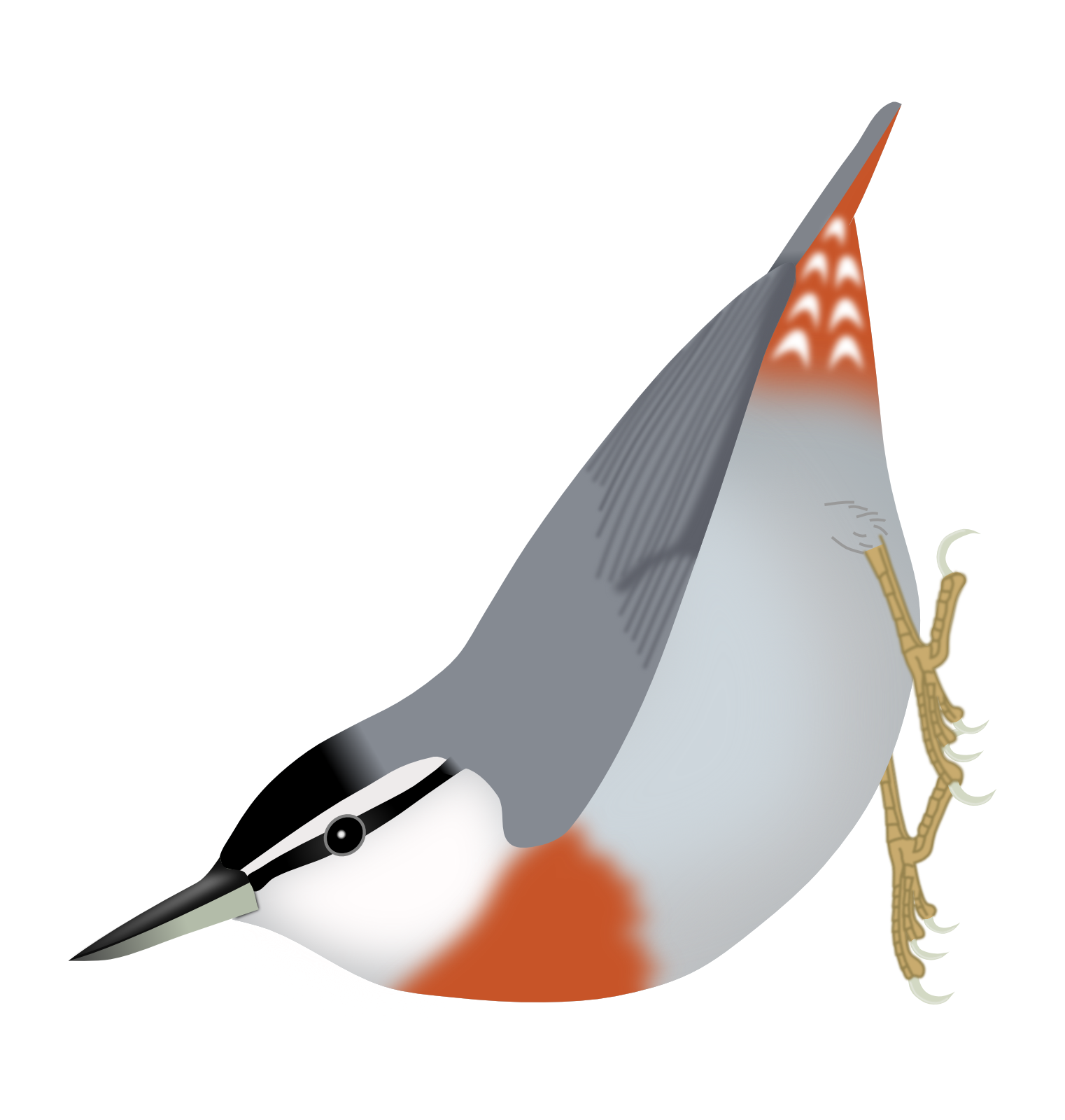
Krüper's nuthatch (S. krueperi)

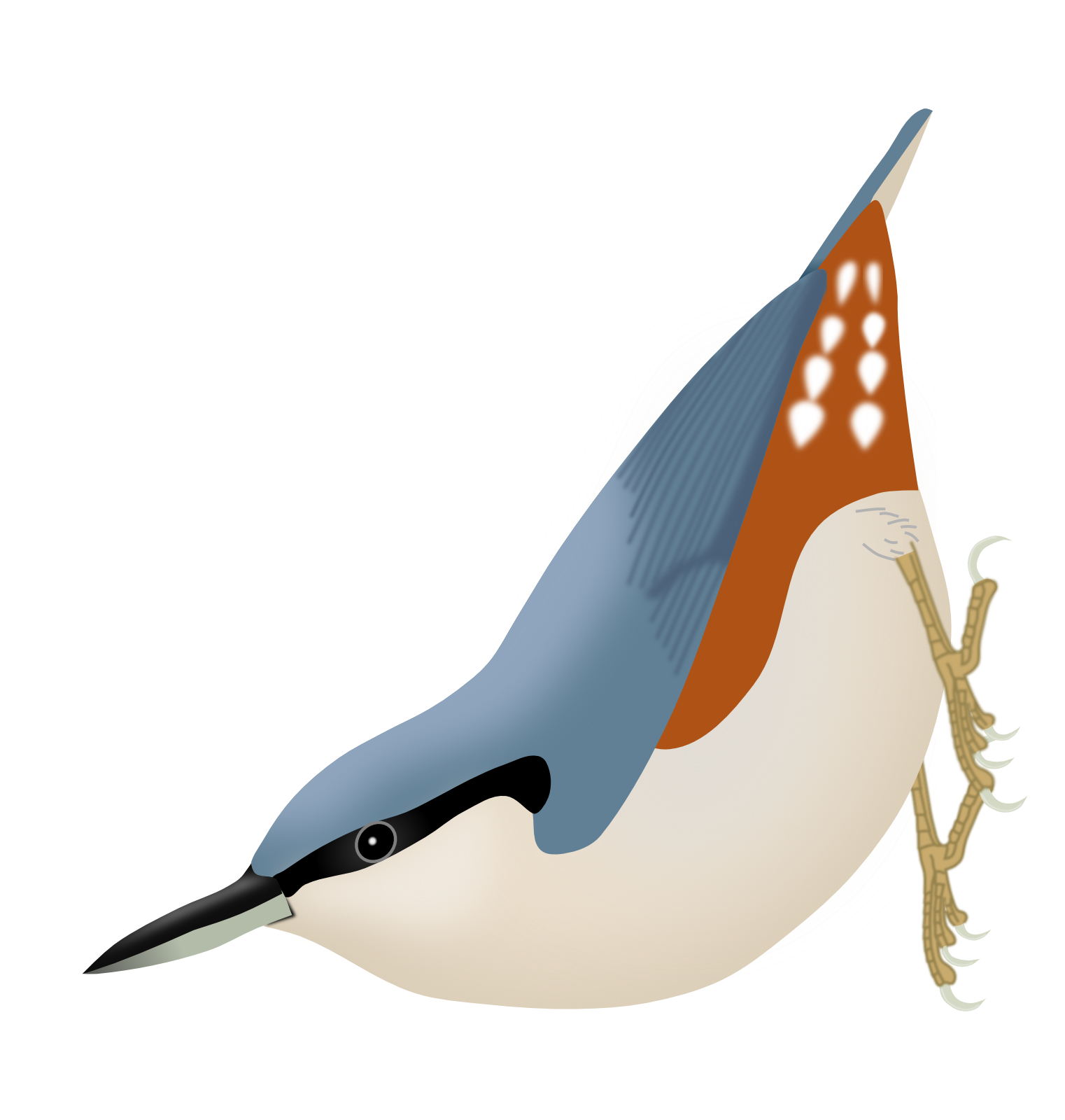
Chestnut-vented nuthatch (S. nagaensis)

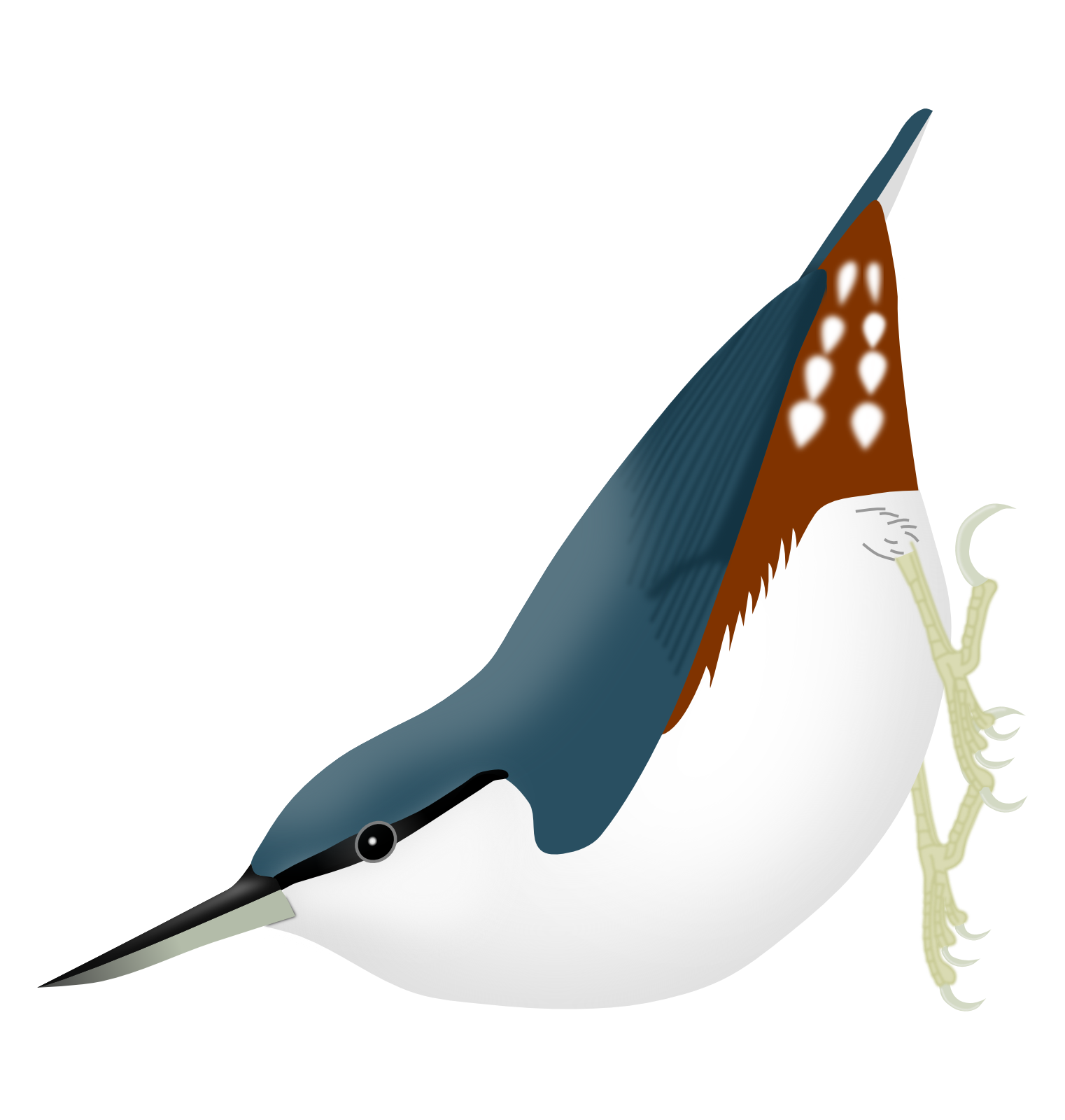
Siberian nuthatch (S. arctica)

=== Voice ===
The Eurasian nuthatch calls frequently, usually with a loud, sharp dwip normally repeated twice, sometimes more often if excited. It has a shrill sirrrr or tsi-si-si alarm call, and a thin tsit pre-flight call. The song is a slow whistled pee-pee-pee with many variants, including a faster version, and may be intermingled with the call.

The song of the distinctive S. e. arctica is said to be noticeably different from that of its relatives, which would help to establish whether it is a full species, but there has been insufficient research into its vocalizations.

== Distribution and habitat ==
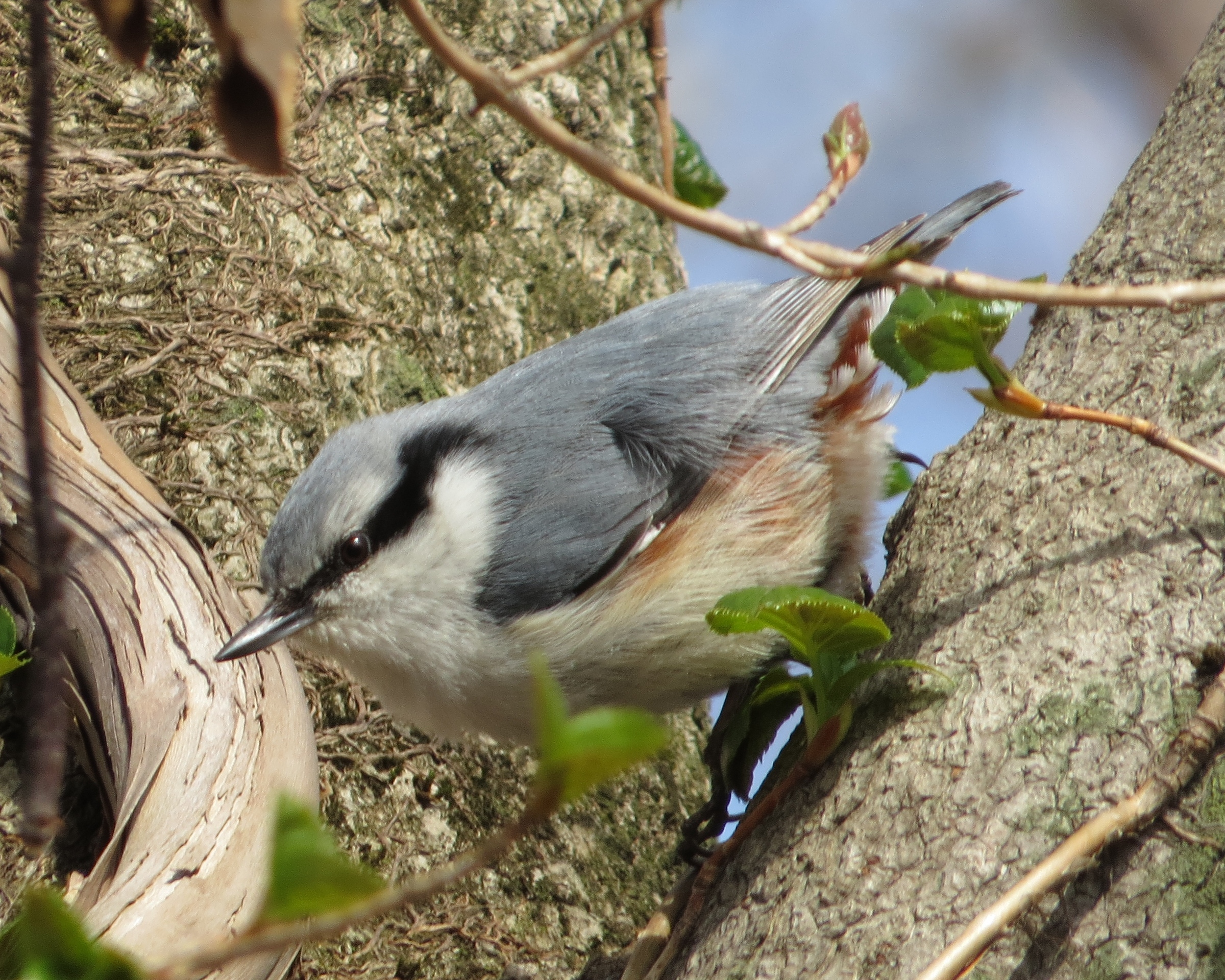
An individual of the subspecies S. e. hondoensis in Yamagata, Gifu, Japan

The Eurasian nuthatch's breeding range extends across temperate Eurasia from Great Britain (but not Ireland) to Japan. It is found between the 16–20 °C (61–68 °F) July isotherms, north to about latitude 64°N in western Russia and 69°N in Siberia. It breeds south to the Mediterranean in Europe, although it is absent from the islands, other than Sicily, and in most of Russia the southern boundary is around 54–55°N. In the east, the range includes most of China and Taiwan and much of Korea. It has occurred as a vagrant in Lebanon and the Channel Islands, and the nominate race has been recorded a few times in Finland where S. e. asiatica is the normal form.

Most populations are sedentary, apart from some post-breeding dispersal of young birds, and there is a reluctance to cross even short stretches of open water. Northern and eastern breeders are dependent on the cones of the Siberian stone pine, and if the crop fails many birds of the S. e. asiatica subspecies may move west into northern Sweden and Finland in autumn, sometimes staying to breed. Siberian S. e. arctica may make more limited movements south and east in winter, and S. e. amurensis, from southeast Russia, is regular in winter in Korea.

The preferred habitat is mature woodland with large, old trees, which provide extensive growth for foraging and nesting holes. In Europe, deciduous or mixed forest is favoured, particularly when containing oak. Parks, old orchards and other wooded habitats may be occupied as long as they have at least a 1 ha (2.5 acres) block of suitable trees. Particularly in mountains, old spruce and pine forests are used, and pine is also favoured in Taiwan. In most of Russia, conifers are used for nesting, but population densities are relatively low. Moroccan birds nest in oak, Atlas cedar and fir. Unusual habitats include dwarf juniper in Mongolia and rocky terrain in a limited part of southern Siberia.

The Eurasian nuthatch is primarily a lowland bird in the north of its range, but reaches the tree-line in Switzerland, at 1,200 m (3,900 ft) or higher, and breeds occasionally at 1,800–2,100 m (5,900–6,900 ft) in Austria. It breeds at similar levels in the mountains of Turkey, the Middle East and Central Asia. It is mainly a mountain bird in southern Japan, 760–2,100 m (2,490–6,890 ft), and Taiwan, 800–3,300 m (2,600–10,800 ft), but in southern China, the chestnut-vented nuthatch is the highland species, with the Eurasian species at lower levels.

== Behaviour ==
=== Breeding ===
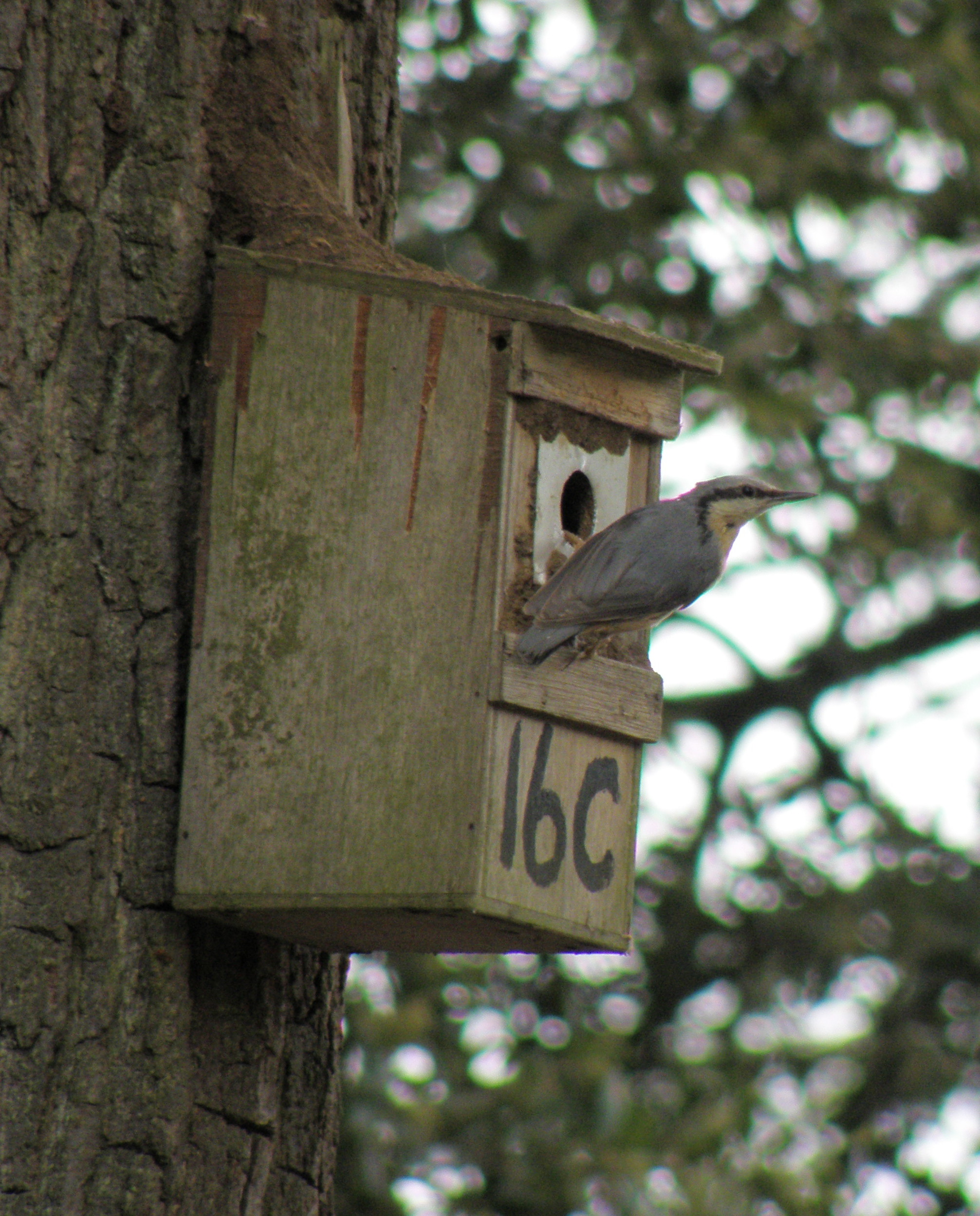
Nuthatches are more reluctant to occupy a nest box than other tree hole nesting birds.

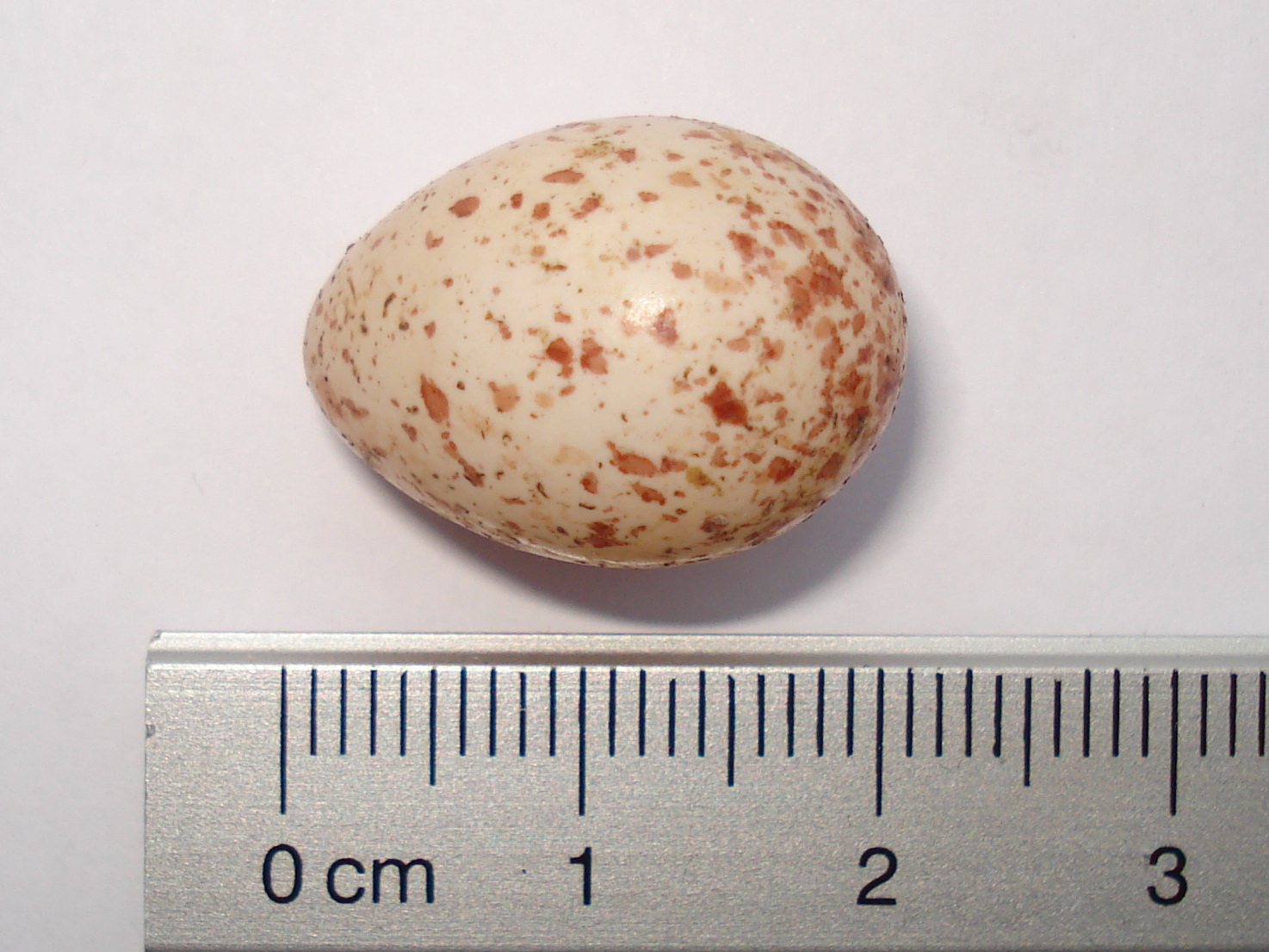
Egg

Nuthatches are monogamous, and a pair occupies a breeding territory in which it spends the winter as well. Territory sizes range from 2–10 ha (5–25 acres) in Europe to an average of 30.2 ha (75 acres) in the sub-optimal conifer forests of Siberia. The male sings to defend his territory and attract a mate. Both sexes have a courtship display with a floating, quivering flight, and the male will also make circular flights with a spread tail and raised head. He will also feed the female while courting her. Despite the lifelong pairing, genetic research in Germany showed that at least 10% of the young in the study area were fathered by another male, usually from an adjacent territory.

The nest is in a tree cavity, usually an old woodpecker hole, but sometimes of natural origin. Occasionally the female will enlarge an existing hole in rotten wood. The nest site is typically 2–20 m (7–66 ft) above the ground and has a deep base of pine bark or chips of other wood, rarely supplemented with dry plant material. If the entrance to the hole is too large, it is plastered with mud, clay and sometimes dung to make it smaller. A small entrance and large interior, together with the use of a deep layer of wood chips in which to bury the eggs and small young when the adults leave the nest, may be adaptations to reduce the chance of predation. Nests with small entrance holes are most successful. Locally, a small entrance may make it less likely that the nest will be taken over by common starlings. The female undertakes most of the work, and often plasters the inside of the cavity too, taking up to four weeks to complete the construction. A nest is often re-used in subsequent years.

The clutch is usually 6–9 red-speckled white eggs, although up to 13 eggs are sometimes laid. They average 19.5 mm × 14.4 mm (0.77 in × 0.57 in) (Note: S. e. caesia) and weigh 2.3 g (0.081 oz) of which 6% is shell. The female incubates the eggs for 13–18 days to hatching, and broods the altricial downy chicks until they fledge 20–26 days later. Both adults feed the chicks in the nest and continue after they fledge until they become independent in about 8–14 days. Normally only one brood is raised each year. When nest boxes are used, the clutch size and number of fledglings are greater in larger boxes. For reasons that are unclear, there is no link between cavity size and nesting outcomes for natural holes.

The sedentary nature of this species means that juveniles can only acquire a territory by finding a vacant area or replacing a dead adult. In Europe, young birds almost always move to unoccupied habitat, but in the larger territories of Siberia most live within the breeding range of an adult pair.

The adult annual survival rate across most of the range is around 51%, and a small Belgian study found a 25% local survival rate for juveniles. The typical lifespan is two years and the maximum known age for a wild bird is 12 years 11 months in the UK. There is also a Swiss longevity record of 10 years 6 months.

=== Feeding ===
Feeding at a bird table in winter (view high resolution version)

The Eurasian nuthatch eats mainly insects, particularly caterpillar and beetles. In autumn and winter, the diet is supplemented with nuts and seeds, hazel nuts and beech mast being preferred. The young are fed mainly on the insects favoured by their parents, with some seeds. Food items are found mainly on tree trunks and large branches, but smaller branches may also be investigated, and food may be taken from the ground, especially outside the breeding season. Nuthatches can forage when descending trees head first, as well as when climbing. Some prey is caught in flight, and a nuthatch will remove bark or rotten wood to reach insects, although it cannot chisel into healthy wood like a woodpecker. A pair may temporarily join a mixed-species foraging flock as it passes near their territory. The Eurasian nuthatch readily visits bird tables and bird feeders in winter, eating human-made food items such as fat, cheese, butter and bread. It has even been recorded as taking slaughterhouse offal. Sizeable hard food items like nuts or large insects are wedged into crevices in tree bark and smashed with the strong bill.

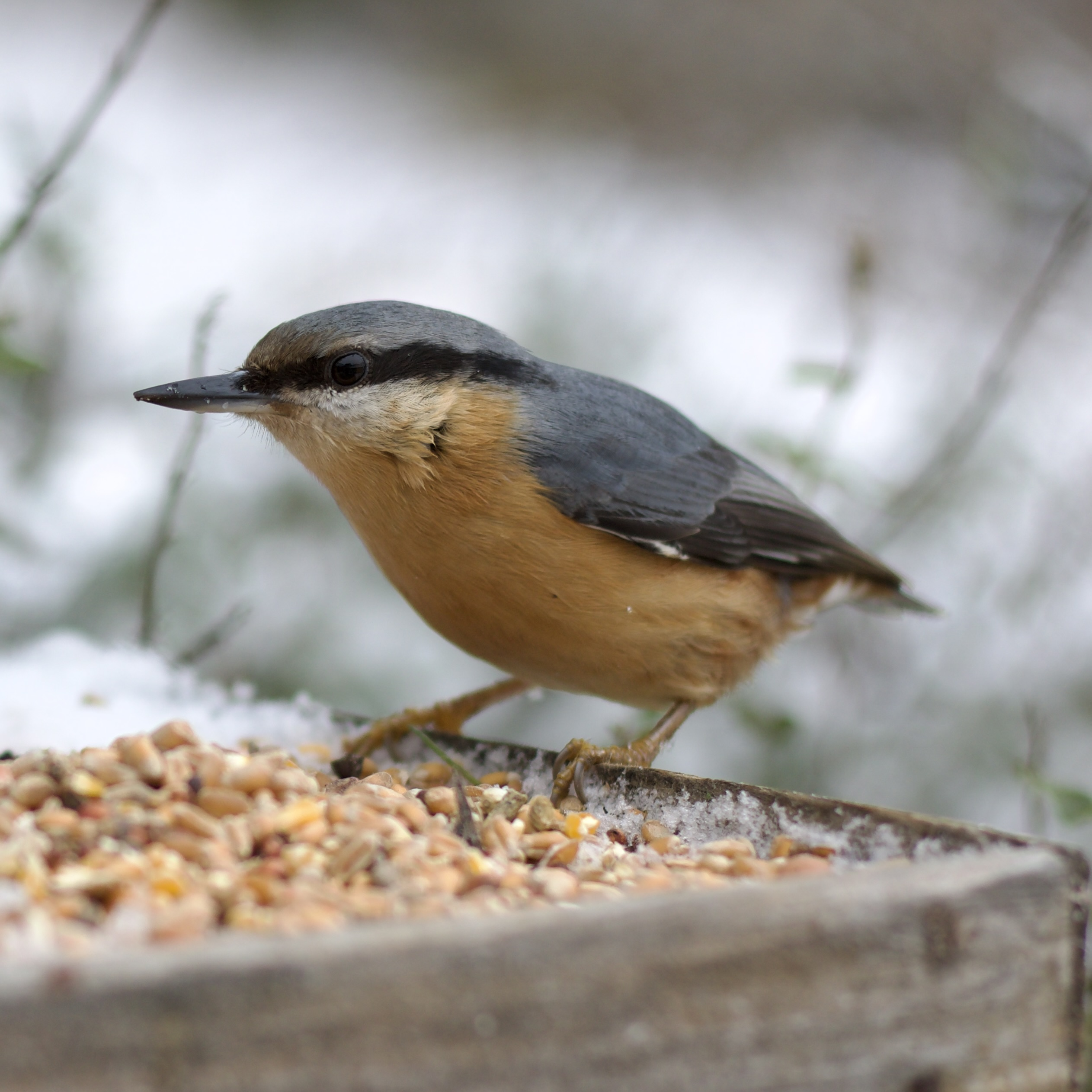
Eurasian nuthatch eating seeds in France (Lot)

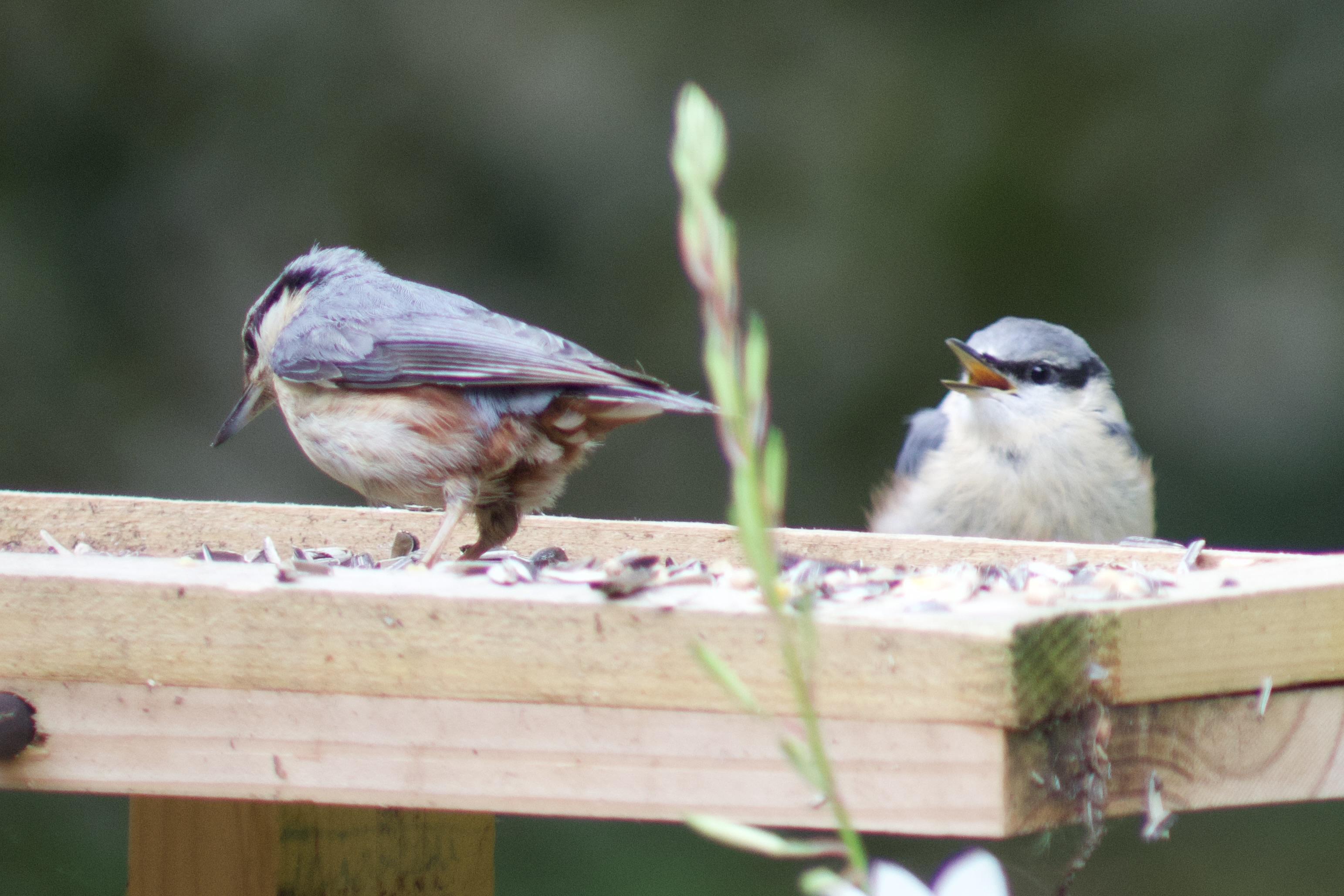
Feeding her chick by shelling sunflower seeds

Plant food is stored year-round, but mainly in autumn. Individual seeds are hidden in cracks in bark, occasionally in walls or in the ground. The food item is usually concealed with lichen, moss or small pieces of bark. The cached food is retrieved in cold weather. Siberian birds store the seeds of the Siberian stone pine, sometimes hoarding enough to last a whole year. Cached food may sometimes include non-plant material such as pieces of bread, caterpillars and grubs, the larvae being incapacitated by battering. Hoarding is a long-term strategy, stored food items only being consumed when fresh food is hard to find, sometimes up to three months after caching. Birds with good stored food supplies are fitter than those with more limited resources. Beech mast crops vary widely from year to year. Where beech mast is an important part of the diet, adult survival rates are largely unaffected in years with a poor mast crop, but the number of juvenile birds falls in the autumn as they are lost through starvation or emigration. In areas where common hazel is the prevalent tree species, there is a similar pattern of adult survival and loss of juvenile birds in years with poor nut production.

=== Predators and parasites ===
Across most of its European range, the most important predator of the Eurasian nuthatch is the sparrowhawk. Other species known to prey on this nuthatch include the northern goshawk, hobby, tawny owl, pygmy owl and least weasel. A Swedish study showed that 6.2% of the nuthatch nests in their study area were raided by predators. The perpetrators were not identified, but the main single predator of tit nests in the same study was the great spotted woodpecker.

Common starlings will take over Eurasian nuthatch nest holes, reducing their breeding success. This is most likely to occur if the nest is high in a tree and there is a good local breeding density of the nuthatch. Introduced ring-necked parakeets may also compete with Eurasian nuthatches for nesting holes. The parakeets tend to occur in fragmented urban woodlands, while nuthatches prefer large old oak woodlands, which reduces the level of competition. Ornithologists conducting a 2010 Belgian study suggested that the problem was not so severe as to warrant culling of the parakeets.

Mites of the genus Ptilonyssus, such as P. sittae, have been found in the Eurasian nuthatch's nasal cavities. Intestinal worms include the nematodes Tridentocapillaria parusi and Pterothominx longifilla. Small studies in Slovakia and Spain found no blood parasites, but a larger Spanish survey found some evidence of Plasmodium infection.

== Status ==
The European population of the Eurasian nuthatch has been estimated as 22.5–57 million birds, suggesting a global total of 45.9–228 million individuals. China, Taiwan, Korea, Japan and Russia each have between 10,000 and 100,000 breeding pairs. The known breeding area is about 23.3 million km^{2} (9 million sq mi), which is a large proportion of the potential suitable habitat, and the population appears to be stable. The large numbers and huge breeding range mean that this species is classified by the International Union for Conservation of Nature as being of least concern.

The Eurasian nuthatch is common throughout much of its range, although densities are lower in the far north and in coniferous forests. Annual numbers in Siberia fluctuate depending on the availability of pine cones from year to year. In recent decades, the nuthatch has colonised Scotland and the Netherlands, and expanded its range in Wales, northern England, Norway and the High Atlas mountain range in North Africa. S. e. asiatica breeds intermittently in Finland and northern Sweden following irruptions. Because large trees are essential, felling or fragmentation of old woodland can lead to local declines or losses.

== Cited texts ==
- Atkinson, Carter T.; Thomas, Nancy J.; Hunter, D. Bruce (2008). Parasitic Diseases of Wild Birds. London: Wiley-Blackwell. ISBN 978-0-8138-2081-1.
- Enoksson, Bodil (1993). "Nuthatch". In Gibbons, David Wingham; Reid, James B.; Chapman, Robert A. (eds.). The New Atlas of Breeding Birds in Britain and Ireland: 1988–1991. London: T & A D Poyser. ISBN 0-85661-075-5.
- Harrap, Simon; Quinn, David (1996). Tits, Nuthatches and Treecreepers. London: Christopher Helm. ISBN 0-7136-3964-4.
- Jedrzejewska, Bogumila; Jedrzejewski, Wlodzimierz (1998). Predation in Vertebrate Communities: The Bialowieza Primeval Forest as a Case Study. Berlin: Springer. ISBN 978-3-540-64138-4.
- Jobling, James A. (2010). The Helm Dictionary of Scientific Bird Names. London: Christopher Helm. ISBN 978-1-4081-2501-4.
- Linnaeus, Carl (1758). Systema naturae per regna tria naturae, secundum classes, ordines, genera, species, cum characteribus, differentiis, synonymis, locis. Tomus I. Editio decima, reformata (in Latin). Holmiae [Stockholm]: Laurentii Salvii.
- Matthysen, Erik; Quinn, David (1998). The Nuthatches. London: Poyser. ISBN 978-0-85661-101-8.
- Mullarney, Killian; Svensson, Lars; Zetterstrom, Dan; Grant, Peter (1999). Collins Bird Guide. London: Collins. ISBN 0-00-219728-6.
- Snow, David; Perrins, Christopher M., eds. (1998). The Birds of the Western Palearctic (concise (two-volume) ed.). Oxford: Oxford University Press. ISBN 978-0-19-854099-1.
