= Karl Michahelles =

German zoologist and physician (1807–1834)

Georg Christian Karl Wilhelm Michahelles (5 May 1807, Nuremberg – 15 August 1834, Nauplia) was a German zoologist and physician originally from Bavaria.

From 1827, he studied medicine at the Ludwig-Maximilians-Universität München, where he made the acquaintance of naturalist Lorenz Oken. In 1831, he received his doctorate of medicine and surgery with the thesis Das Malo Di Scarlievo in Historischer Und Pathologischer Hinsicht.

Michahelles travelled extensively in Dalmatia, Illyria and Croatia, becoming well known for his study of the birds of the area. He died after being affected with dysentery in Greece, aged only 27, where he went to practice medicine and study the wildlife.

He identified, amongst other Mediterranean species, the western rock nuthatch, ladder snake and the Iberian ribbed newt. The yellow-legged gull (Larus michahellis) was named after him by Johann Friedrich Naumann.

== Publications ==
- Ueber einige dalmatinische Vertebraten. in: Isis, 1830. p. 809—820.
- Neue südeuropäische Amphibien. In: Isis von Oken, XXIII, Leipzig 1830, S. 189–195, S. 806–809.
