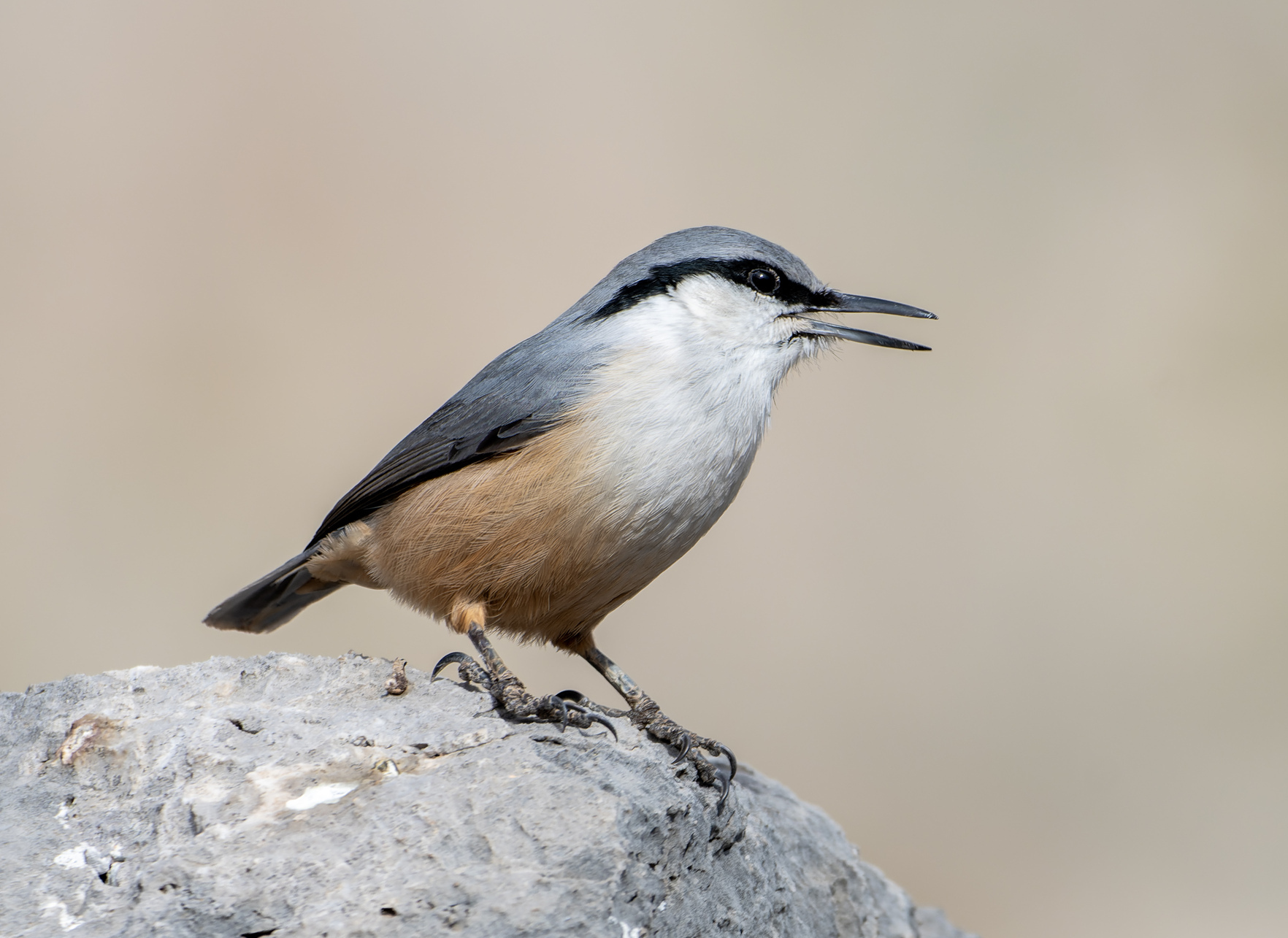
- Denizli, Turkey

Conservation status
- Least Concern (IUCN 3.1)

Scientific classification
- Kingdom: Animalia
- Phylum: Chordata
- Class: Aves
- Order: Passeriformes
- Family: Sittidae
- Genus: Sitta
- Species: S. neumayer

Binomial name
- Sitta neumayer Michahelles, 1830

= Western rock nuthatch =

Species of bird

The western rock nuthatch (Sitta neumayer) is a small passerine bird which breeds from Croatia east through Greece and Turkey to Iran. This nuthatch is largely resident apart from some post-breeding dispersal. The eastern rock nuthatch Sitta tephronota is a separate species, which occurs further east in south-central Asia.

The western rock nuthatch is a bird associated with habitats with bare rocks, especially in mountainous areas. Those at the highest altitudes may move lower down in winter.

It feeds on insects and spiders in summer, supplemented with seeds and snails in winter. It feeds on the ground, and will wedge larger items in rock crevices while it hammers them open with its strong bill. It will also flycatch.

The western rock nuthatch is 13.5 cm long, slightly smaller than Eurasian nuthatch, and has the typical big nuthatch head, short tail and powerful bill and feet. It is long-legged and long-billed compared to most of its relatives.

== Taxonomy ==
Three subspecies are accepted:

- Sitta neumayer neumayer Michahelles, 1830. Southeast Europe, Turkey, Syria, Lebanon, the Caucasus, northern Iraq, and northwestern Iran. The largest subspecies, 23–35.5 g. Dark grey above, with a long, well-marked black eyestripe, a white throat, and underparts shading to buff on the belly. Sexes are similar, and young birds are slightly duller versions of the adults. Synonyms S. n. syriaca Temminck, 1835 and S. n. rupicola Blanford, 1873.
- Sitta neumayer tschitscherini Zarudny, 1904. Zagros Mountains of Iran. Small, 20–22 g. Paler grey above and has a much weaker eyestripe.
- Sitta neumayer plumbea Koelz, 1950. Southern Iran. Resembles S. n. tschitscherini, but has greyer underparts.

It is closely related to eastern rock nuthatch S. tephronota and overlaps with it in the east of its range. Populations in the west of the range (S. n. neumayer) are very similar to eastern rock nuthatches in the east of its range, but where they overlap, they have both evolved by character displacement to become distinct; western rock nuthatches there have become smaller, and with a weaker eyestripe, while eastern rock nuthatches in the overlap zone have become larger, and with a broader, more conspicuous eyestripe.

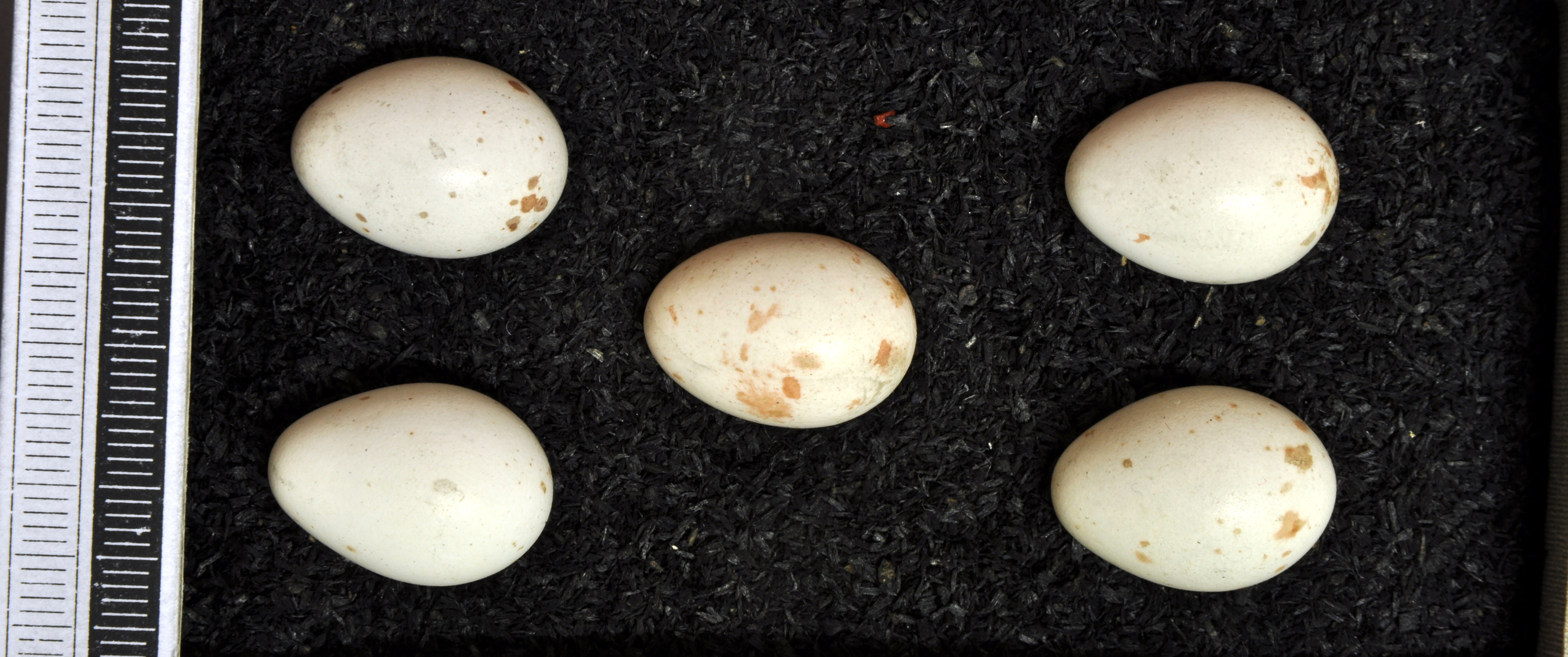
Eggs, Collection Museum Wiesbaden

== Behaviour ==
This territorial species builds a flask-shaped nest from mud, dung and hair or feathers in a rock crevice, cave, or under an overhang on a rock face. Decorative items may be pushed into crevices and cracks near the entrance to the nest. The nest is lined with softer materials and the entrance is sealed with mud. 4-10 eggs are laid, and are white speckled with yellow.

The western rock nuthatch has a tsik call and a trilled tui tui tui song. It is common in suitable habitat in most of its range.

Pliny the Elder believed that it was these birds that inspired man to build homes of earth in imitation of the western rock nuthatch's nests.
