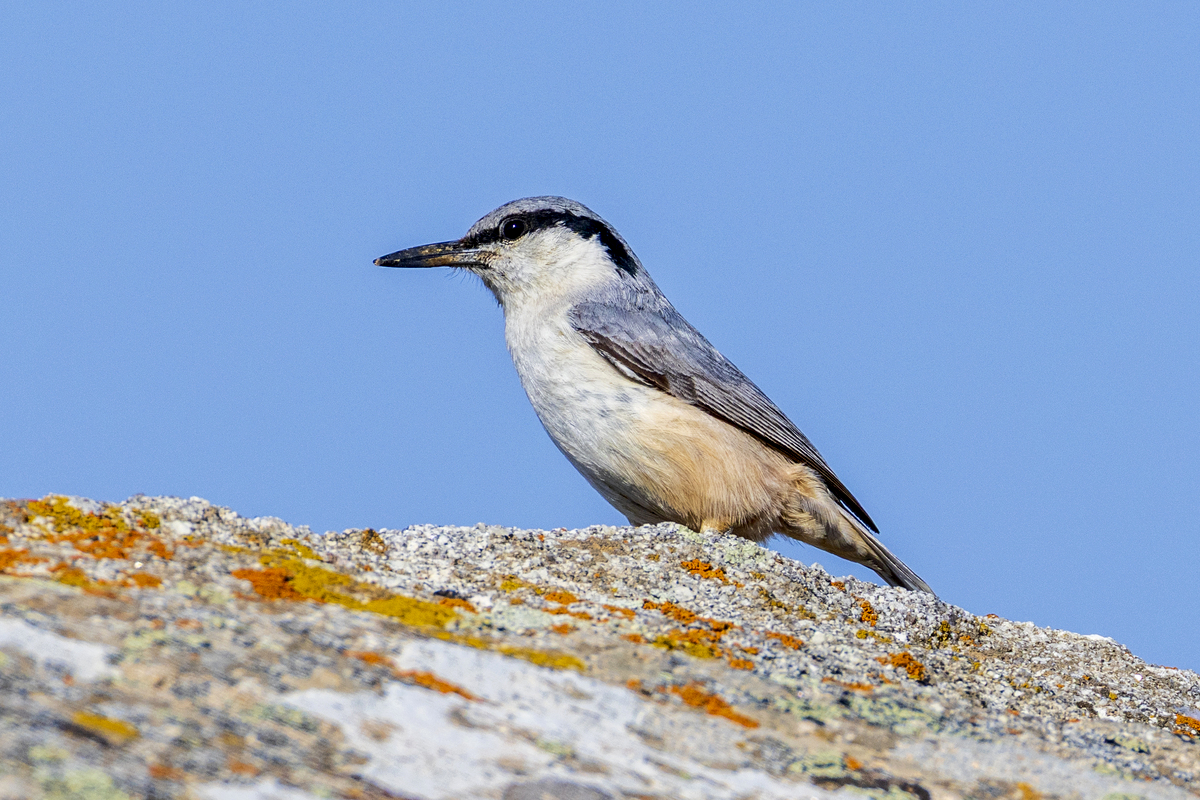
- Sitta tephronota tephronota, Kishlyk, Uzbekistan

Conservation status
- Least Concern (IUCN 3.1)

Scientific classification
- Kingdom: Animalia
- Phylum: Chordata
- Class: Aves
- Order: Passeriformes
- Family: Sittidae
- Genus: Sitta
- Species: S. tephronota

Binomial name
- Sitta tephronota Sharpe, 1872

= Eastern rock nuthatch =

Species of bird

The eastern rock nuthatch (Sitta tephronota) is a species of bird in the nuthatch family Sittidae. It is found in southwest and central Asia, from eastern Turkey east through Armenia, Georgia, Azerbaijan, Iraq, Iran, Kazakhstan, Tajikistan, and Turkmenistan, and Afghanistan, to northwestern Pakistan. Some authors have used the name Persian nuthatch for the species.

== Taxonomy ==
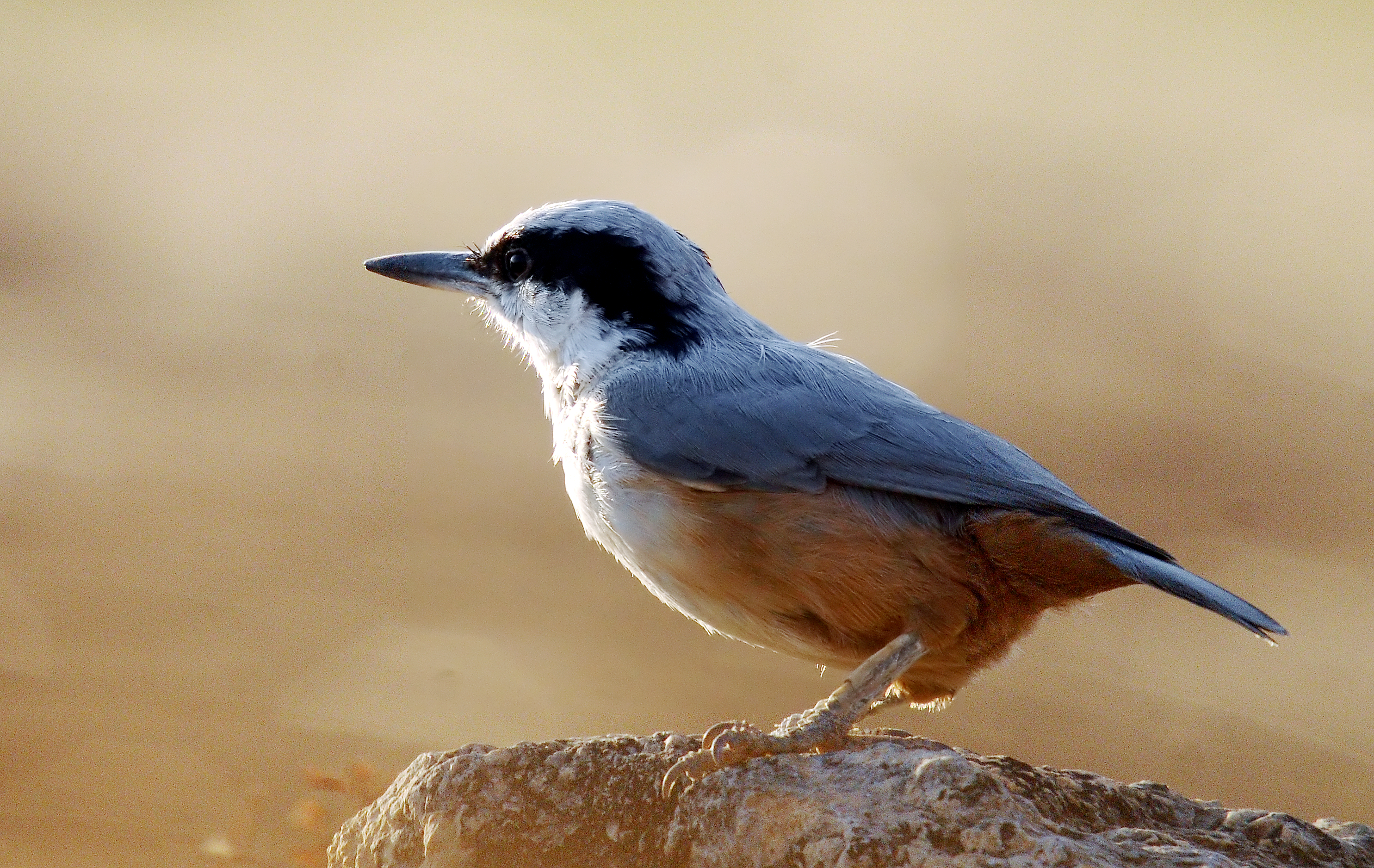
S. t. dresseri, Savur, southeastern Turkey

It is closely related to western rock nuthatch S. neumayer and overlaps with it in the western half of its range. Populations in the west of the range of S. neumayer are very similar to eastern rock nuthatches in the east of its range, but where they overlap, they have both evolved by character displacement to become distinct; western rock nuthatches there have become smaller, and with a weaker eyestripe, while eastern rock nuthatches in the overlap zone have become larger, and with a broader, more conspicuous eyestripe.

Four subspecies are accepted:

- Sitta tephronota obscura Zarudny & Loudon, 1905. Northeastern Turkey, Caucasus, northwestern Iran.
- Sitta tephronota dresseri Zarudny & Buturlin, 1906. Southeastern Turkey and northern Iraq to western and southwestern Iran.
- Sitta tephronota tephronota Sharpe, 1872. Northeastern Iran to central Asia.
- Sitta tephronota iranica (Buturlin, 1916). Mountains in the Kyzylkum desert.

== Description ==
Eastern rock nuthatch is 15–16 cm long. It is one of the least brightly coloured nuthatches, with pale blue-grey upperparts, a white breast, and the belly grading from white to pale orange-buff on the under-tail coverts. The head has a bold black eyestripe. The subspecies range in size from smaller in the east, to largest in the west; S. t. iranica and S. t. tephronota are the smallest, at 30–39 g, while S. t. dresseri at 42.7–55 g is the largest. This last subspecies, while not as long-bodied as the giant nuthatch, is the heaviest in the entire family.

== Behaviour ==
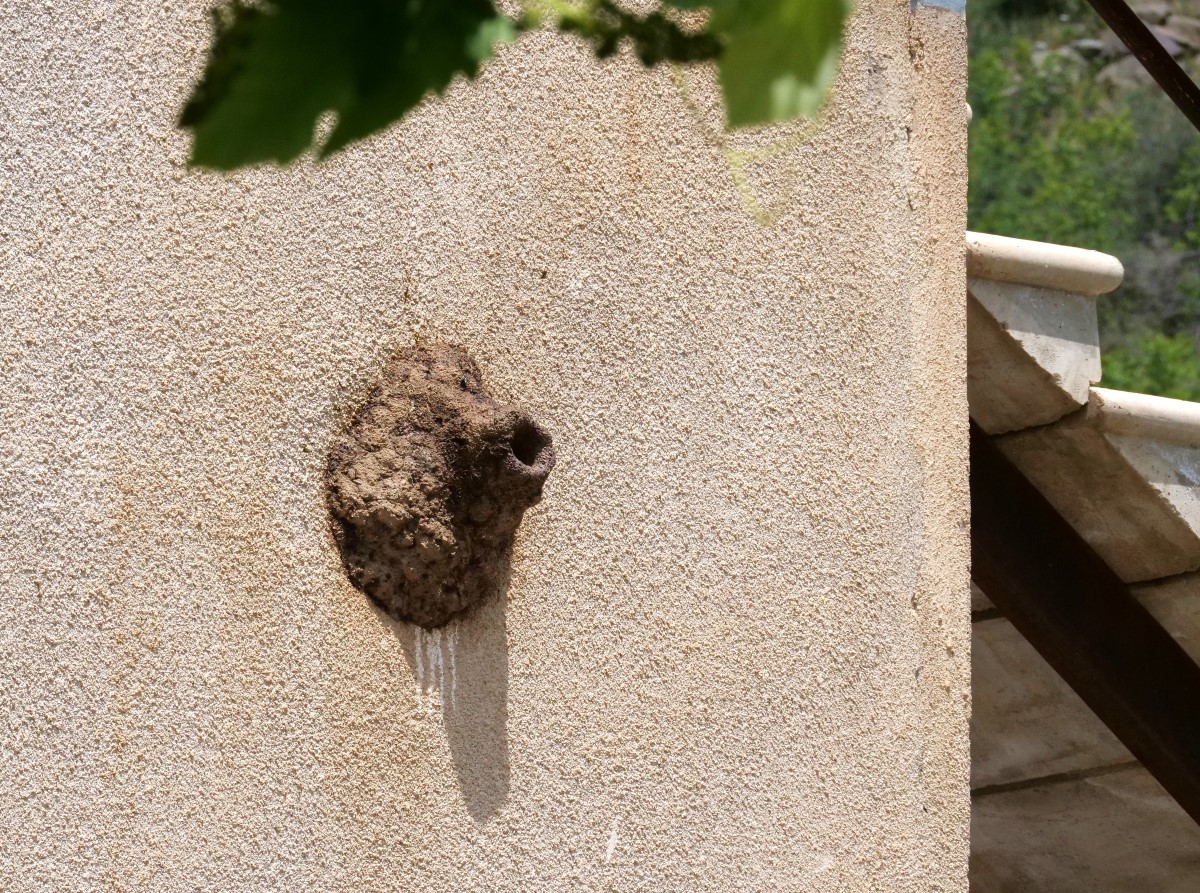
Nest on the side of a house in Armenia

Like the western rock nuthatch, it builds a flask-shaped nest from mud, dung and hair or feathers in a rock crevice, cave, or under an overhang on a rock face.
