= Bismarck whistler =

Scientific classification
- Kingdom: Animalia
- Phylum: Chordata
- Class: Aves
- Order: Passeriformes
- Family: Pachycephalidae
- Genus: Pachycephala
- Species: P. citreogaster

Binomial name
- Pachycephala citreogaster Ramsay, 1876

Subspecies
- See text

Species of bird

The Bismarck whistler (Pachycephala citreogaster) is a species of bird in the family Pachycephalidae, which is endemic to the Bismarck Archipelago north-east of New Guinea.

== Taxonomy and systematics ==
Prior to 2015, the western whistler was considered as a subspecies of the Australian golden whistler until recognized as a separate species. Some other authorities still consider it to be a subspecies of a wide-ranging golden whistler, but strong published evidence in favour of either treatment is limited, and further study is warranted to resolve the complex taxonomic situation.

=== Subspecies ===
Five subspecies are recognized:

- P. c. citreogaster – Ramsay, 1876: Found on New Hanover, New Britain and New Ireland (Bismarck Archipelago)
- P. c. sexuvaria – Rothschild & Hartert, 1924: Found on St. Matthias Islands (northern Bismarck Archipelago)
- P. c. goodsoni – Rothschild & Hartert, 1914: Found on Admiralty Islands (north of New Guinea)
- P. c. tabarensis – Mayr, 1955: Found on Tabar Island (eastern Bismarck Archipelago)
- P. c. ottomeyeri – Stresemann, 1933: Found on Lihir Island (eastern Bismarck Archipelago)

== Description ==
The males of the Bismarck whistler are white-throated unlike the yellow-throated males of the oriole whistler (P. orioloides) to the south-east.
