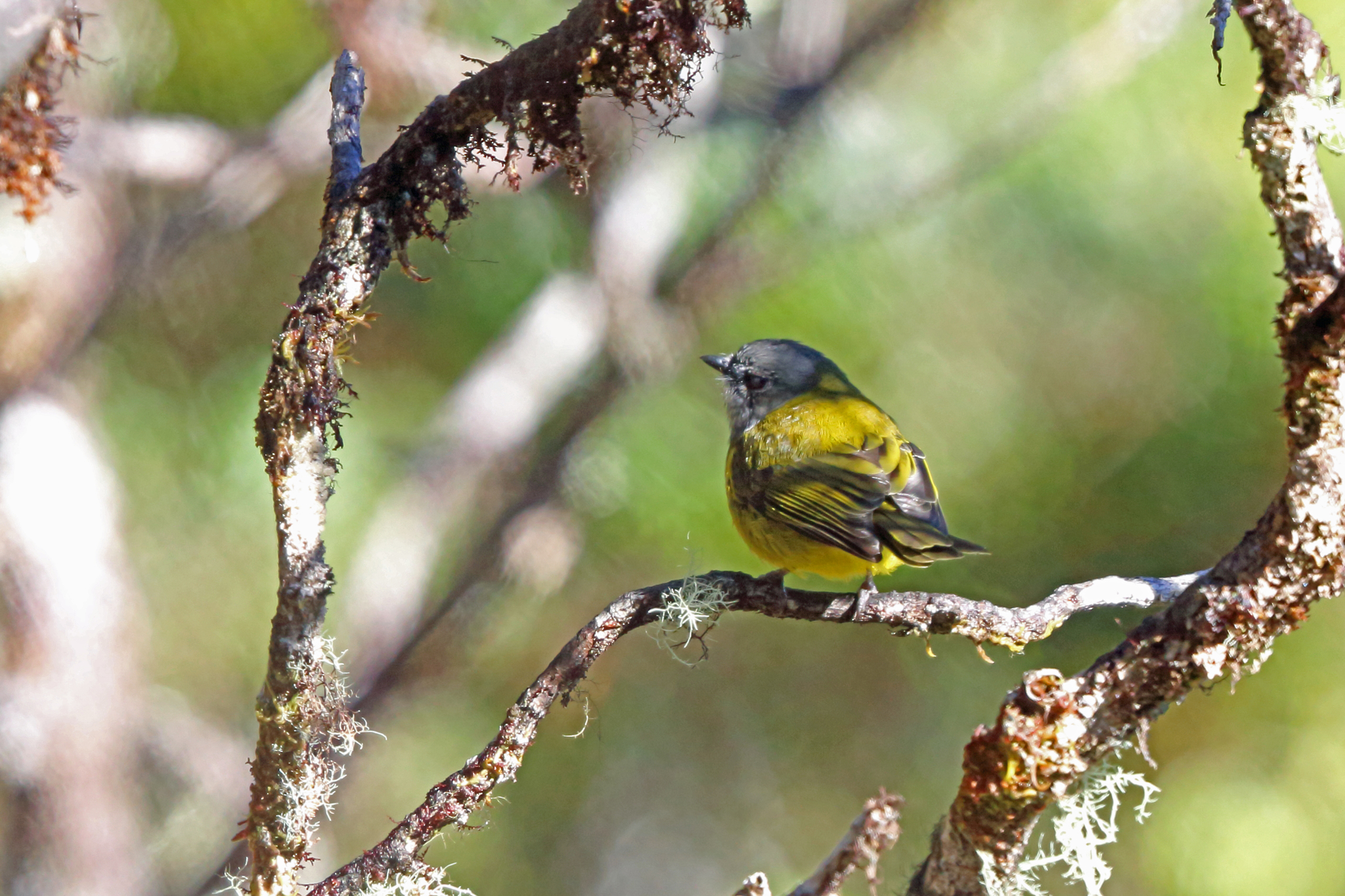

Conservation status
- Least Concern (IUCN 3.1)

Scientific classification
- Kingdom: Animalia
- Phylum: Chordata
- Class: Aves
- Order: Passeriformes
- Family: Pachycephalidae
- Genus: Pachycephala
- Species: P. lorentzi

Binomial name
- Pachycephala lorentzi Mayr, 1931

Synonyms
- Pachycephala schlegelii lorentzi

= Lorentz's whistler =

Species of bird

Lorentz's whistler (Pachycephala lorentzi) is a species of bird in the family Pachycephalidae. It is found in the mid-western New Guinea Highlands. Its natural habitat is subtropical or tropical moist montane forests. It was originally described as a subspecies of the regent whistler.

It is named after Hendrikus Albertus Lorentz.
