= Utupua whistler =

Conservation status
- Not evaluated (IUCN 3.1)

Scientific classification
- Kingdom: Animalia
- Phylum: Chordata
- Class: Aves
- Order: Passeriformes
- Family: Pachycephalidae
- Genus: Pachycephala
- Species: P. utupuae

Binomial name
- Pachycephala utupuae Mayr, 1932

Species of bird

The Utupua whistler (Pachycephala utupuae) is a passerine bird in the family Pachycephalidae that is endemic to the island of Utupua in the Santa Cruz Islands of the western Pacific Ocean. It was formerly treated as a subspecies of the Vanikoro whistler. Prior to the split the combined species were known by the English name "Temotu whistler".

== Taxonomy ==
The Utupua whistler was formally described in 1932 by the American ornithologist Ernst Mayr based on specimens collected during the Whitney South Sea Expedition to the small island of Utupua in the Santa Cruz Islands. These islands form part of the Solomon Islands in the Pacific Ocean. Mayr considered his specimens to be a subspecies of what is now the Australian golden whistler and coined the trinomial name Pachycephala pectoralis utupuae. The Utupua whistler was previously considered to be a subspecies of the Vanikoro whistler (Pachycephala vanikorensis) but is now classified as a separate species based the striking differences in female plumage. The species is monotypic: no subspecies are recognised.
