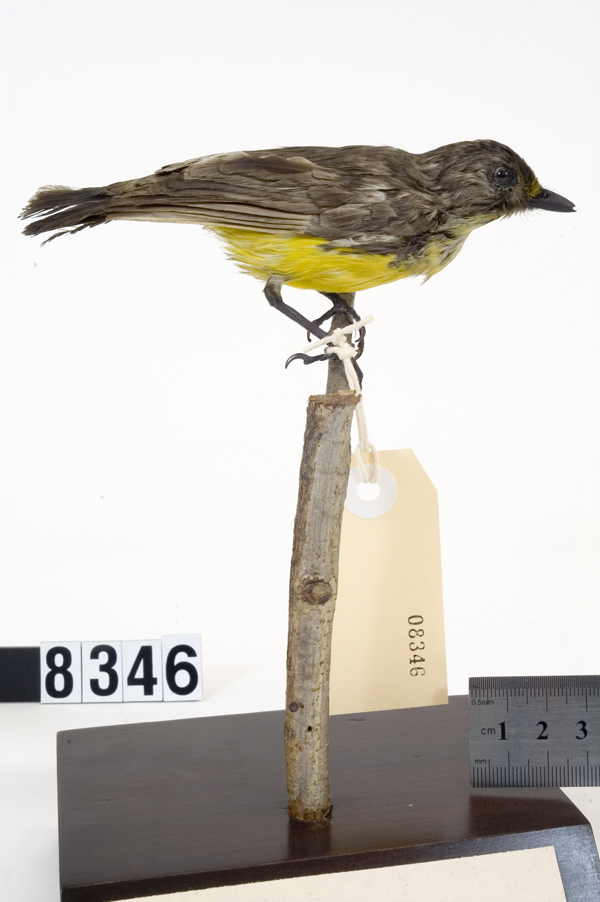

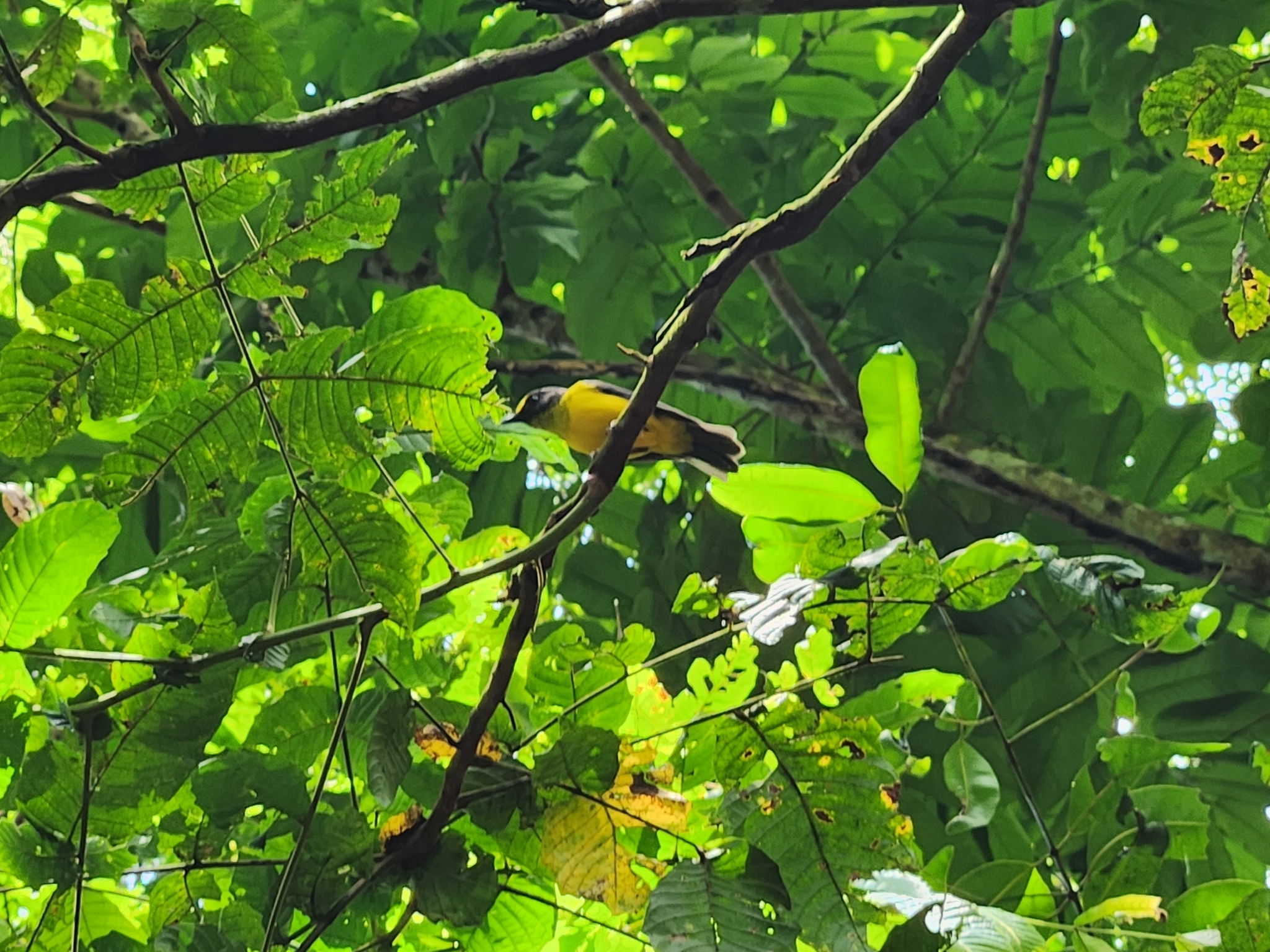

Conservation status
- Least Concern (IUCN 3.1)

Scientific classification
- Kingdom: Animalia
- Phylum: Chordata
- Class: Aves
- Order: Passeriformes
- Family: Pachycephalidae
- Genus: Pachycephala
- Species: P. flavifrons

Binomial name
- Pachycephala flavifrons (Peale, 1849)

Synonyms
- Eopsaltria flavifrons; Pachycephala pectoralis flavifrons

= Samoan whistler =

Species of bird

The Samoan whistler (Pachycephala flavifrons), (Vasavasa) also known as the yellow-fronted whistler, is a species of bird in the family Pachycephalidae. It is endemic to Samoa, where it is found in forest, plantations and gardens on Upolu, Savaiʻi, and Nuʻutele.

== Taxonomy ==
The Samoan whistler was formally described in 1848 or 1849 by American naturalist Titian Peale in volume VIII of the report of the United States Exploring Expedition. He placed it with the Australian yellow robins in the genus Eopsaltria and coined the binomial name Eopsaltria flavifrons. He based his description on samples and observations taken during the expedition, and considered it similar to the American Yellow-breasted chat, but for the shape of its bill. It is now one of 51 species classified as part of the genus Pachycephala.

It has been previously considered a subspecies of the Australian golden whistler, Pachycephala pectoralis, as P. pectoralis flavifrons.

== Description ==
The Samoan whistler is a small bird with a length of 16-18cm and a wingspan of 23-26cm. It has dark olive-green or brown upper parts, a pale throat and bright yellow breast, but there is considerable variation among individuals. The female is a duller version of the male with a pale grey throat.

== Behaviour ==
The Samoan whistler lives in forests and forest-edges, as well as plantations and village gardens from sea-level to 1400m. The bird is insectivorous, foraging in the middle story of forests, but will also eat fruit. It nests in late March, and breeds from May to November. Its calls include short whistles, chweeps, and a longer "tweet-chew-twee-titi-chew-weet".
