= Rennell whistler =

Conservation status
- Near Threatened (IUCN 3.1)

Scientific classification
- Kingdom: Animalia
- Phylum: Chordata
- Class: Aves
- Order: Passeriformes
- Family: Pachycephalidae
- Genus: Pachycephala
- Species: P. feminina

Binomial name
- Pachycephala feminina Mayr, 1931

Synonyms
- Pachycephala orioloides feminina; Pachycephala pectoralis feminina

Species of bird

The Rennell whistler (Pachycephala feminina) is a species of bird in the family Pachycephalidae, which is endemic to the Rennell Island in the Solomon Islands. It was split from the Bismarck whistler by the IOC in 2016.

== Taxonomy and systematics ==
It has been variably considered a subspecies of a widespread golden whistler (P. pectoralis) or treated as a separate species, but strong published evidence in favour of either treatment is limited, and further study is warranted to resolve the complex taxonomic situation.

== Status ==
The Rennell whistler is assessed as Near Threatened by the IUCN due to its small population and habitat loss within a restricted range.
