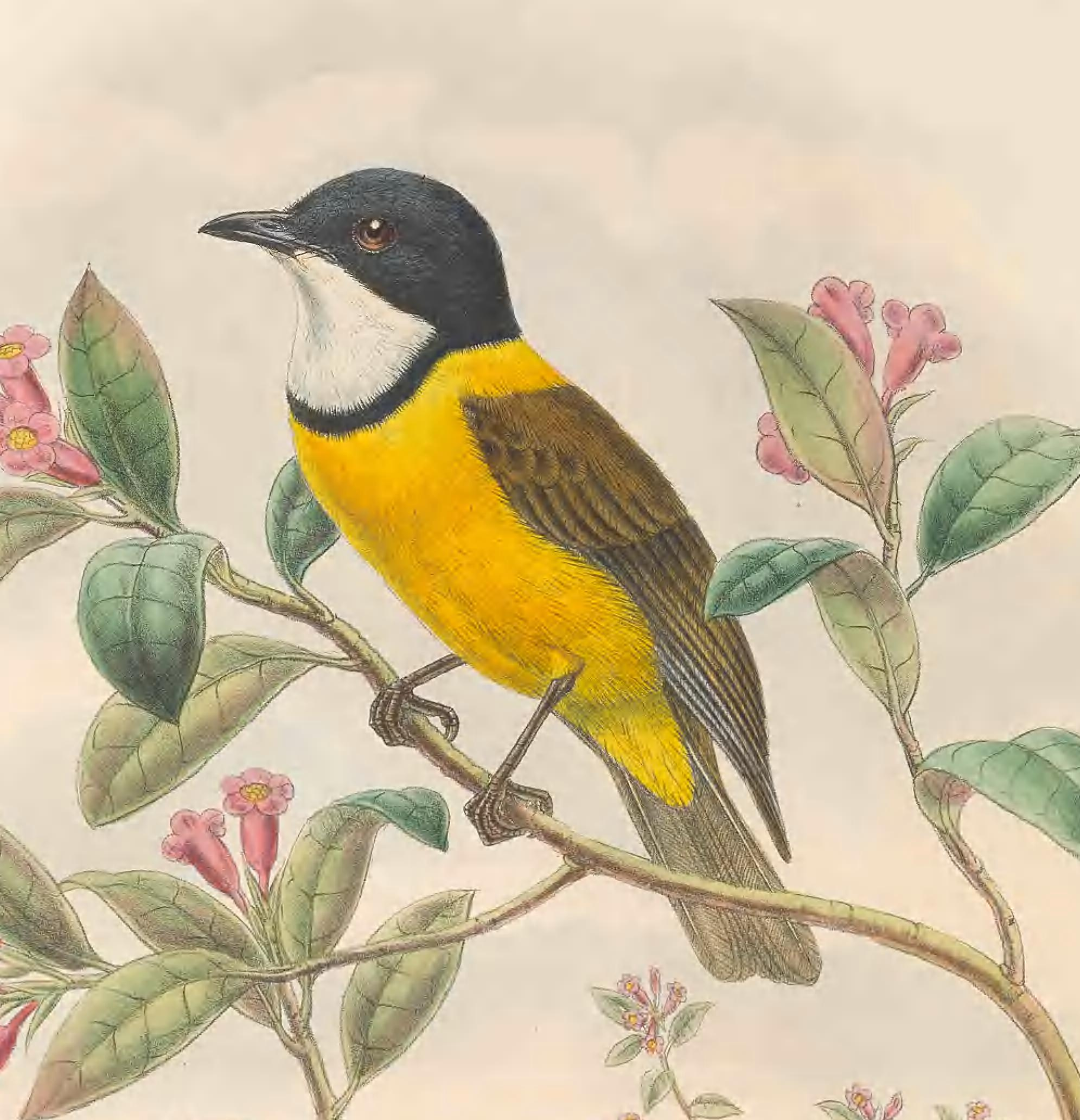
- Male illustration by William Matthew Hart

Scientific classification
- Kingdom: Animalia
- Phylum: Chordata
- Class: Aves
- Order: Passeriformes
- Family: Pachycephalidae
- Genus: Pachycephala
- Species: P. collaris

Binomial name
- Pachycephala collaris Ramsay, 1878

Subspecies
- See text

= Louisiade whistler =

Species of bird

The Louisiade whistler (Pachycephala collaris) is a species of bird in the family Pachycephalidae, which is endemic to the Louisiade Archipelago south-east of New Guinea. It was split from the Bismarck whistler by the IOC in 2015.

== Taxonomy and systematics ==
It has been variably considered a subspecies of a widespread golden whistler (P. pectoralis) or treated as a separate species, but strong published evidence in favour of either treatment is limited, and further study is warranted to resolve the complex taxonomic situation.

=== Subspecies ===
Two subspecies are recognized:

- P. c. collaris - Ramsay, 1878: Found in the Louisiade Archipelago except Rossel Island
- P. c. rosseliana - Hartert, 1898: Originally described as a separate species. Found on Rossel Island (Louisiade Archipelago)
