= Vanikoro whistler =

Conservation status
- Not evaluated (IUCN 3.1)

Scientific classification
- Kingdom: Animalia
- Phylum: Chordata
- Class: Aves
- Order: Passeriformes
- Family: Pachycephalidae
- Genus: Pachycephala
- Species: P. vanikorensis

Binomial name
- Pachycephala vanikorensis Oustalet, 1875

Species of bird

The Vanikoro whistler (Pachycephala vanikorensis) is a passerine bird in the family Pachycephalidae, which is endemic to the southeast Santa Cruz Islands of the Solomon Islands group. The Nendo whistler and Utupua whistler were formerly treated as subspecies. Before the split the combined species were known by the English name "Temotu whistler".

== Taxonomy ==
The Vanikoro whistler was at one time considered to be one of the many subspecies of the widespread golden whistler (Pachycephala pectoralis), now the Australian golden whistler. The species is monotypic: no subspecies are recognised.
