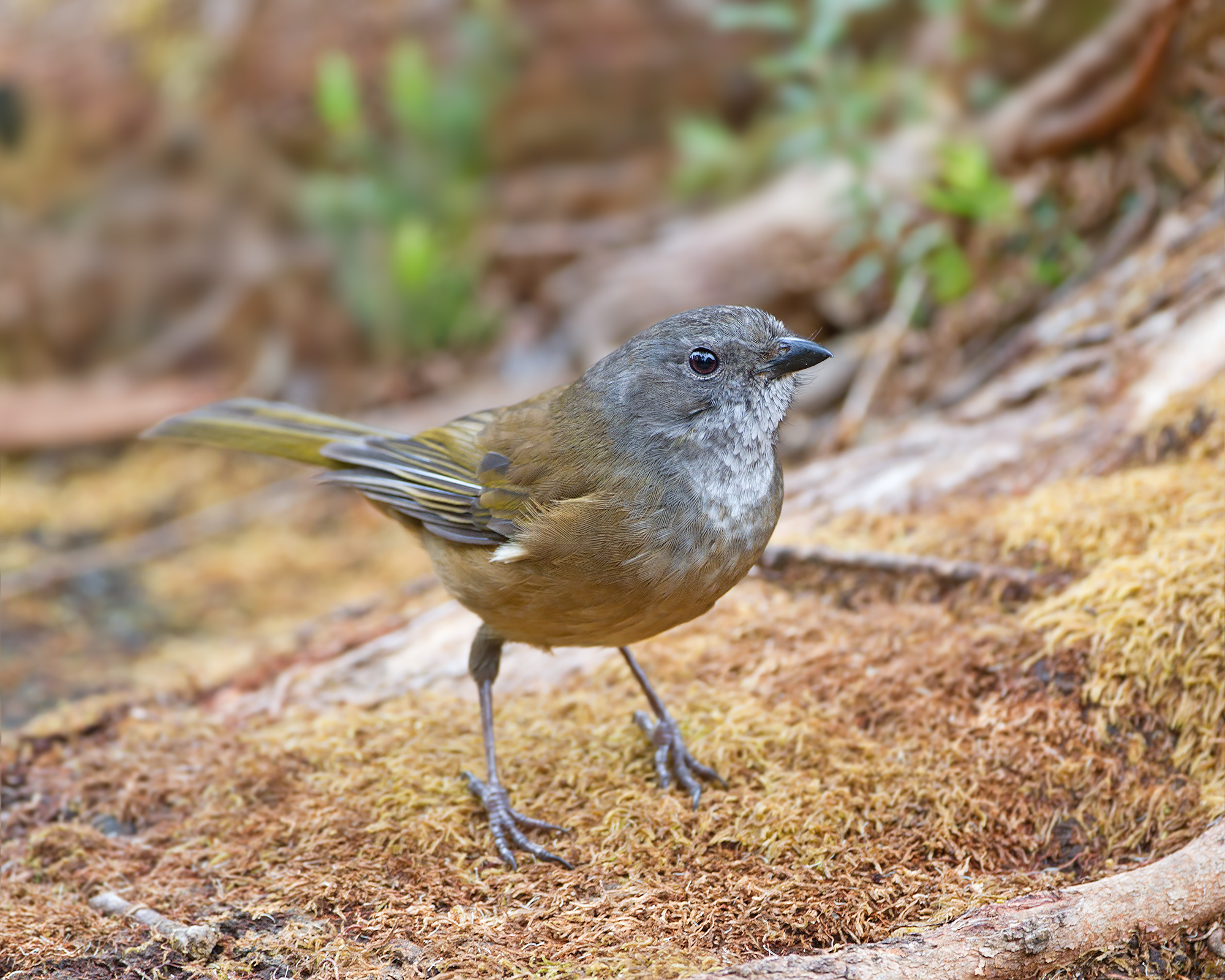
- in South West Tasmania

Conservation status
- Least Concern (IUCN 3.1)

Scientific classification
- Kingdom: Animalia
- Phylum: Chordata
- Class: Aves
- Order: Passeriformes
- Family: Pachycephalidae
- Genus: Pachycephala
- Species: P. olivacea

Binomial name
- Pachycephala olivacea Vigors & Horsfield, 1827

Subspecies
- See text

= Olive whistler =

Species of bird

The olive whistler (Pachycephala olivacea) or olivaceous whistler, is a species of bird in the family Pachycephalidae, the whistlers, that is native to southeastern Australia.

== Taxonomy and systematics ==
=== Subspecies ===
Five subspecies are recognized:

- P. o. macphersoniana – White, HL, 1920: Found in eastern Australia
- P. o. olivacea – Vigors & Horsfield, 1827: Found in southeastern Australia
- P. o. bathychroa – Schodde & Mason, 1999: Found in southeastern Australia
- P. o. apatetes – Schodde & Mason, 1999: Found in Tasmania and islands in the Bass Strait, Australia
- P. o. hesperus – Schodde & Mason, 1999: Found in southern Australia

== Description ==
Adult birds are around 18–20 cm (7–8 in) long, and have an overall olive brown plumage with a streaked white throat. To an untrained eye, they can be mistaken for female golden whistlers. The male has a dark grey head, pale grey breast and red-tinged buff belly and rump. The female lacks the red tinge, and has brown underparts. The legs, bill and eyes of both sexes are a brown-black. The melodious call has been likened to I'll wet you or you're cranky, and is possibly the most musical of all whistlers.

== Distribution and habitat ==
The olive whistler is found from the McPherson Range in far southeast Queensland south through New South Wales and into Victoria and southeastern South Australia, Flinders and King Islands and Tasmania.

The habitat is mainly wet forest, and Antarctic beech (Nothofagus moorei) forest in northern New South Wales.

== Behaviour and ecology ==
=== Breeding ===
Olive whistlers nest from September to December, raising one brood during this period. The nest is a fragile bowl of twigs, grasses and bits of bark lined with softer plant material and bound with spiderwebs in the fork of a tree around 2 m (6.6 ft) above the ground. A clutch of two or three oval eggs is laid; they are 20 x 28 mm and shiny cream with brown, black and lavender spots and blotches (more on larger end).

=== Food and feeding ===
It is predominantly insectivorous.

== Status ==
An uncommon species, it is considered of least concern on the global IUCN Red List, but vulnerable in New South Wales due to habitat fragmentation and feral cats and foxes.
