= Nendo whistler =

- Male
- Female

Conservation status
- Not evaluated (IUCN 3.1)

Scientific classification
- Kingdom: Animalia
- Phylum: Chordata
- Class: Aves
- Order: Passeriformes
- Family: Pachycephalidae
- Genus: Pachycephala
- Species: P. ornata

Binomial name
- Pachycephala ornata Mayr, 1932

Species of bird

The Nendo whistler (Pachycephala ornata) is a passerine bird in the family Pachycephalidae. It is endemic to Nendö, as well as the Reef and Duff islands in the Santa Cruz Islands of the western Pacific Ocean. It was formerly treated as a subspecies of the Vanikoro whistler. Before the split the combined species were known by the English name "Temotu whistler".

== Taxonomy ==
The Nendo whistler was formally described in 1932 by the American ornithologist Ernst Mayr based on specimens collected during the Whitney South Sea Expedition to the island of Nendö in the Santa Cruz Islands. These islands form part of the Solomon Islands in the Pacific Ocean. Mayr considered his specimens to be subspecies of what is now the Australian golden whistler and coined the trinomial name Pachycephala pectoralis ornata. The specific epithet ornata is Latin meaning "ornate", "adorned", "decorated", "splendid" or "embellished". The Nendo whistler was previously considered to be a subspecies of the Vanikoro whistler (Pachycephala vanikorensis) but is now classified as a separate species based on DNA sequence analysis and differences in plumage. The species is monotypic: no subspecies are recognised.
