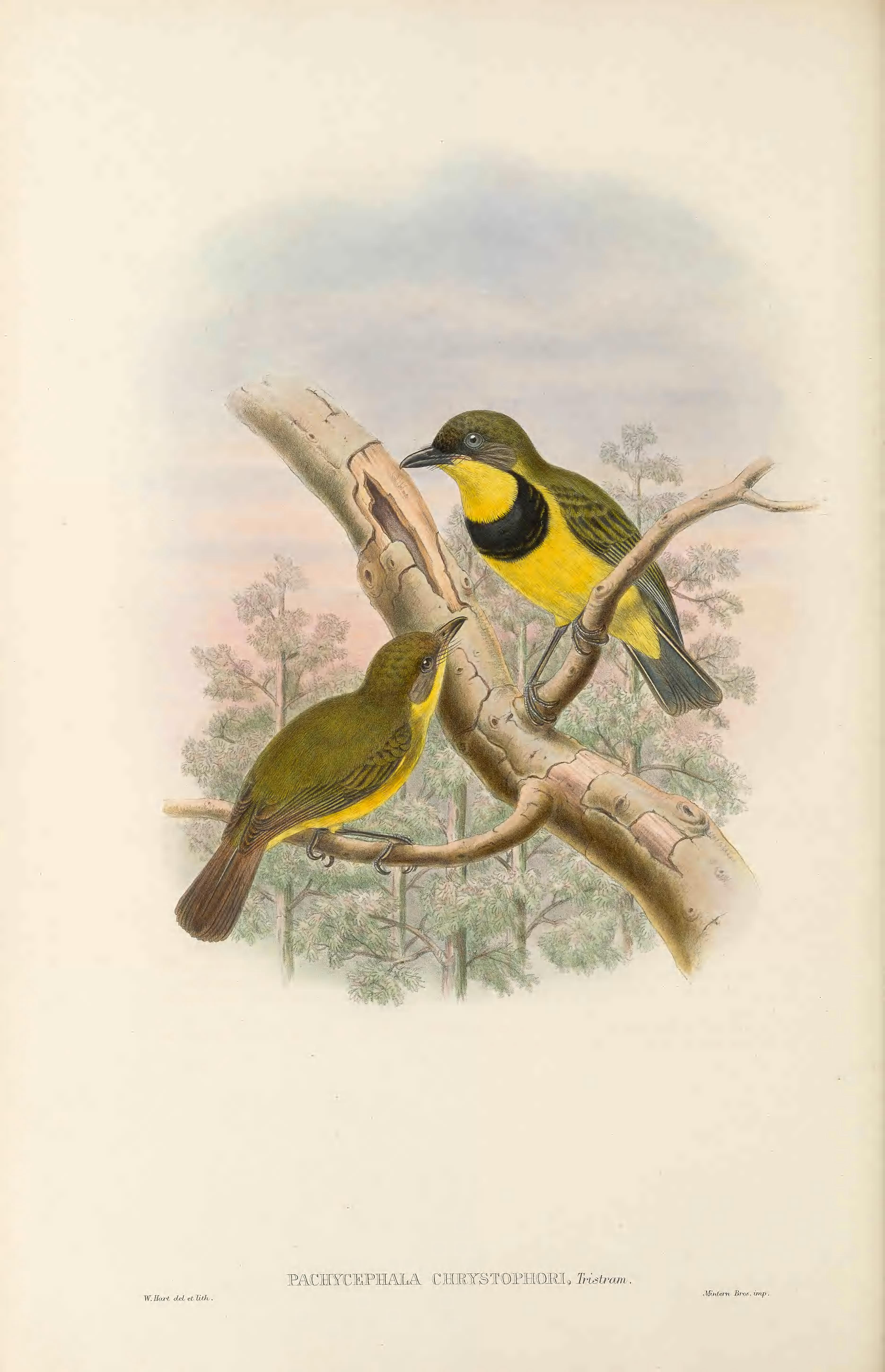

Conservation status
- Least Concern (IUCN 3.1)

Scientific classification
- Kingdom: Animalia
- Phylum: Chordata
- Class: Aves
- Order: Passeriformes
- Family: Pachycephalidae
- Genus: Pachycephala
- Species: P. orioloides

Binomial name
- Pachycephala orioloides Pucheran, 1853

Subspecies
- See text

= Oriole whistler =

Species of bird

The oriole whistler (Pachycephala orioloides), also known as the yellow-throated whistler (leading to easy confusion with Pachycephala macrorhyncha), is a species of bird in the family Pachycephalidae, which is endemic to the Solomon Islands (archipelago).

== Taxonomy and systematics ==
It is variably considered a subspecies of a widespread golden whistler (P. pectoralis) or treated as a separate species, but strong published evidence in favour of either treatment is limited, and further study is warranted to resolve the complex taxonomic situation. Even if not recognized as a separate species, the oriole whistler includes several very different subspecies, though the males are united by their yellow throat.

=== Subspecies ===
Nine subspecies are recognized:

- P. o. bougainvillei - Mayr, 1932: Found on Buka, Bougainville and Shortland Islands
- P. o. orioloides - Pucheran, 1853: Found on Choiseul, Malakobi, Santa Isabel and Florida Islands
- P. o. centralis - Mayr, 1932: Found on eastern New Georgia Islands
- P. o. melanoptera - Mayr, 1932: Found on southern New Georgia Islands
- P. o. melanonota - Hartert, 1908: Originally described as a separate species. Found on Ranongga and Vella Lavella
- P. o. pavuvu - Mayr, 1932: Found on Pavuvu
- P. o. sanfordi - Mayr, 1931: Originally described as a separate species. Found on Malaita
- P. o. cinnamomea - (Ramsay, EP, 1879): Originally described as a separate species in the genus Pseudorectes. Found on Beagle Island and Guadalcanal
- P. o. christophori - Tristram, 1879: Originally described as a separate species. Found on Santa Ana and San Cristóbal Island

== Distribution ==
The oriole whistler is found throughout the Solomons, except in the Santa Cruz Islands.
