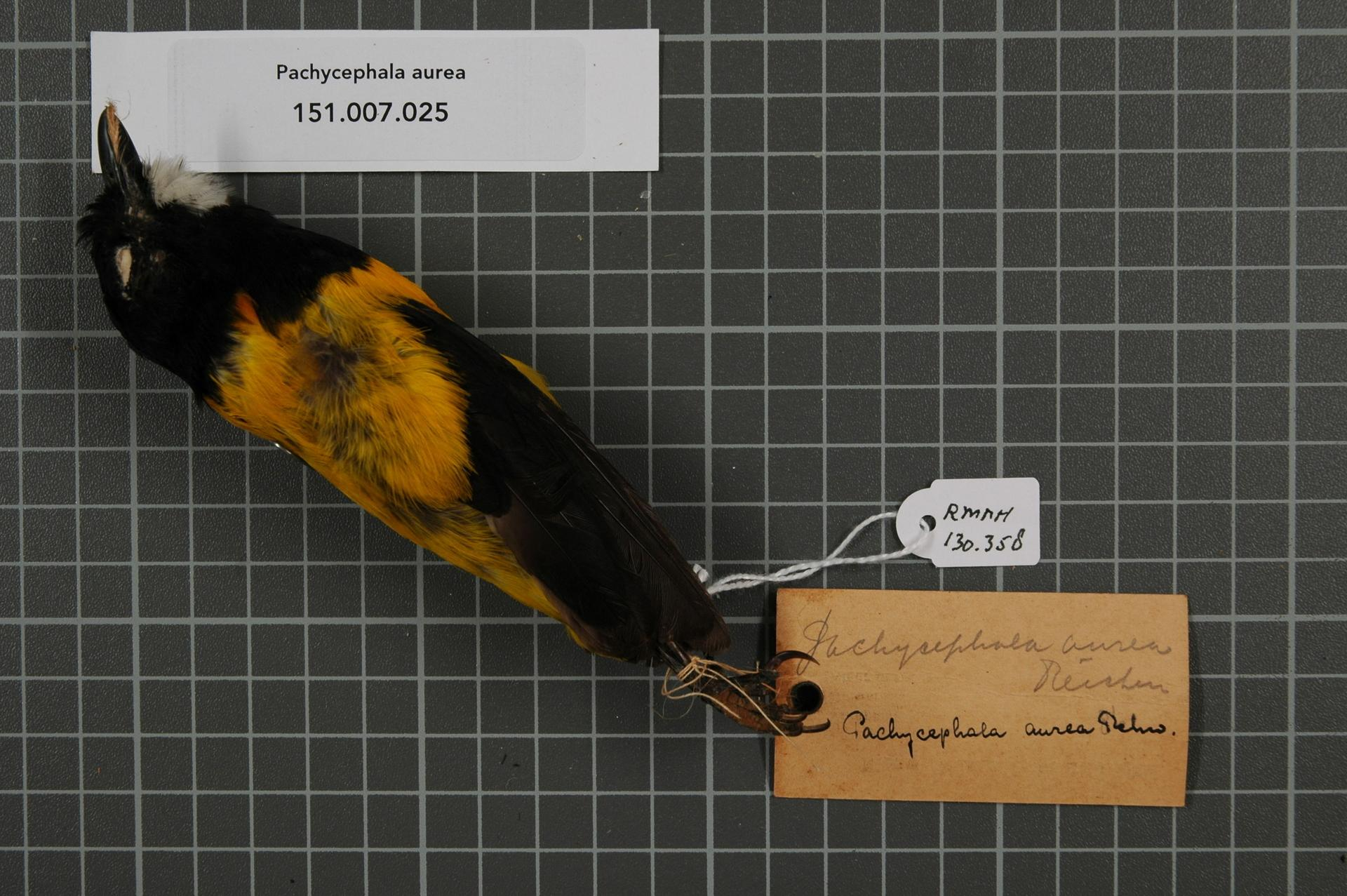

Conservation status
- Least Concern (IUCN 3.1)

Scientific classification
- Kingdom: Animalia
- Phylum: Chordata
- Class: Aves
- Order: Passeriformes
- Family: Pachycephalidae
- Genus: Pachycephala
- Species: P. aurea

Binomial name
- Pachycephala aurea Reichenow, 1899

= Golden-backed whistler =

Species of bird

The golden-backed whistler (Pachycephala aurea) or yellow-backed whistler, is a species of bird in the family Pachycephalidae. It is found throughout New Guinea.
