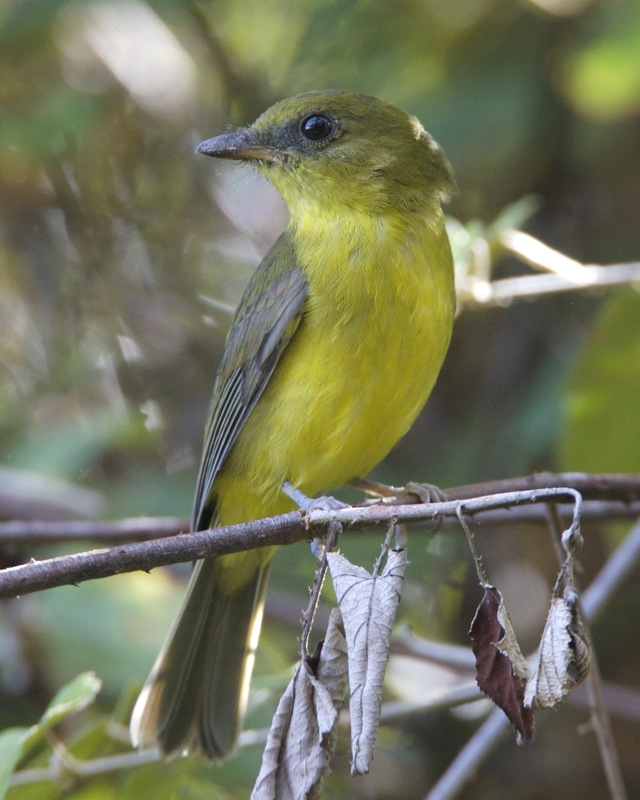

Conservation status
- Least Concern (IUCN 3.1)

Scientific classification
- Kingdom: Animalia
- Phylum: Chordata
- Class: Aves
- Order: Passeriformes
- Family: Pachycephalidae
- Genus: Pachycephala
- Species: P. hypoxantha

Binomial name
- Pachycephala hypoxantha (Sharpe, 1887)

Subspecies
- See text

Synonyms
- Hyloterpe hypoxantha

= Bornean whistler =

Species of bird

The Bornean whistler (Pachycephala hypoxantha) or Bornean mountain whistler, is a species of bird in the family Pachycephalidae. It is endemic to the island of Borneo.

== Subspecies ==
Two subspecies are recognized:

- P. h. hypoxantha – (Sharpe, 1887): found on northern Borneo (Malaysia)
- P. h. sarawacensis – Chasen, 1935: found in western Sarawak (Malaysia)
