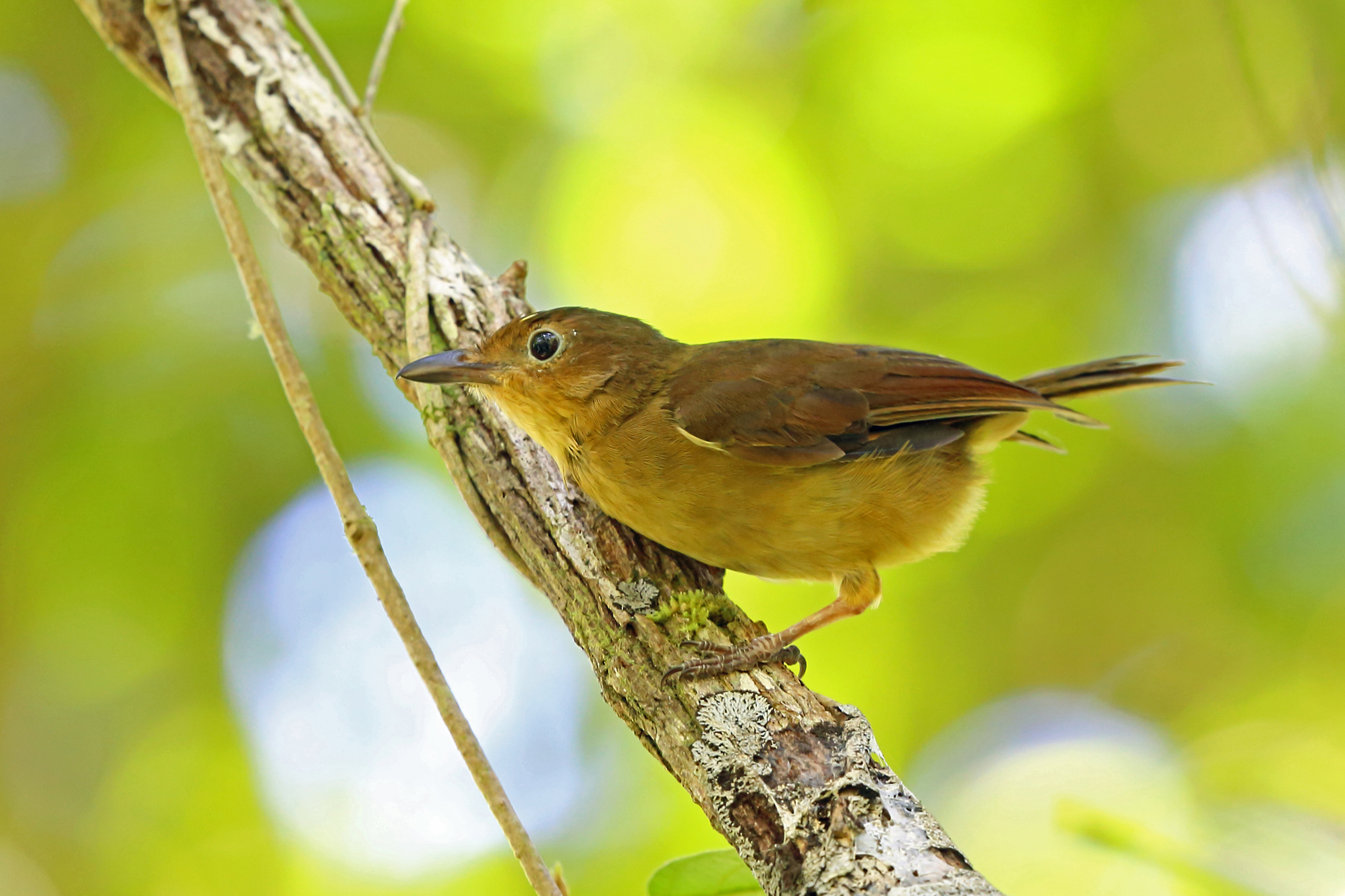

Scientific classification
- Kingdom: Animalia
- Phylum: Chordata
- Class: Aves
- Order: Passeriformes
- Family: Pachycephalidae
- Genus: Pachycephala
- Species: P. melanorhyncha

Binomial name
- Pachycephala melanorhyncha (A.B. Meyer, 1874)

= Biak whistler =

Species of bird

The Biak whistler (Pachycephala melanorhyncha) is a species of bird in the family Pachycephalidae. It is endemic to Biak in Indonesia. The Biak whistler is warm brown above, lighter below and features large eyes and a thick bill. Once considered to be a subspecies of the little shrikethrush.
