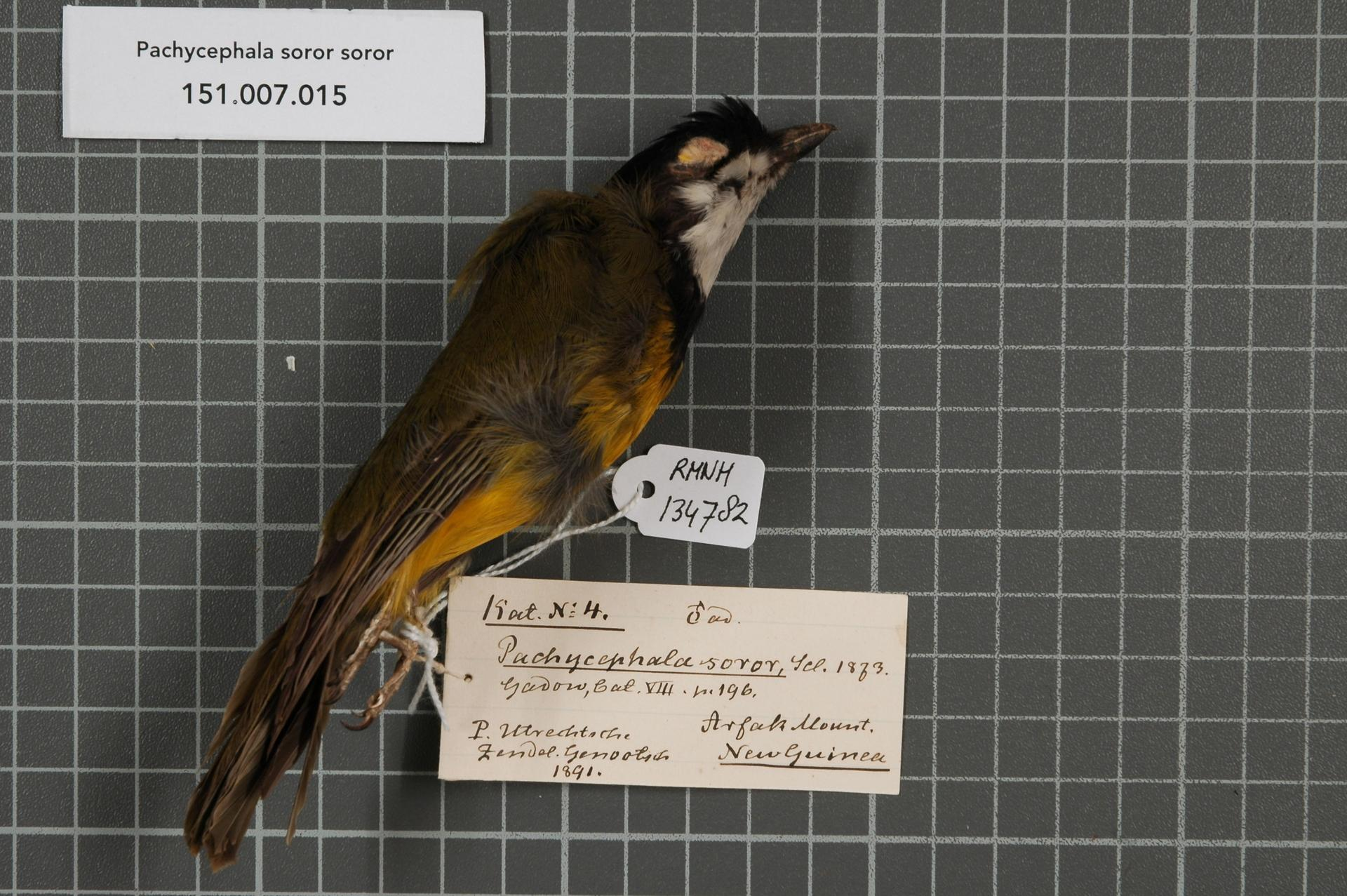

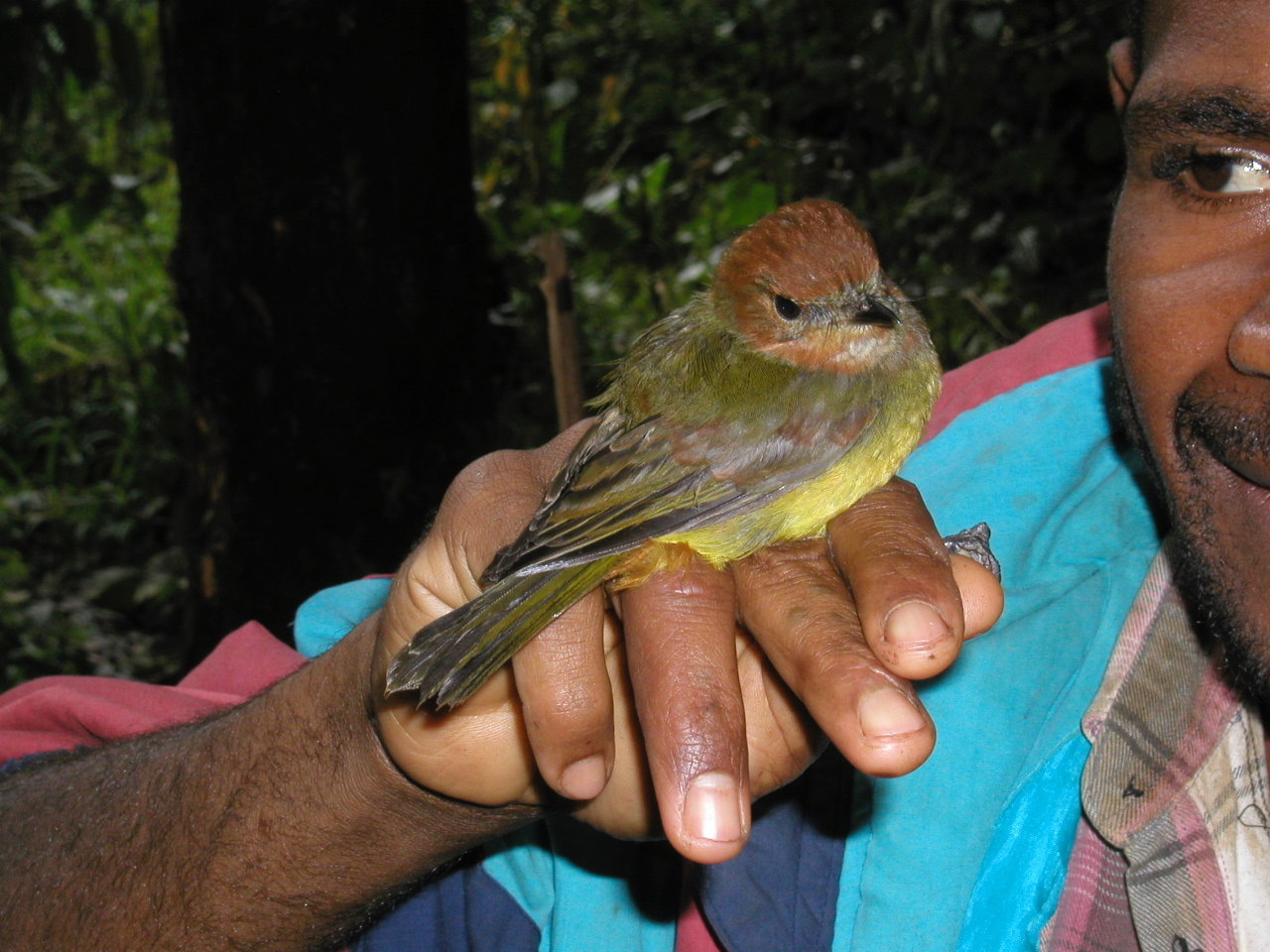
- Juvenile

Conservation status
- Least Concern (IUCN 3.1)

Scientific classification
- Kingdom: Animalia
- Phylum: Chordata
- Class: Aves
- Order: Passeriformes
- Family: Pachycephalidae
- Genus: Pachycephala
- Species: P. soror

Binomial name
- Pachycephala soror Sclater, PL, 1874

Subspecies
- See text

= Sclater's whistler =

Species of bird

Sclater's whistler (Pachycephala soror) or the hill golden whistler, is a species of bird in the family Pachycephalidae found in the highlands of New Guinea. Its natural habitats are subtropical or tropical moist lowland forests and subtropical or tropical moist montane forests.

The name commemorates the British zoologist Philip Lutley Sclater.

== Subspecies ==
Four subspecies are recognized:

- P. s. soror – Sclater, 1874: found in north-western New Guinea
- P. s. klossi – Ogilvie-Grant, 1915: found in central and eastern New Guinea
- P. s. octogenarii – Diamond, 1985: found in the Kumawa Mountains of western New Guinea
- P. s. bartoni – Ogilvie-Grant, 1915: found in south-eastern New Guinea and Goodenough Island
