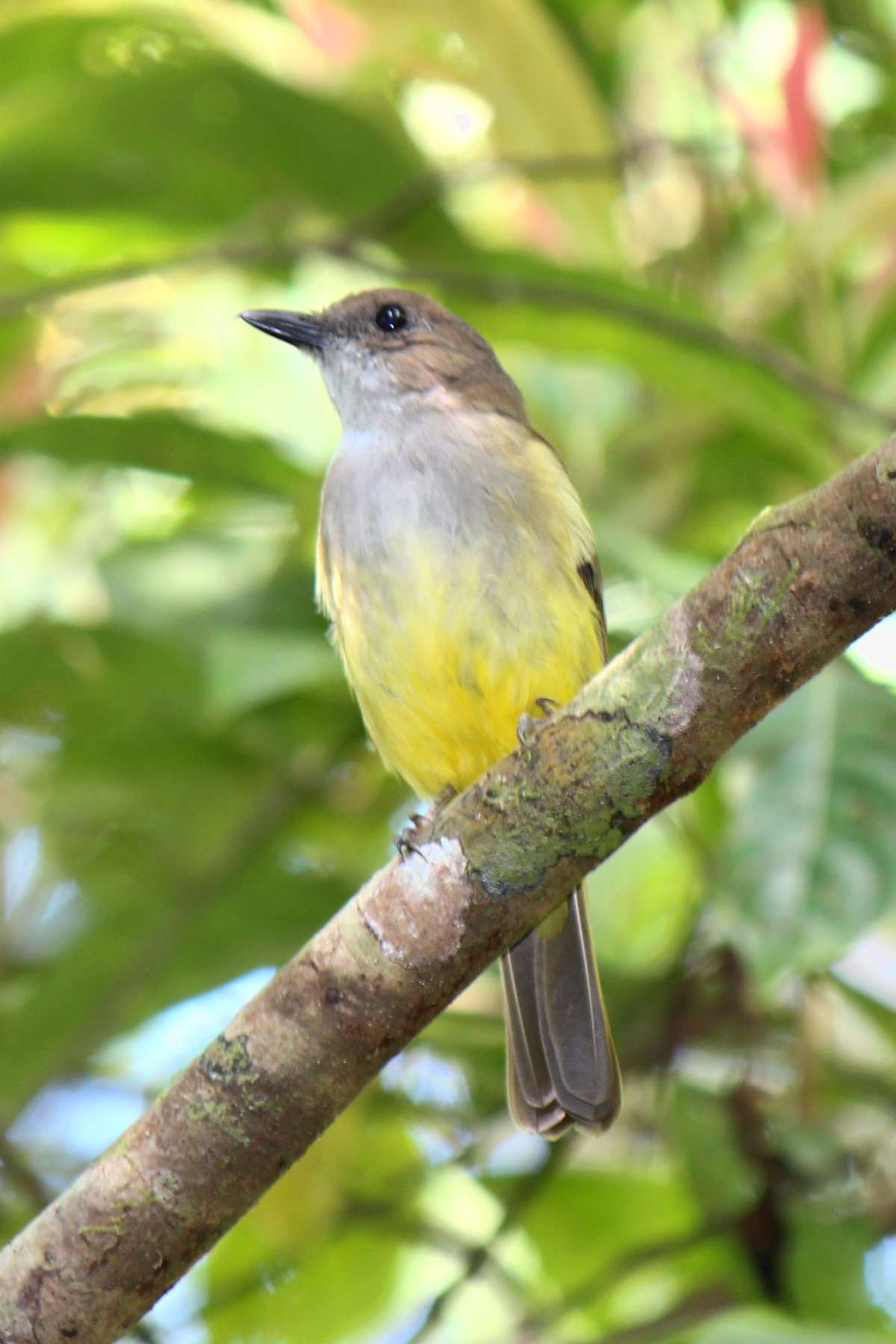

Conservation status
- Least Concern (IUCN 3.1)

Scientific classification
- Kingdom: Animalia
- Phylum: Chordata
- Class: Aves
- Order: Passeriformes
- Family: Pachycephalidae
- Genus: Pachycephala
- Species: P. sulfuriventer

Binomial name
- Pachycephala sulfuriventer (Walden, 1872)

Synonyms
- Hyloterpe sulfuriventer

= Sulphur-vented whistler =

Species of bird

The sulphur-vented whistler or sulphur-bellied whistler (Pachycephala sulfuriventer) is a species of bird in the family Pachycephalidae. It is endemic to Sulawesi in Indonesia. Its natural habitats are subtropical or tropical moist lowland forest and subtropical or tropical moist montane forest.

Alternate names for the sulphur-vented whistler include the Celebes mountain whistler, Celebes whistler and yellow-vented whistler.
