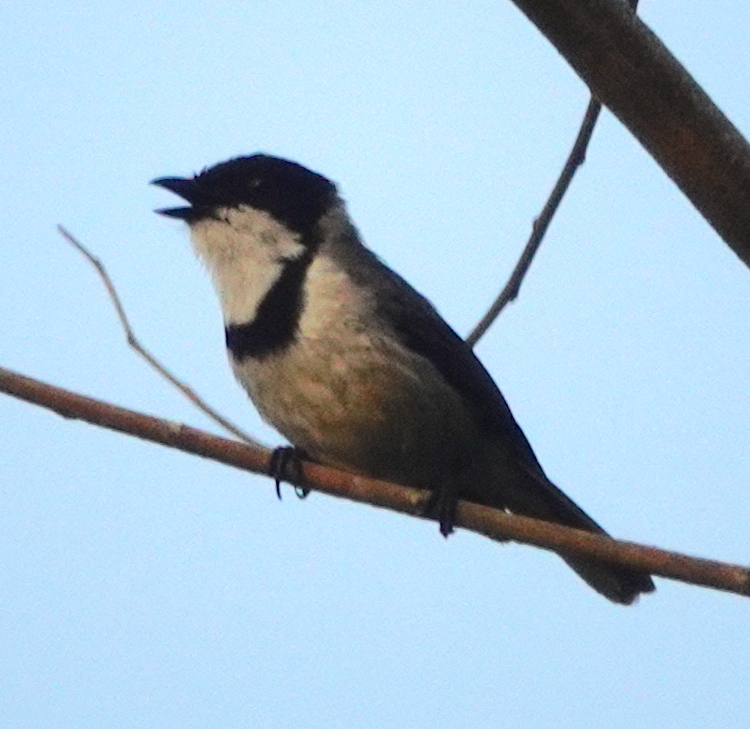
- subspecies kebirensis

Conservation status
- Least Concern (IUCN 3.1)

Scientific classification
- Kingdom: Animalia
- Phylum: Chordata
- Class: Aves
- Order: Passeriformes
- Family: Pachycephalidae
- Genus: Pachycephala
- Species: P. arctitorquis

Binomial name
- Pachycephala arctitorquis Sclater, PL, 1883

Subspecies
- See text

= Wallacean whistler =

Species of bird

The Wallacean whistler (Pachycephala arctitorquis) is a species of bird in the family Pachycephalidae. It is native to the eastern Lesser Sunda Islands. Its natural habitats are subtropical or tropical moist lowland forests and subtropical or tropical mangrove forests.

== Subspecies ==
Three subspecies are recognized:

- Pachycephala arctitorquis kebirensis - Meyer, AB, 1884: Originally described as a separate species. Found on eastern Lesser Sunda Islands
- Pachycephala arctitorquis arctitorquis - Sclater, 1883: Found on Tanimbar Islands
- Pachycephala arctitorquis tianduana - Hartert, 1901: Originally described as a separate species. Found on Tayandu Islands (southwest of New Guinea)
