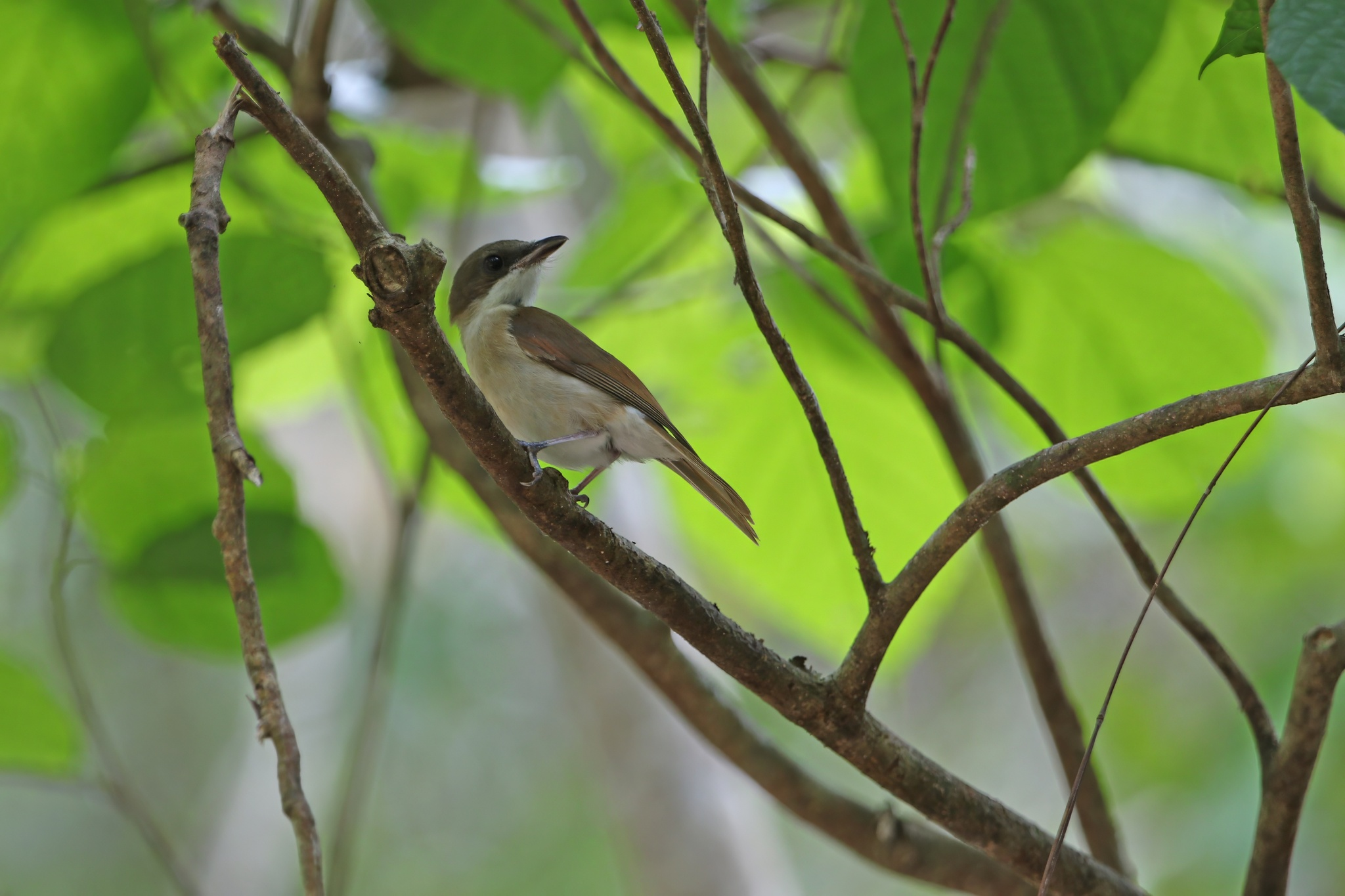

Conservation status
- Least Concern (IUCN 3.1)

Scientific classification
- Kingdom: Animalia
- Phylum: Chordata
- Class: Aves
- Order: Passeriformes
- Family: Pachycephalidae
- Genus: Pachycephala
- Species: P. phaionota

Binomial name
- Pachycephala phaionota (Bonaparte, 1850)

Synonyms
- Myiolestes phaionotus; Pachycephala phaionotum; Pachycephala phaionotus

= Island whistler =

Species of bird

The island whistler (Pachycephala phaionota) is a species of bird in the family Pachycephalidae native to the Moluccas and islands of Western New Guinea. Its natural habitats are subtropical or tropical dry forests and subtropical or tropical mangrove forests.

The island whistler was originally described in the genus Myiolestes (a synonym for Colluricincla).
