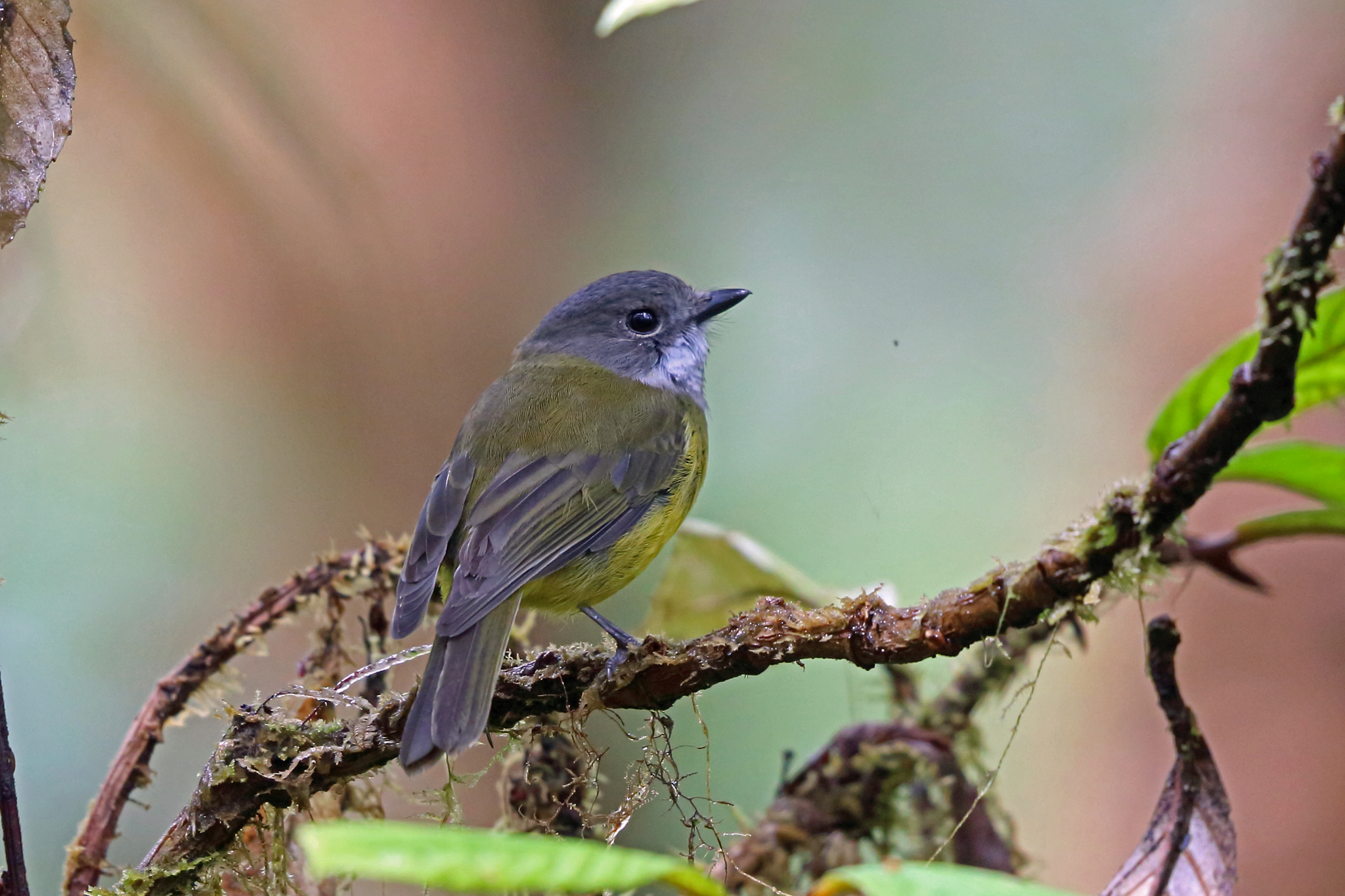

Conservation status
- Least Concern (IUCN 3.1)

Scientific classification
- Kingdom: Animalia
- Phylum: Chordata
- Class: Aves
- Order: Passeriformes
- Family: Pachycephalidae
- Genus: Pachycephala
- Species: P. meyeri

Binomial name
- Pachycephala meyeri Salvadori, 1890

= Vogelkop whistler =

Species of bird

The Vogelkop whistler (Pachycephala meyeri) is a species of bird in the family Pachycephalidae. It is endemic to West Papua, Indonesia. Its natural habitat is subtropical or tropical moist montane forests. During mating season, the bird builds their nest with blue things that attract the female vogelkop whistlers.

Alternate names for the Vogelkop whistler include the grey-crowned whistler and Meyer's whistler.
