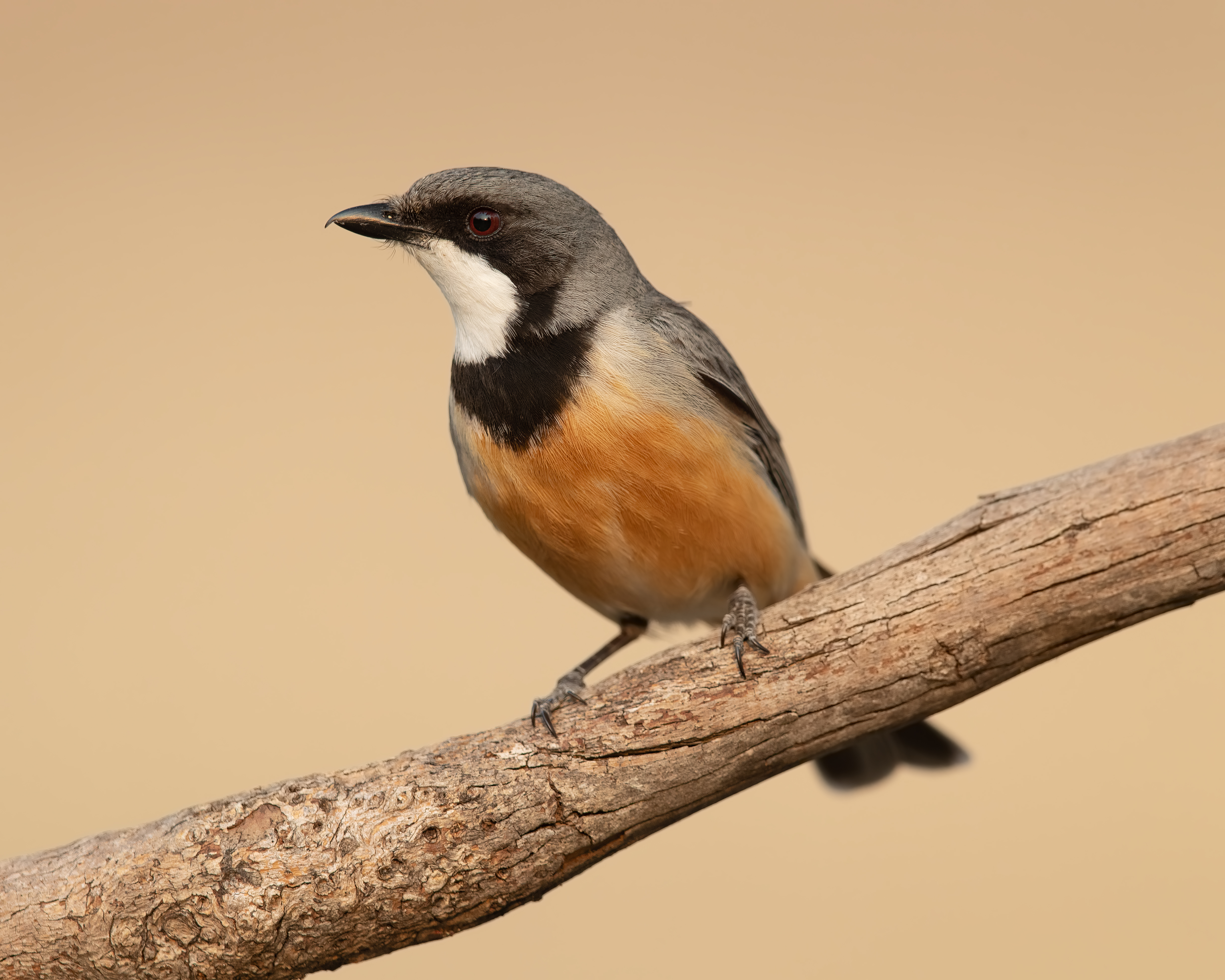
- Male
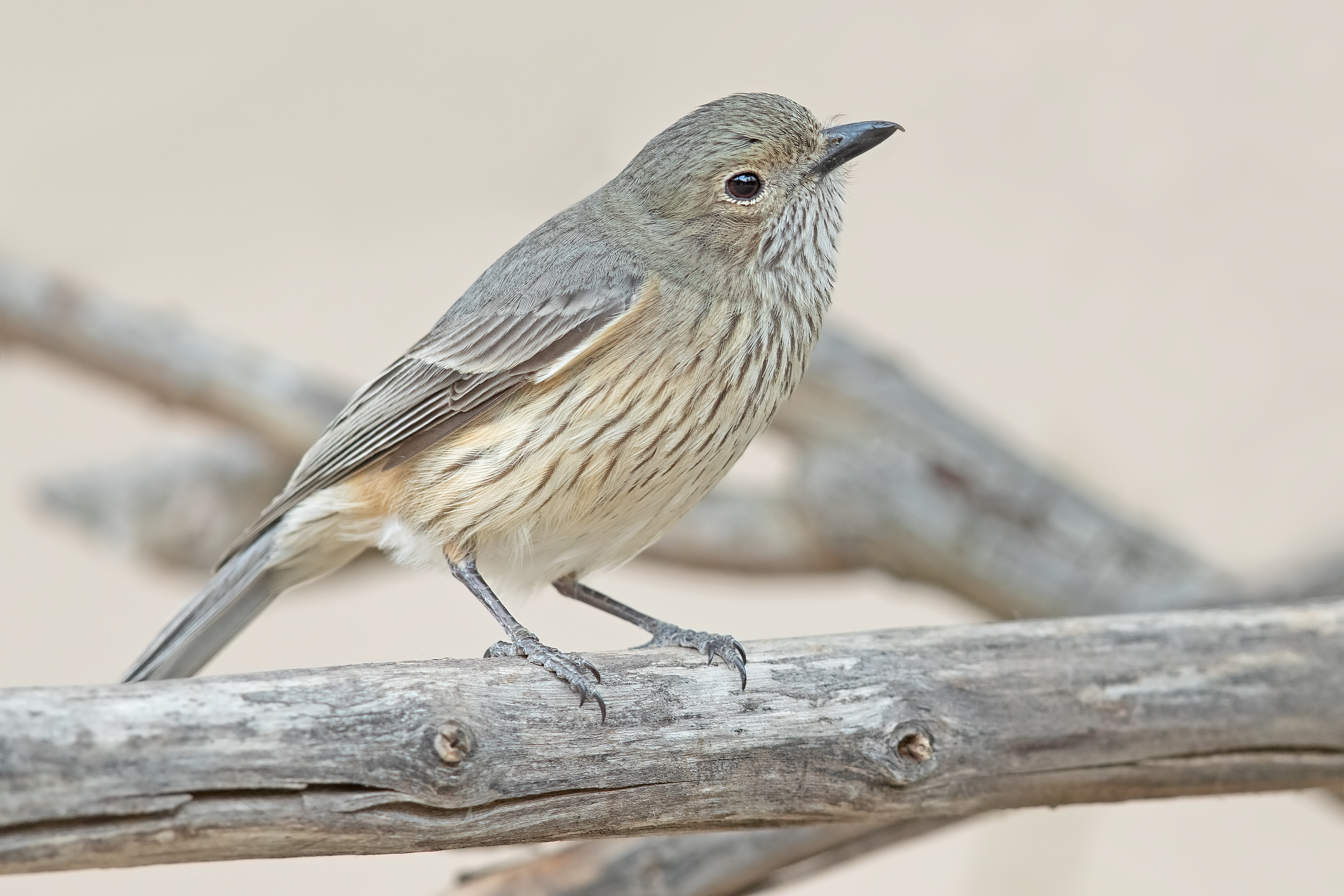
- Female

Conservation status
- Least Concern (IUCN 3.1)

Scientific classification
- Kingdom: Animalia
- Phylum: Chordata
- Class: Aves
- Order: Passeriformes
- Family: Pachycephalidae
- Genus: Pachycephala
- Species: P. rufiventris

Binomial name
- Pachycephala rufiventris (Latham, 1801)

Subspecies
- See text

Synonyms
- Laniarius rubrigaster; Lanius macularius; Lewinornis rufiventris; Pachycephala striata; Sylvia rufiventris; Turdus pectoralis; Turdus prasinus

= Rufous whistler =

Species of bird

The rufous whistler (Pachycephala rufiventris) is a species of whistler found in New Caledonia and Australia. Predominantly a reddish-brown and grey bird, it makes up for its subdued plumage with its song-making ability. Like many other members of the Pachycephalidae, it has a variety of musical calls.

== Taxonomy and systematics ==
The rufous whistler was originally described in the genus Sylvia by the English ornithologist John Latham in 1801. It was subsequently classified within the genera Turdus, Laniarius, and Lanius before being classified in its present genus, Pachycephala. Alternate names for the rufous whistler include the rufous-bellied whistler and white-bellied whistler. The latter name should not be confused with the species of the same name, Pachycephala leucogastra. Some authorities have considered the black-headed, drab, and cinnamon-breasted whistlers to be subspecies of the rufous whistler.

The Gamilaraay and Yuwaalaraay people of northern New South Wales use the names mulindjal or mulimuli to refer to this species.

=== Subspecies ===
Five subspecies are recognized:

- P. r. minor – Zietz, FR, 1914: Found on Melville and Bathurst Islands (off northern Australia)
- P. r. falcata – Gould, 1843: Originally described as a separate species. Found in northern Australia
- P. r. pallida – Ramsay, EP, 1878: Originally described as a separate species. Found in north-eastern Australia
- P. r. rufiventris – (Latham, 1801): Found in Australia (except northern Australia)
- P. r. xanthetraea – (Forster, JR, 1844): Originally described as a separate species in the genus Muscicapa. Found in New Caledonia

== Description ==
Singing male, south east Queensland, Australia

Rufous whistlers are large-headed and stocky. They have short beaks and long tails (almost as long as the rest of the bird) which are very narrow and have sharp, forked tips. The species is sexually dimorphic. While females are typically dull brown or grey with streaked underbodies, males have rufous underparts and predominantly dark-grey back and tail with white throats and (in most cases) a black mask that covers most of their head and some of their neck. These birds are between 16 and 18 centimetres (6.3 and 7.1 inches) in size, on average, and their normal weight is approximately 25 grams (0.88 ounces).

The rufous whistler has a variety of musical calls which consist of a lengthy series of ringing notes.

== Distribution and habitat ==
The rufous whistler can be found in forested areas, woodland, and shrubland, but also in gardens and farmland. It migrates seasonally, moving south in the spring and north in the autumn. In New Caledonia the species does not undertake migrations but is instead resident in areas of open forest and savannah.

== Behaviour and ecology ==
=== Breeding ===
Breeding in monogamous pairs, both males and females incubate their eggs and care for their young. The period of incubation is about 13 days on average. The female alone constructs the nest, which usually consists of a combination of twigs, vines, grass and other matter formed in a cup-like shape and attached to a tree branch using strands from spider webs. The breeding season for rufous whistlers is between the months of July and February.

=== Feeding ===
While rufous whistlers primarily feed on insects, they also eat seeds, fruit and occasionally, leaves and grasses. They never forage for food on the ground which is unusual for whistlers which typically do not forage at particularly high levels.
