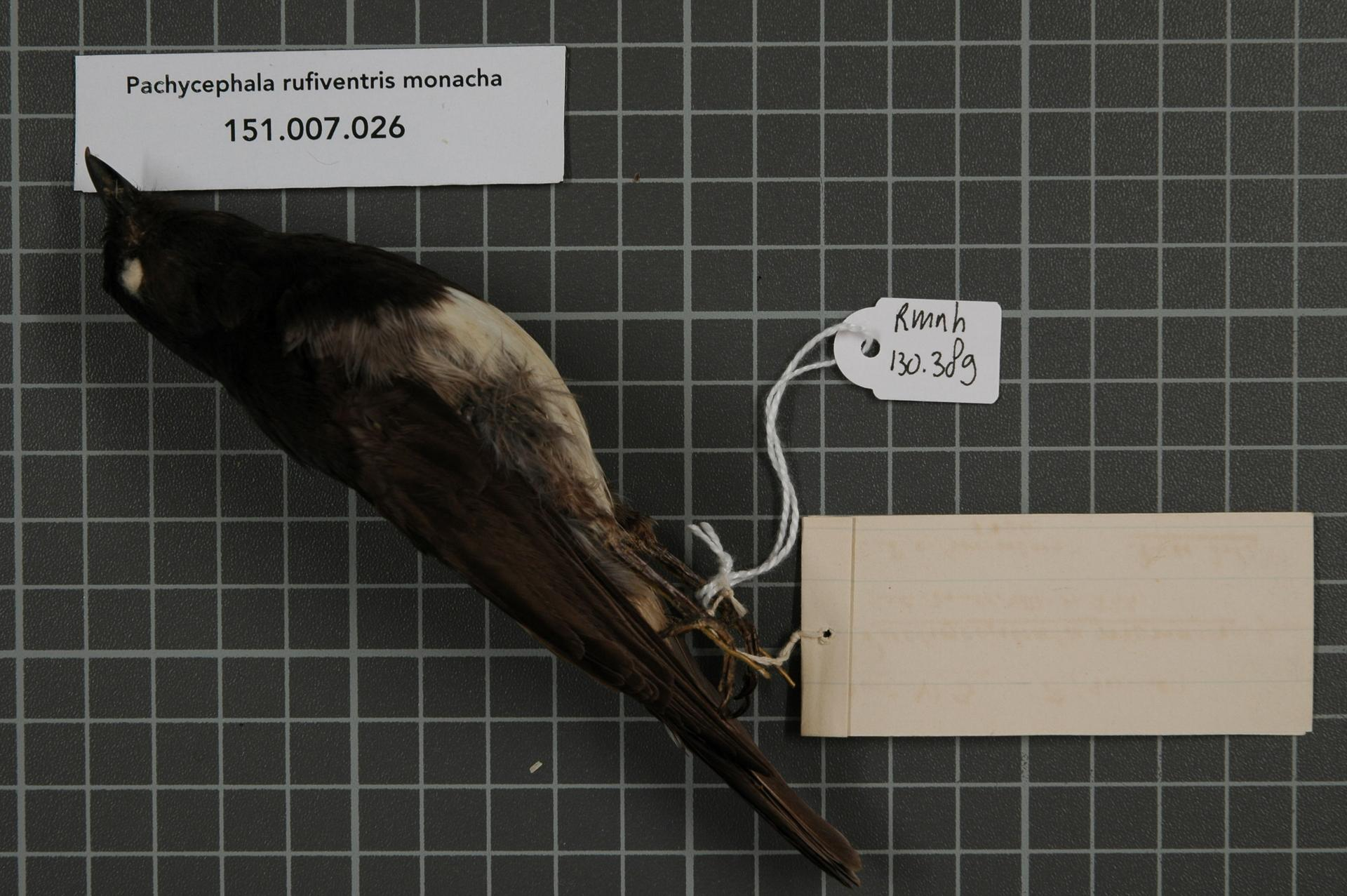

Conservation status
- Least Concern (IUCN 3.1)

Scientific classification
- Kingdom: Animalia
- Phylum: Chordata
- Class: Aves
- Order: Passeriformes
- Family: Pachycephalidae
- Genus: Pachycephala
- Species: P. monacha

Binomial name
- Pachycephala monacha Gray, GR, 1858

Subspecies
- See text

Synonyms
- Pachycephala rufiventris monacha

= Black-headed whistler =

Species of bird

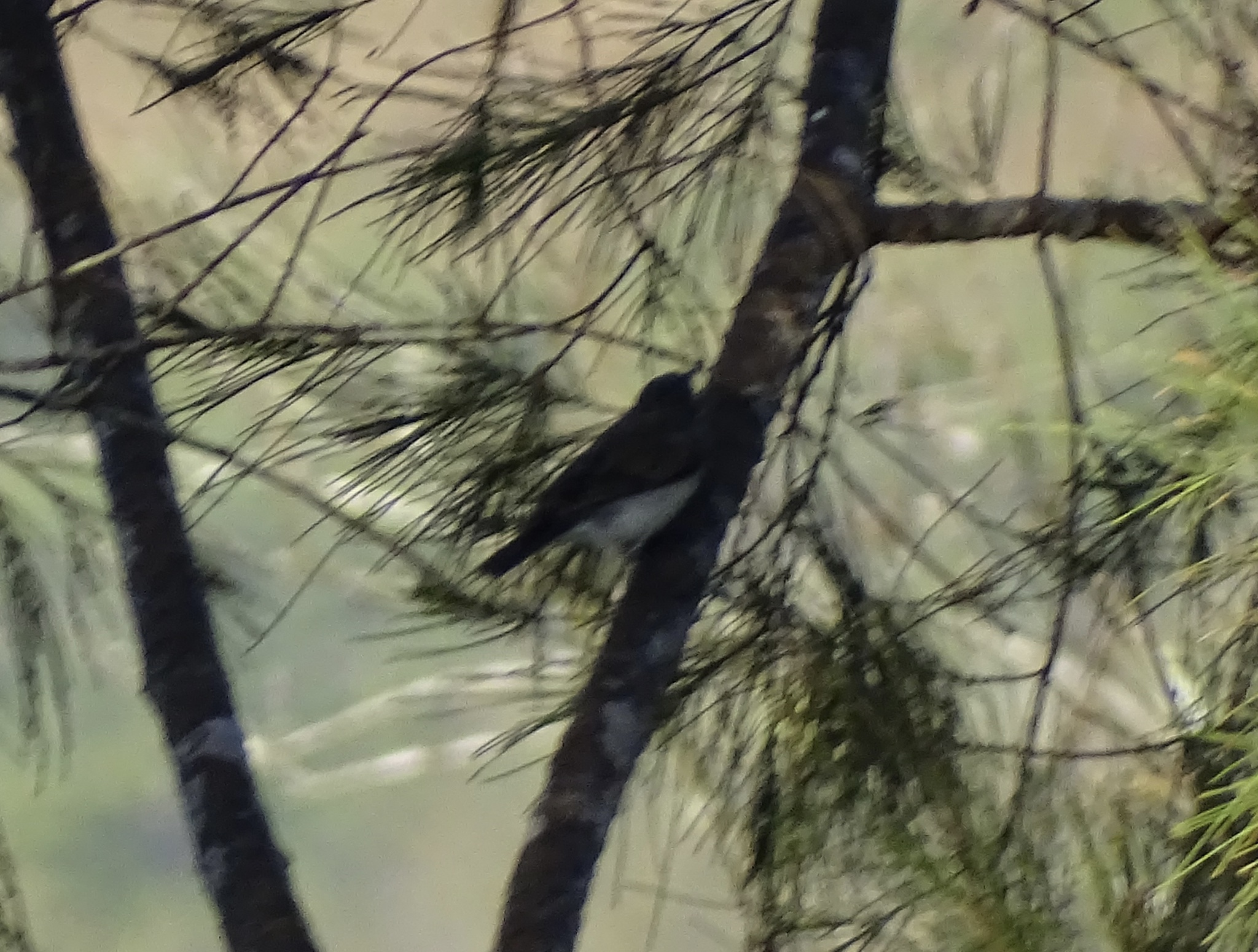
In tree

The black-headed whistler (Pachycephala monacha) is a species of bird in the family Pachycephalidae. It is found on the Aru Islands and New Guinea. Its natural habitat is subtropical or tropical moist lowland forests.

== Taxonomy and systematics ==
Some authorities have considered the black-headed whistler to be a subspecies of the rufous whistler.

=== Subspecies ===
Two subspecies are recognized:

- P. m. monacha – Gray, GR, 1858: Found on Aru Islands (off southwest New Guinea)
- P. m. lugubris – Salvadori, 1881: Found in central New Guinea
