= Hooded whistler =

Conservation status
- Least Concern (IUCN 3.1)

Scientific classification
- Kingdom: Animalia
- Phylum: Chordata
- Class: Aves
- Order: Passeriformes
- Family: Pachycephalidae
- Genus: Pachycephala
- Species: P. implicata

Binomial name
- Pachycephala implicata Hartert, 1929
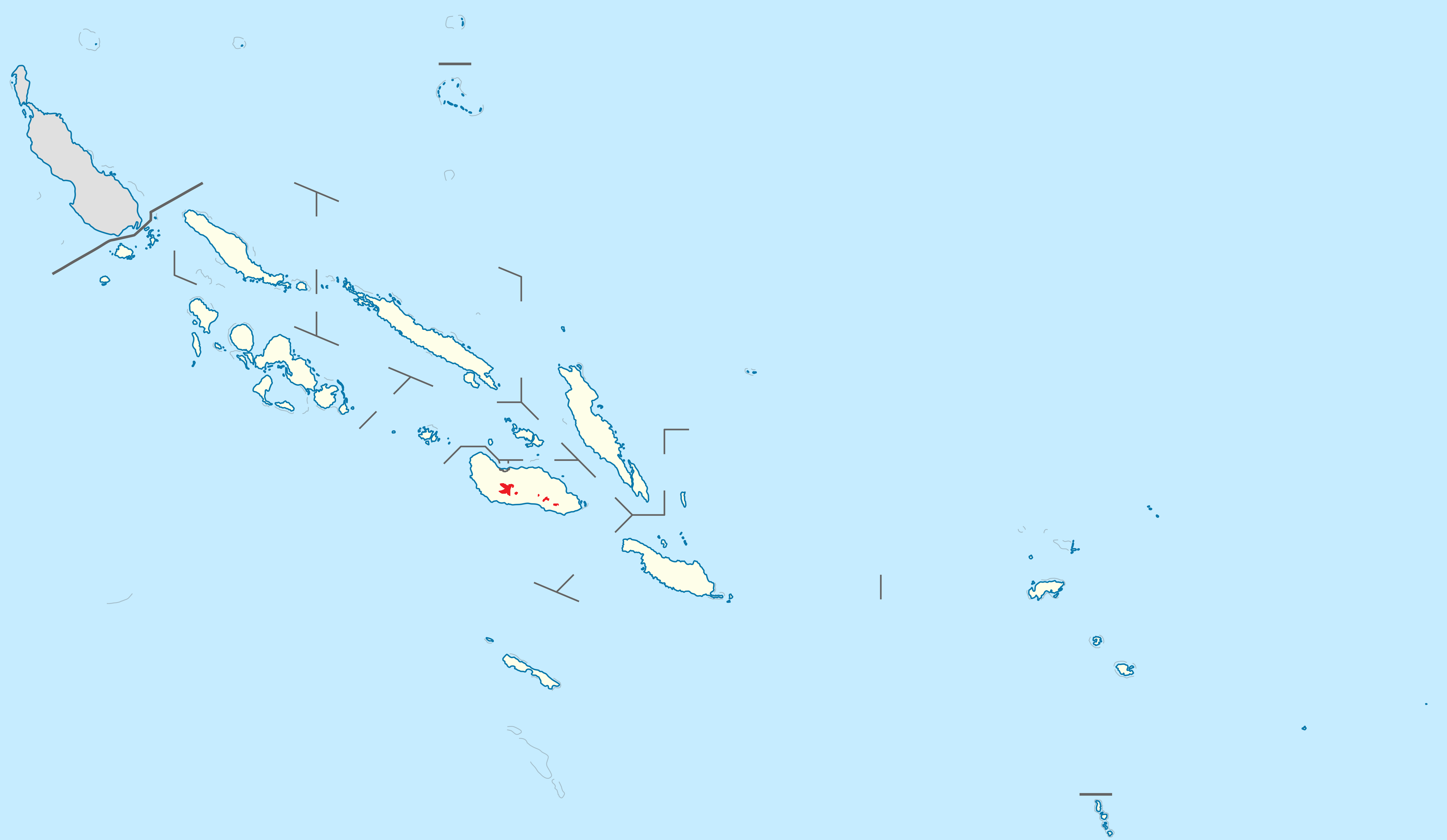

Species of bird

The hooded whistler (Pachycephala implicata) or Guadalcanal hooded whistler is a species of bird in the family Pachycephalidae. It is found on Guadalcanal in the Solomon Islands. Its natural habitat is subtropical or tropical moist montane forest. Prior to 2014, the Bougainville whistler was considered conspecific with the Hooded whistler.
