= Bougainville whistler =

Conservation status
- Least Concern (IUCN 3.1)

Scientific classification
- Kingdom: Animalia
- Phylum: Chordata
- Class: Aves
- Order: Passeriformes
- Family: Pachycephalidae
- Genus: Pachycephala
- Species: P. richardsi

Binomial name
- Pachycephala richardsi Mayr, 1932

Synonyms
- Pachycephala implicata richardsi

Species of bird

The Bougainville whistler (Pachycephala richardsi) or Bougainville hooded whistler, is a species of bird in the family Pachycephalidae. It is found on Bougainville Island, east of New Guinea. Its natural habitat is subtropical or tropical moist montane forests. The Bougainville whistler was split from the Hooded whistler in 2014.

The bird is named after Guy Richards, one of the expedition members on the Whitney South Sea Expedition which collected birds from the Pacific for the American Museum of Natural History.
