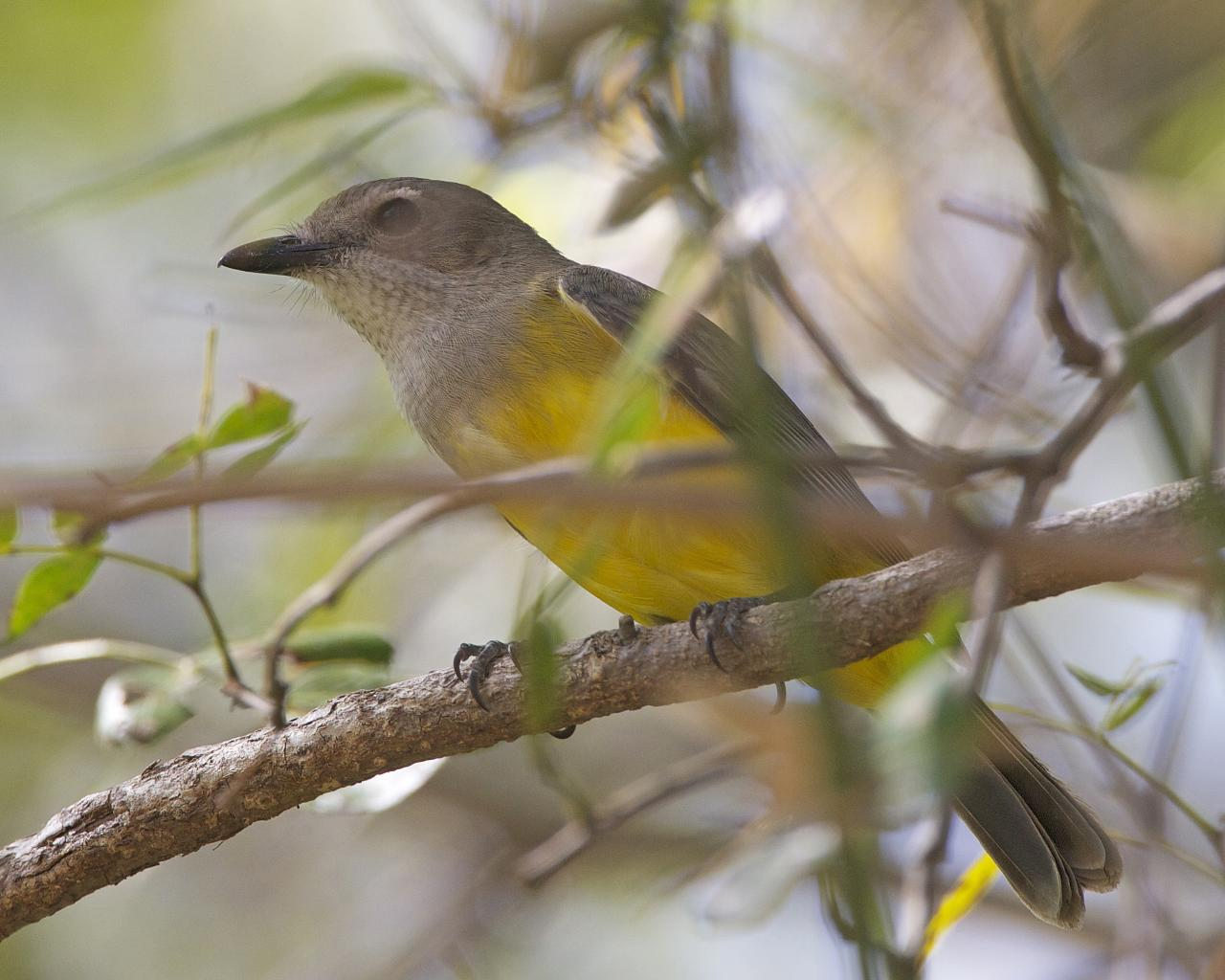
- Female Pachycephala melanura robusta

Conservation status
- Least Concern (IUCN 3.1)

Scientific classification
- Kingdom: Animalia
- Phylum: Chordata
- Class: Aves
- Order: Passeriformes
- Family: Pachycephalidae
- Genus: Pachycephala
- Species: P. melanura

Binomial name
- Pachycephala melanura Gould, 1843

Subspecies
- See text

= Mangrove golden whistler =

Species of bird

The mangrove golden whistler (Pachycephala melanura) or black-tailed whistler, is a species of bird in the family Pachycephalidae. It is found in mangrove forests and adjacent wet forests of Papua New Guinea and Australia.

== Subspecies ==
Five subspecies are recognized:

- Pachycephala melanura dahli - Reichenow, 1897: Found in the Bismarck Archipelago and south-eastern New Guinea
- Robust whistler (P. m. spinicaudus) - Mathews, 1912: Originally described as a separate species in the genus Pteruthius. Found in southern New Guinea and islands in the Torres Strait
- P. m. violetae - (Pucheran, 1853): Found in northern Australia
- P. m. melanura - Gould, 1843: Found in north-western Australia
- P. m. robusta - Masters, 1876: This subspecies is also called "robust whistler". Found in northern Australia
