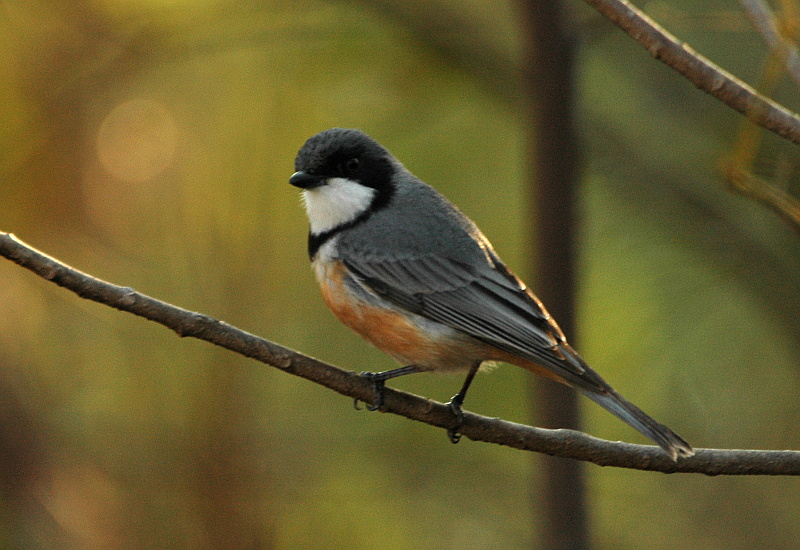
- Adult male rufous whistler (Pachycephala rufiventris)

Scientific classification
- Kingdom: Animalia
- Phylum: Chordata
- Class: Aves
- Order: Passeriformes
- Family: Pachycephalidae
- Subfamily: Pachycephalinae
- Genus: Pachycephala; Vigors, 1825

Type species
- Muscicapa pectoralis Latham, 1801

Synonyms
- Alisterornis; Hyloterpe; Lewinornis; Muscitrea

= Pachycephala =

Genus of birds

Pachycephala is a genus of birds native to Oceania and Southeast Asia. They are commonly known as typical whistlers. Older guidebooks may refer to them as thickheads, a literal translation of the genus name, which is derived from Ancient Greek παχύς (pakhús), meaning "thick", and κεφαλή (kephalḗ), meaning "head". This lineage originated in Australo-Papua and later colonized the Indonesian and Philippine archipelagos to the west and the Pacific archipelagos to the east.

== Taxonomy ==
The genus Pachycephala was introduced in 1825 by the Irish zoologist Nicholas Vigors with the Australian golden whistler as the type species. The name is derived from Ancient Greek παχύς (pakhús), meaning "thick", and κεφαλή (kephalḗ), meaning "head".

There have been big changes to the species limits in the genus Pachycephala. In 2007 Walter Boles in the Handbook of the Birds of the World recognised 21 species in the genus but in 2025 AviList recognised 51 species.

The genus contains 51 species:

- Olive whistler, Pachycephala olivacea
- Red-lored whistler, Pachycephala rufogularis
- Gilbert's whistler, Pachycephala inornata
- Bare-throated whistler, Pachycephala nudigula
- Fawn-breasted whistler, Pachycephala orpheus
- Regent whistler, Pachycephala schlegelii
- Melanesian whistler, Pachycephala chlorura
- Vogelkop whistler, Pachycephala meyeri
- Sclater's whistler, Pachycephala soror
- White-throated Fiji whistler, Pachycephala vitiensis (formerly Fiji whistler before split)
- Yellow-throated Fiji whistler, Pachycephala graeffii (split from P. vitiensis)
- Samoan whistler, Pachycephala flavifrons
- Tongan whistler, Pachycephala jacquinoti
- New Caledonian whistler, Pachycephala caledonica
- Hooded whistler, Pachycephala implicata
- Bougainville whistler, Pachycephala richardsi
- Bismarck whistler, Pachycephala citreogaster
- Louisiade whistler, Pachycephala collaris
- Nendo whistler, Pachycephala ornata (split from P. vanikorensis)
- Utupua whistler, Pachycephala utupuae (split from P. vanikorensis)
- Vanikoro whistler, Pachycephala vanikorensis (formerly Temotu whistler before splits)
- Oriole whistler, Pachycephala orioloides
- Rennell whistler, Pachycephala feminina
- Tenggara whistler, Pachycephala calliope (formerly P. fulvotincta and formerly rusty-breasted whistler)
- Selayar whistler, Pachycephala teysmanni (split from P. calliope)
- Yellow-throated whistler, Pachycephala macrorhyncha
- Babar whistler, Pachycephala sharpei (split from P. macrorhyncha)
- Black-chinned whistler, Pachycephala mentalis
- Baliem whistler, Pachycephala balim
- Australian golden whistler, Pachycephala pectoralis (includes western whistler)
- Mangrove golden whistler, Pachycephala melanura
- Morningbird, Pachycephala tenebrosa
- Brown-backed whistler, Pachycephala modesta
- Lorentz's whistler, Pachycephala lorentzi
- Golden-backed whistler, Pachycephala aurea
- Yellow-bellied whistler, Pachycephala philippinensis
- Bornean whistler, Pachycephala hypoxantha
- Sulphur-vented whistler, Pachycephala sulfuriventer
- Mangrove whistler, Pachycephala cinerea
- Green-backed whistler, Pachycephala albiventris
- White-vented whistler, Pachycephala homeyeri
- Island whistler, Pachycephala phaionota
- Biak whistler, Pachycephala melanorhyncha
- Rusty whistler, Pachycephala hyperythra
- Grey whistler, Pachycephala simplex
- Wallacean whistler, Pachycephala arctitorquis
- Drab whistler, Pachycephala griseonota (includes cinnamon-breasted whistler)
- White-bellied whistler, Pachycephala leucogastra
- Black-headed whistler, Pachycephala monacha
- Rufous whistler, Pachycephala rufiventris
- White-breasted whistler, Pachycephala lanioides

=== Former species ===
Formerly, some authorities also considered the following species (or subspecies) as species within the genus Pachycephala:

- Maroon-backed whistler (as Pachycephala raveni)
- Little shrikethrush (fortis) (as Pachycephala fortis)

An unidentified Pachycephala whistler was heard on May 14, 1994 at 1,000 meters ASL south of the summit of Camiguin in the Philippines, where the genus was not previously known to occur. It might have been an undescribed taxon, or simply a vagrant of a known species.
