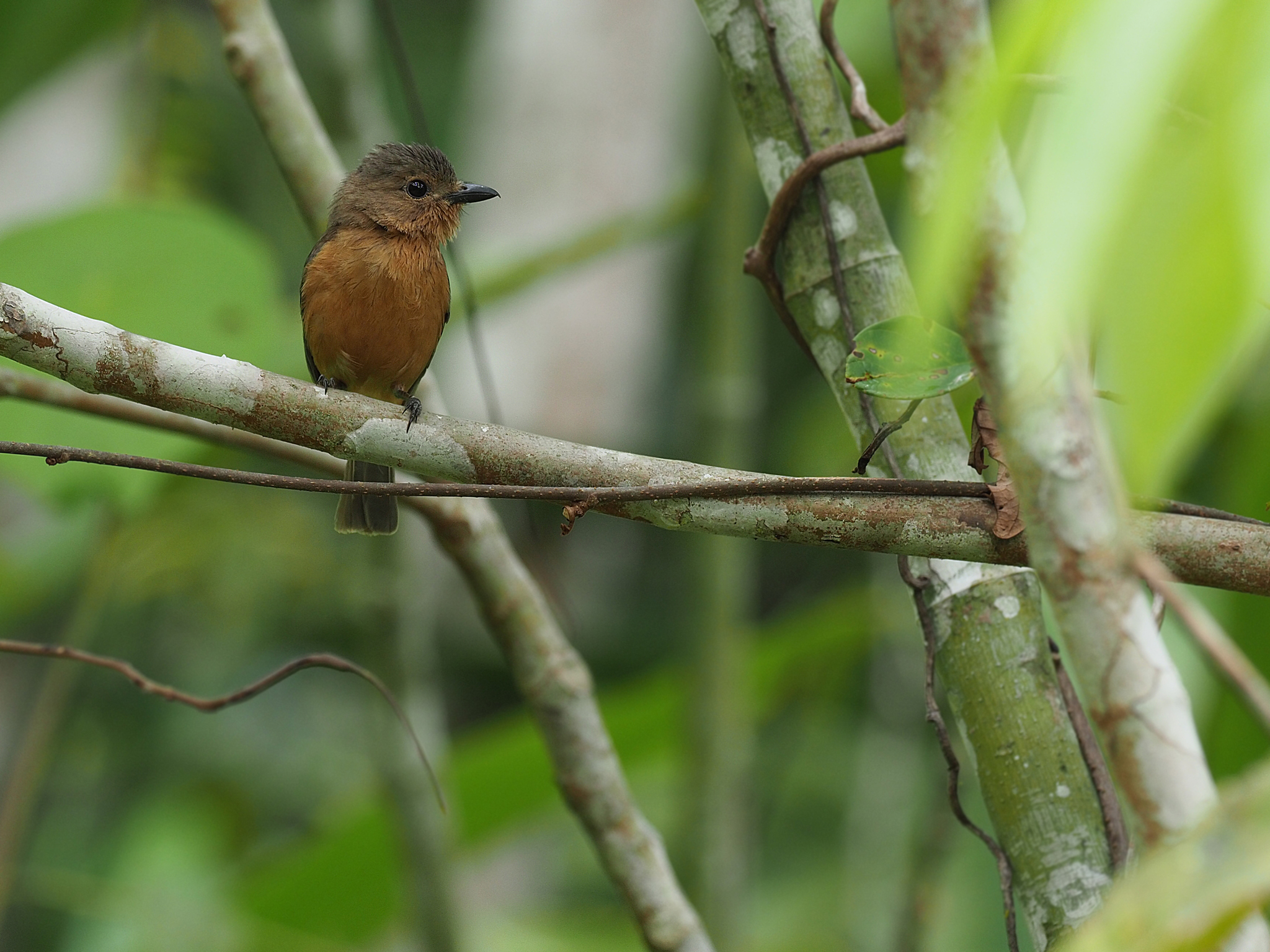

Conservation status
- Least Concern (IUCN 3.1)

Scientific classification
- Kingdom: Animalia
- Phylum: Chordata
- Class: Aves
- Order: Passeriformes
- Family: Pachycephalidae
- Genus: Pachycephala
- Species: P. griseonota

Binomial name
- Pachycephala griseonota G.R. Gray, 1862

Subspecies
- See text

= Drab whistler =

Species of bird

The drab whistler (Pachycephala griseonota) is a species of bird in the family Pachycephalidae. It is found in the Maluku Islands. Its natural habitat is subtropical or tropical moist lowland forests.

== Taxonomy ==
The drab whistler was formally described in 1862 as Pachycephala griseonota by the English zoologist George Gray. The specific epiphet is from Medieval Latin griseum meaning "grey". Gray mistakenly believed that his specimen had been collected on the island of Mysol which lies to the west of New Guinea. The locality has been corrected to the larger island of Seram.

Six subspecies are recognised:

- P. g. lineolata Wallace, AR, 1863 – Peleng, in Banggai Island, and Taliabu, Seho, and Sanana, in Sula Islands (off eastern Sulawesi)
- P. g. cinerascens Salvadori, AT, 1878 – northern Moluccas (Morotai, Halmahera, Ternate, Tidore, and Bacan Islands)
- P. g. examinata Hartert, EJO, 1898 – Buru (southern Moluccas)
- P. g. griseonota Gray, GR, 1862 – Seram (southern Moluccas)
- P. g. kuehni Hartert, EJO, 1898 – Kai Islands (Kai Kecil and Kai Besar)
- P. g. johni Hartert, EJO, 1903 – Obi Islands (northern Moluccas)

The subspecies P. g. johni has sometimes been considered as a separate species, the cinnamon-breasted whistler. A molecular phylogenetic study by Serina Brady and collaborators published in 2021 compared nuclear sequences and found that P. g. johni was closely related to P. g. cinerascens. The study did not sample the nominate P. g. griseonota nor the other subspecies.
