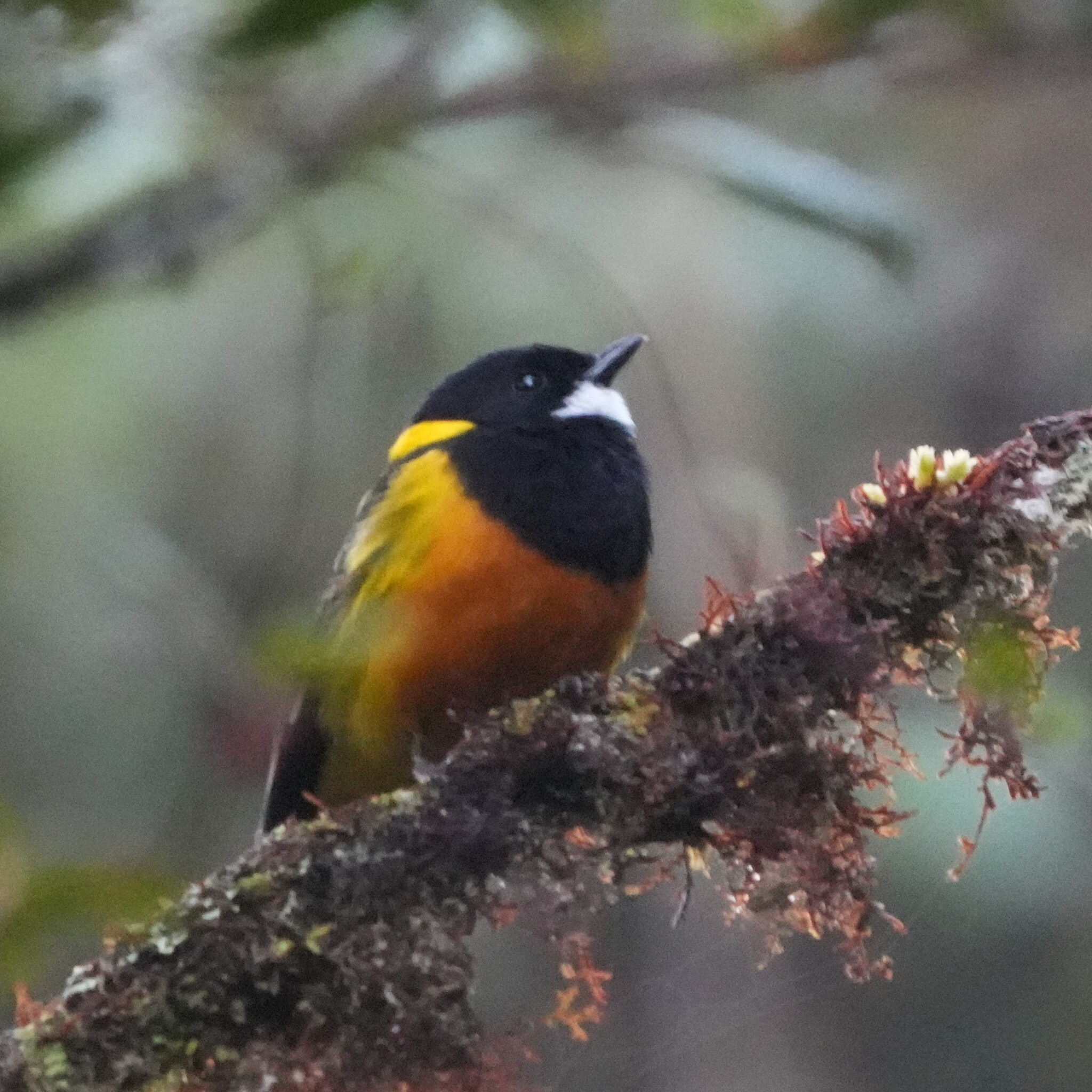
- Male
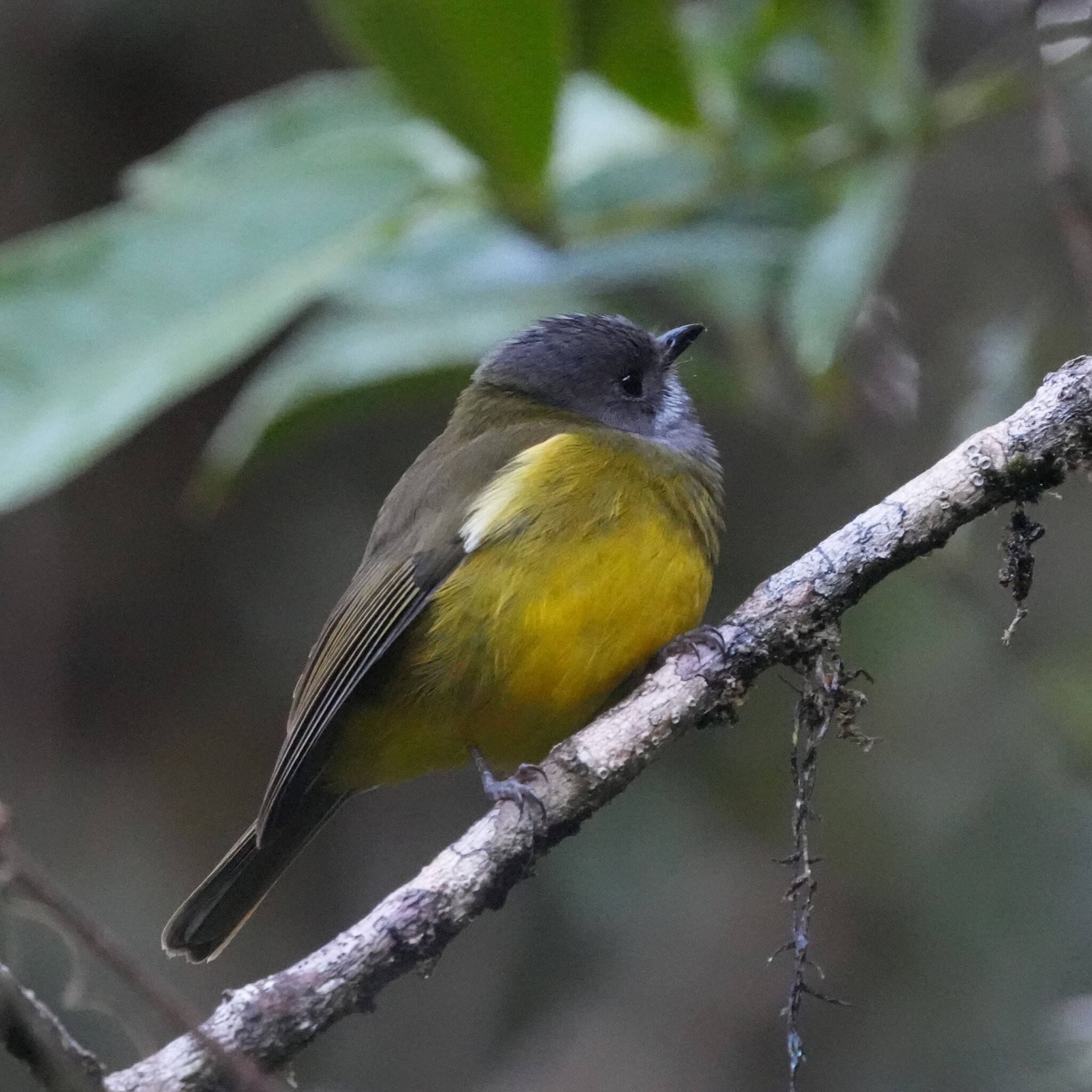
- Female

Conservation status
- Least Concern (IUCN 3.1)

Scientific classification
- Kingdom: Animalia
- Phylum: Chordata
- Class: Aves
- Order: Passeriformes
- Family: Pachycephalidae
- Genus: Pachycephala
- Species: P. schlegelii

Binomial name
- Pachycephala schlegelii Schlegel, 1871

Subspecies
- See text

= Regent whistler =

Species of bird

The regent whistler (Pachycephala schlegelii) is a species of bird in the family Pachycephalidae. It is endemic to the highlands of New Guinea. Its natural habitat is subtropical or tropical moist montane forests. The bird is known to carry batrachotoxin in its plumage.

== Subspecies ==
Three subspecies are recognized:

- P. s. schlegelii – Schlegel, 1871: Found in northwest New Guinea
- P. s. cyclopum – Hartert, 1930: Found in north-central New Guinea
- P. s. obscurior – Hartert, 1896: Found in west-central to eastern New Guinea
