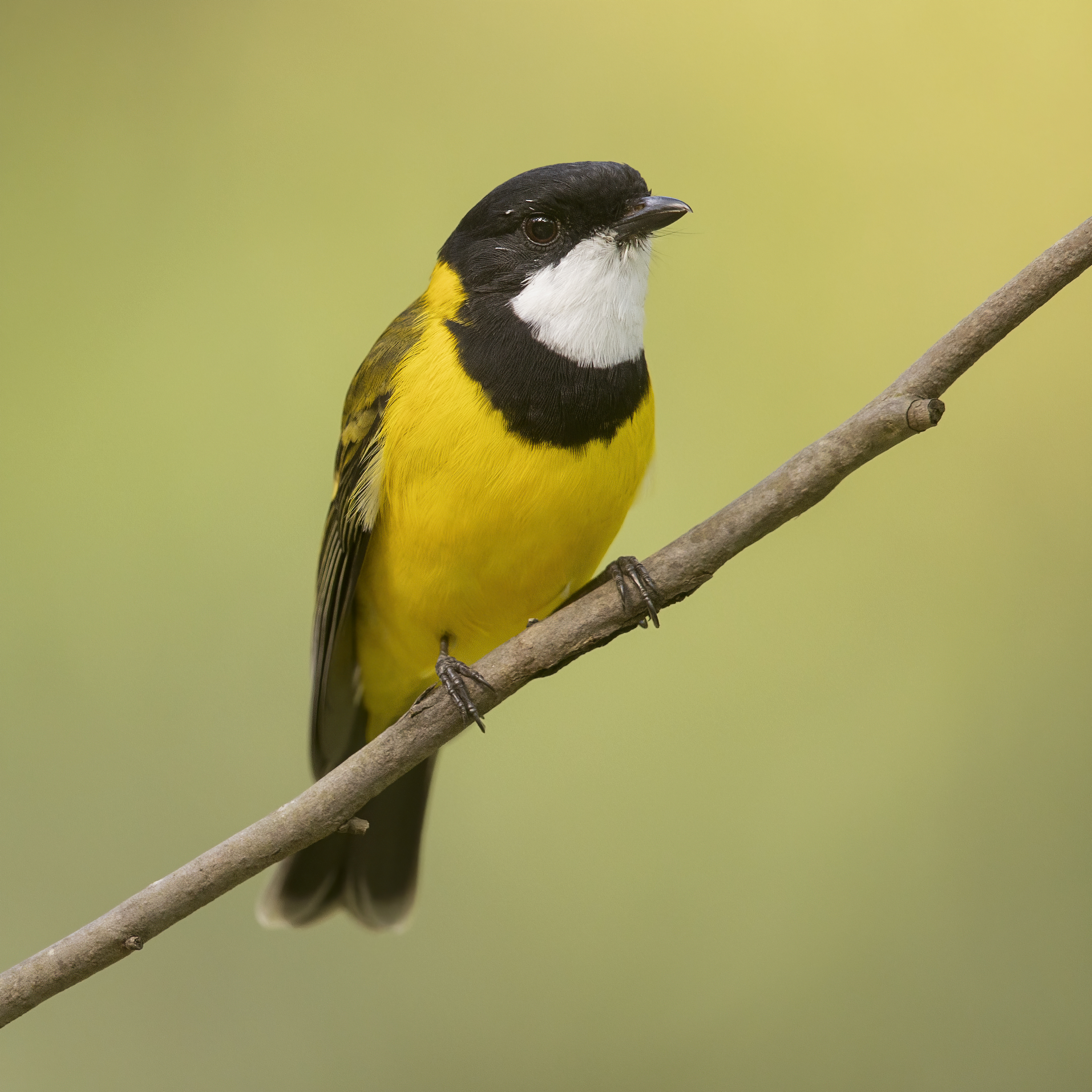
- Male
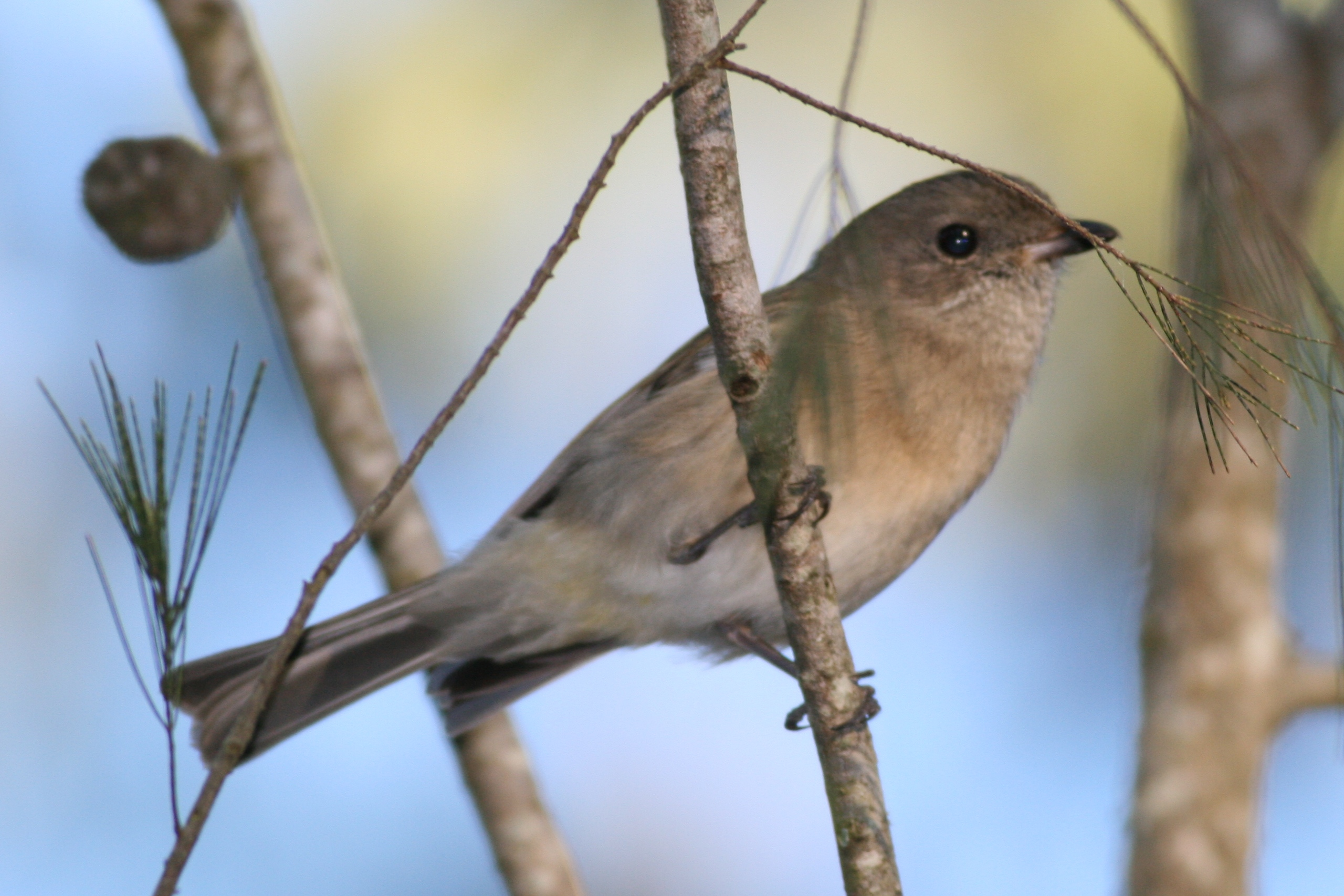
- Female, Queensland, Australia

Conservation status
- Least Concern (IUCN 3.1)

Scientific classification
- Kingdom: Animalia
- Phylum: Chordata
- Class: Aves
- Order: Passeriformes
- Family: Pachycephalidae
- Genus: Pachycephala
- Species: P. pectoralis

Binomial name
- Pachycephala pectoralis (Latham, 1801)

Subspecies
- See text

Synonyms
- Muscicapa pectoralis; Pachycephala gutturalis

= Australian golden whistler =

Species of bird

The Australian golden whistler (Pachycephala pectoralis) or golden whistler, is a species of passerine bird in the family Pachycephalidae. It is found in forest, woodland, mallee, mangrove and scrub in Australia (except the interior and most of the north). Most populations are resident, but some in south-eastern Australia migrate north during the winter. Its taxonomy is highly complex and remains a matter of dispute, with some authorities including as many as 59 subspecies of the golden whistler (one of the highest numbers of subspecies in any bird), while others treat several of these as separate species.

== Taxonomy ==
The Australian golden whistler was formally described in 1802 as Muscicapa pectoralis by the English ornithologist John Latham. The specific epithet is Latin meaning "of the breast" or "pectoral". A year earlier he had described the species under the English name, the "black-breasted flycatcher", but had not coined a binomial name. Latham gave the type locality as Nova Hollandia in Australia but this was restricted to Port Jackson, Sydney, New South Wales by Gregory Mathews in 1920. The Australian golden whistler is now placed in the genus Pachycephala that was introduced in 1825 by the Irish zoologist Nicholas Vigors. This bird was formerly known as white-throated thickhead.

In the 21st century there have been big changes to the species limits in the genus Pachycephala. In 2007 Walter Boles in the Handbook of the Birds of the World listed 59 subspecies of the golden whistler but many of these are now considered as separate species. Boles recognised 21 species in the genus but AviList in 2025 listed 51 species.

Seven subspecies are now recognised:

- P. p. occidentalis Ramsay, EP, 1878 – southwestern Australia (Shark Bay to Eucla)
- P. p. fuliginosa Vigors, NA & Horsfield, T, 1827 – south-central Australia (southwestern South Australia eastward to southeastern South Australia and southwestern New South Wales)
- P. p. glaucura Gould, J, 1845 – Tasmania and Flinders Island (Bass Strait)
- P. p. youngi Mathews, GM, 1912 – breeds southeastern Australia (central New South Wales to southwestern Victoria); winters to north
- P. p. pectoralis (Latham, J, 1801) – eastern Australia (Wet Tropics region, northern Queensland, southward to Hunter River, New South Wales)
- P. p. contempta Hartert, EJO, 1898 – Lord Howe Island (east of Australia)
- P. p. xanthoprocta Gould, J, 1838 – Norfolk Island (east of Australia)

The subspecies P. p. fuliginosa and P. p. occidentalis have sometimes been treated as a separate species, the western whistler. A molecular phylogenetic study by Serina Brady and collaborators published in 2021 compared nuclear sequences and found that P. p. fuliginosa and P. p. occidentalis were closely related to P. p. youngi. The study did not sample the nominate P. p. pectoralis nor the two insular subspecies.

== Description ==
The male has a bright yellow underside and nape, olive-green back and wings, a black head and chest-band, and a white throat. A notable exception is the Norfolk golden whistler (P. p. xanthoprocta) where the plumage of the male is female-like. In Australia females are overall dull brownish-grey, though some have yellowish undertail coverts. Both sexes have a black bill, dark legs and red-brown eyes. For subspecies P. p. contempta, the Lord Howe golden whistler, the male is similar to the male of the nominate race but has a duller yellow below which is slightly tinged with olive. The base of the tail is olive. For subspecies P. p. xanthoprocta, the Norfolk golden whistler, the male is similar in appearance to the female of the nominate race but the upperparts are more olive and the lower breast and belly are paler yellow.

Australian golden whistlers are described as having a strong, musical voice.

== Distribution and habitat ==
The Australian golden whistler can be found in almost any wooded habitat, especially dense forests. It eats berries, insects, spiders, and other small arthropods. They usually feed alone and obtain food from the lower to middle tree level, or they may alternatively take part in mixed-species feeding flocks.

== Behaviour ==
This species breeds between September and January. Male and female both work on the nest, which is a shallow bowl made of twigs, grass, and bark, and bound together with spider web. Only one brood is raised per season and both birds share incubation and care of young. Eggs hatch 15 days after they are laid and the young leave the nest after 12 days.

== Conservation status ==
The Australian golden whistler is considered to be of least concern, and it is generally described as common to fairly common.

The Norfolk golden whistler (P. p. xanthoprocta) declined for many years due to habitat loss and fragmentation and possibly also due to introduced predators such as the black rat. Most of the population is now restricted to the Norfolk Island National Park. This has resulted in it being listed as vulnerable by the Australian Government. Another island subspecies, the Lord Howe golden whistler (P. p. contempta) remains common, but was listed as vulnerable by the Australian Government due to its small range. It is not listed anymore.

== Gallery ==
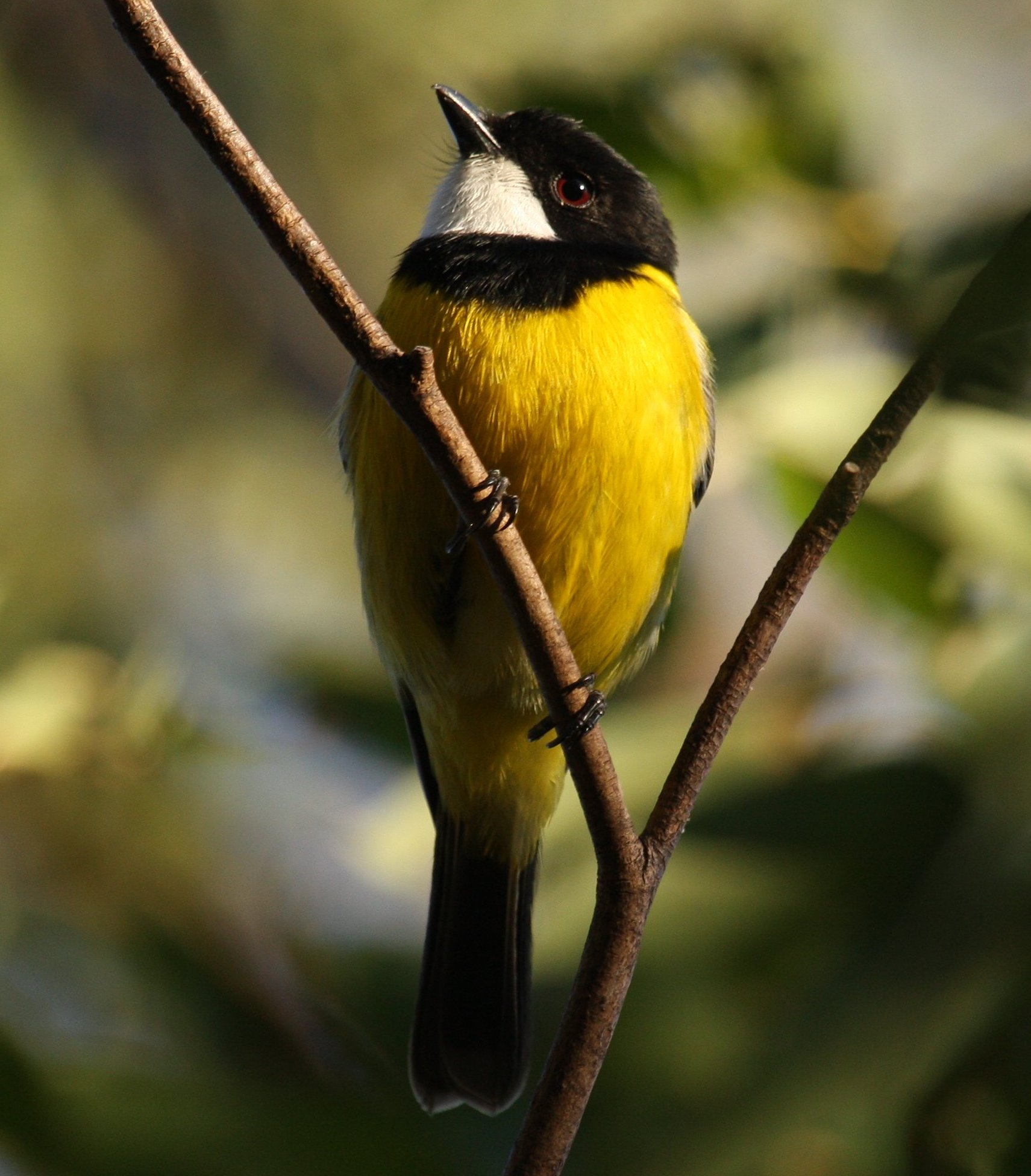
Male, Queensland, Australia

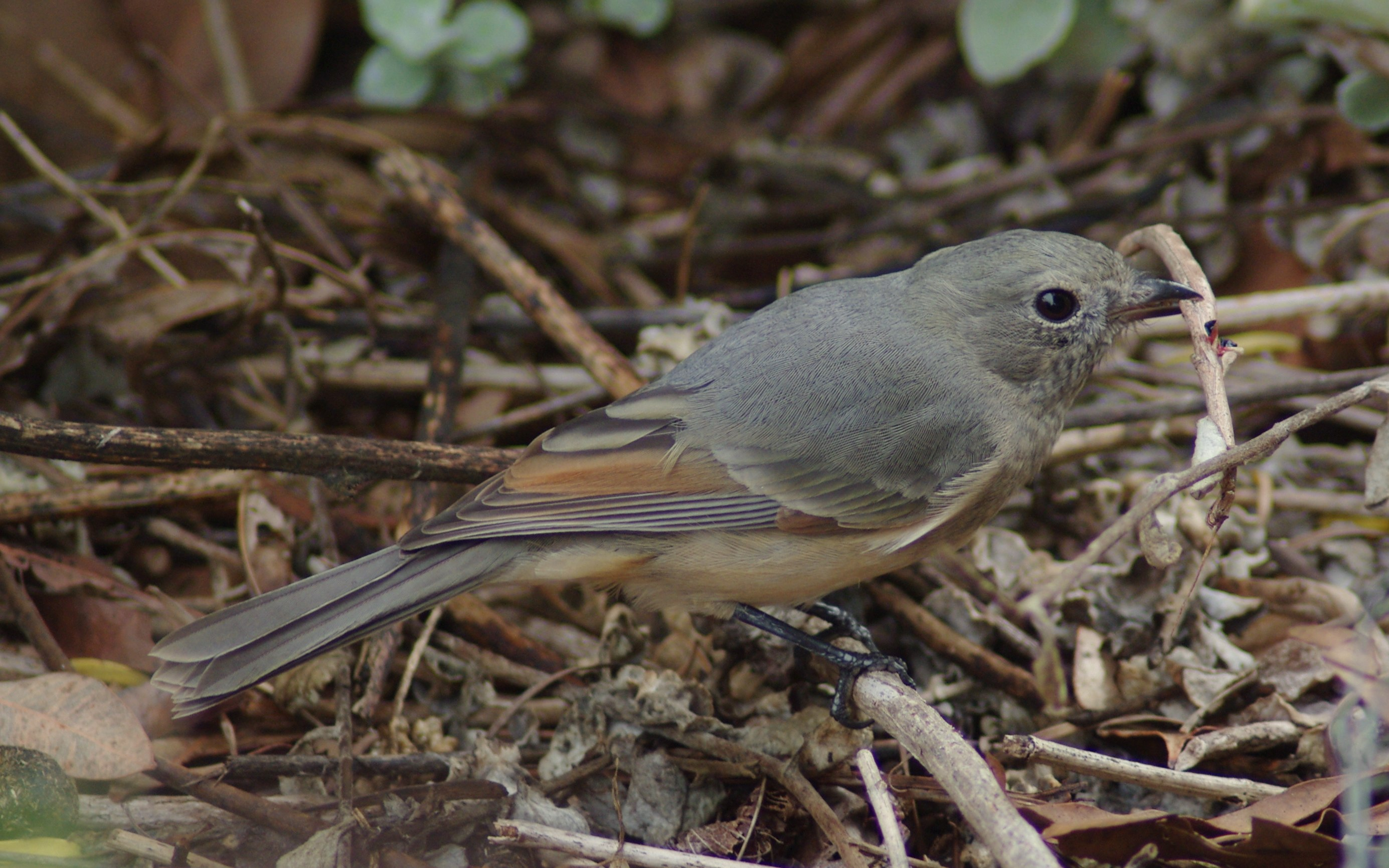
Juvenile

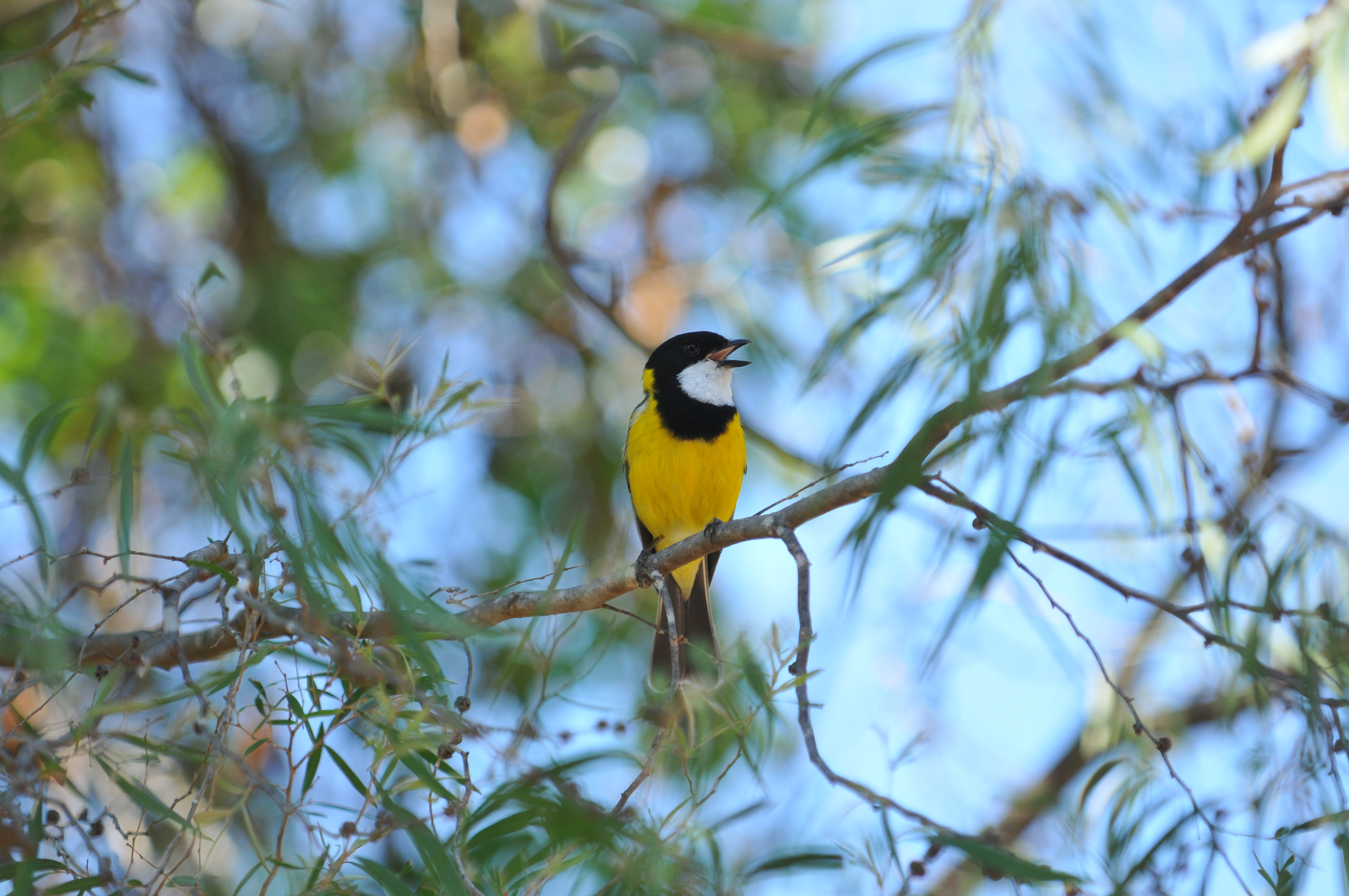
Male singing, Mallacoota, Australia

Song recorded in Mallacoota, Victoria, Australia

Meehan Range, Tasmania
