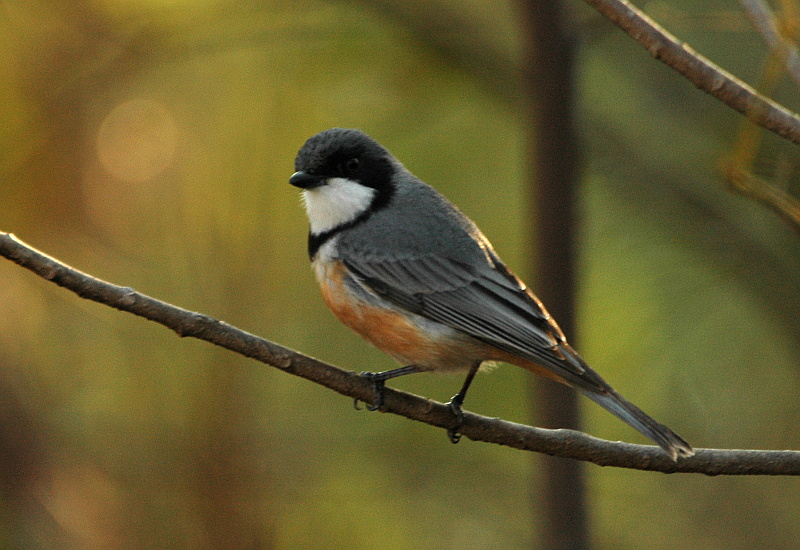
- Rufous whistler (Pachycephala rufiventris)

Scientific classification
- Kingdom: Animalia
- Phylum: Chordata
- Class: Aves
- Order: Passeriformes
- Superfamily: Orioloidea
- Family: Pachycephalidae; Swainson, 1832

Genera
- See text

= Pachycephalidae =

Family of birds

The Pachycephalidae (from Ancient Greek παχύς (pakhús), meaning "thick", and κεφαλή (kephalḗ), meaning "head") are a family of bird species that includes the whistlers, shrikethrushes, and three of the pitohuis, and is part of the ancient Australo-Papuan radiation of songbirds. The family includes 69 species that are separated into five genera. Its members range from small to medium in size, and occupy most of Australasia. Australia and New Guinea are the centre of their diversity and, in the case of the whistlers, the South Pacific islands as far as Tonga and Samoa and parts of Asia as far as India. The exact delimitation of boundaries of the family are uncertain, and one species, the golden whistler, has been the subject of intense taxonomic scrutiny in recent years, with multiple subspecies and species-level revisions.

== Taxonomy and systematics ==
The family Pachycephalidae was introduced (as the subfamily Pachycephalinae) by the English ornithologist William Swainson in 1832.

The genera Pachycare, Hylocitrea, the crested bellbird and the crested shriketit were previously included in the family Pachycephalidae until moved to the families Acanthizidae, Hylocitreidae and Oreoicidae and Falcunculidae respectively. Some authorities have also placed the genus Mohoua, classified in the monotypic family Mohouidae, within the family Pachycephalidae.

The whistler family has five extant genera as follows:

- Pseudorectes – 2 species
- Colluricincla – 11 species
- Melanorectes – black pitohui
- Coracornis – 2 species
- Pachycephala – typical whistlers (51 species)

The genus level phylogeny of the family Pachycephalidae shown below is based a study by Serina Brady and collaborators published in 2021. The species numbers are from the AviList taxonomy.

- Pachycephalidae
  - - Pseudorectes – pitohuis (2 species)
    - Colluricincla – strikethrushes (5 species)
  - - Melanorectes – black pitohui
    - - Coracornis – whistler and strikethrush (2 species)
      - Pachycephala – typical whistlers (51 species)

== Description ==
The whistlers are stout birds with strong bills, and the group was once known as the thickheads due to the large rounded heads of many species. Their plumage is rufous, brown, or grey in the majority of species. Nevertheless, a few species, particularly the golden whistler and its close relatives, have bright plumage. One of the more unusual traits of this family is found in the feathers of some of the pitohuis, which have toxins. These toxins are probably a deterrent to parasites and may also serve to dissuade predators from taking the birds.

=== Vocalisations ===
Several species belonging to this family are songsters: the whistlers produce a high volume for their size, and the lyrebirds aside, the grey shrikethrush is often regarded as the most inventive songbird of them all.

== Distribution and habitat ==
The whistlers are birds of forests and wooded areas. Most species inhabit rainforest, particularly in the Asian and Papuan parts of their range, but Australian species inhabit a wider range of habitats including woodlands, arid scrubland and mangrove forests. Some species are restricted to a particular ecosystem, whereas others are more catholic and will inhabit a range of habitat types.

== Behaviour and ecology ==
=== Breeding ===
Little is known about the breeding biology of most of the family; what is known generally comes from a small number of Australian species and the three New Zealand Mohoua species. They are monogamous and generally nest as simple pairs, although breeding groups have been recorded in some species.

=== Food and feeding ===
They are insectivorous, picking insects off leaves, branches, or leaf litter. While insects make up the majority of the diet they will also feed on spiders, worms, centipedes, snails, and small crabs; larger species will also tackle small vertebrates such as frogs, geckos and baby birds. They are generally sedate foragers and do not engage in hawking to obtain prey, instead being gleaners and probers. Only a few species migrate, most remaining resident in their tropical environment.
