= Bellbird =

Bellbird may refer to:

== Birds ==
- Neotropical bellbird (genus Procnias), of South and Central America
  - Bare-throated bellbird (Procnias nudicollis), eastern South America
  - Bearded bellbird (Procnias averano), north-eastern South America
  - Three-wattled bellbird (Procnias tricarunculatus), Central America
  - White bellbird (Procnias albus), northern South America
- Australasian bellbird (family Oreoicidae)
  - Crested bellbird (Oreoica gutturalis), of Australia
  - New Zealand bellbird (Anthornis melanura)
  - Piping bellbird (Ornorectes cristatus), also known as the crested pitohui
- Bell miner (Manorina melanophrys), colloquially known in Australia as the bellbird

== Other uses ==
- Bellbird, New South Wales, Australia
- Bellbird (TV series), a 1967-1977 Australian TV production
- Bellbird (film), a 2019 New Zealand film by director Hamish Bennett
