= Jaguaricatu River Canyon =

Canyon in Paraná, Brazil

The Jaguaricatu River Canyon (Portuguese: Cânion do Rio Jaguaricatu) is a canyon in Sengés, Paraná, Brazil.

== See also ==
- Jaguaricatu River
- Jaguariaíva River Canyon
