= Igreja Velha Canyon =

Canyon in Paraná, Brazil

Geography
- Location: Paraná, Brazil

The Igreja Velha Canyon (Portuguese: Cânion da Igreja Velha) is a canyon in Tibagi, Paraná, Brazil.

The Igreja Velha Canyon is located in the Second Plateau of Paraná, within the Devonian Escarpment Environmental Protection Area, about 20 kilometers from the city of Tibagi. With approximately 10 kilometers in length and elevations ranging from 700 to 1,200 meters above sea level, it is known for its rocky cliffs, native Campos Gerais vegetation, and natural attractions such as the Paraíso Waterfall, which is used for canyoning and rappelling. The region also features highland fields, small caves, sandstone formations, and ancient rock paintings.
