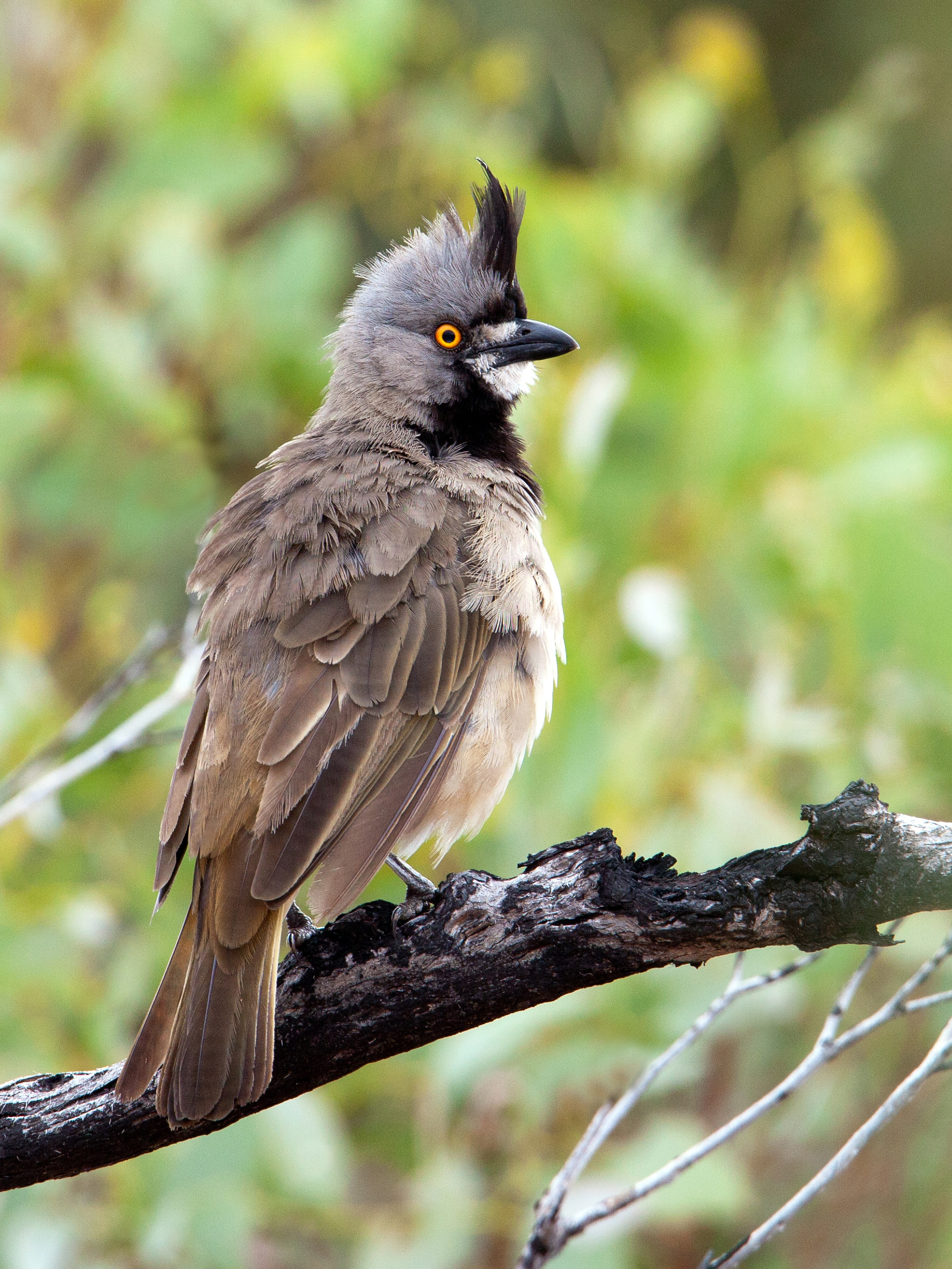
- Male crested bellbird
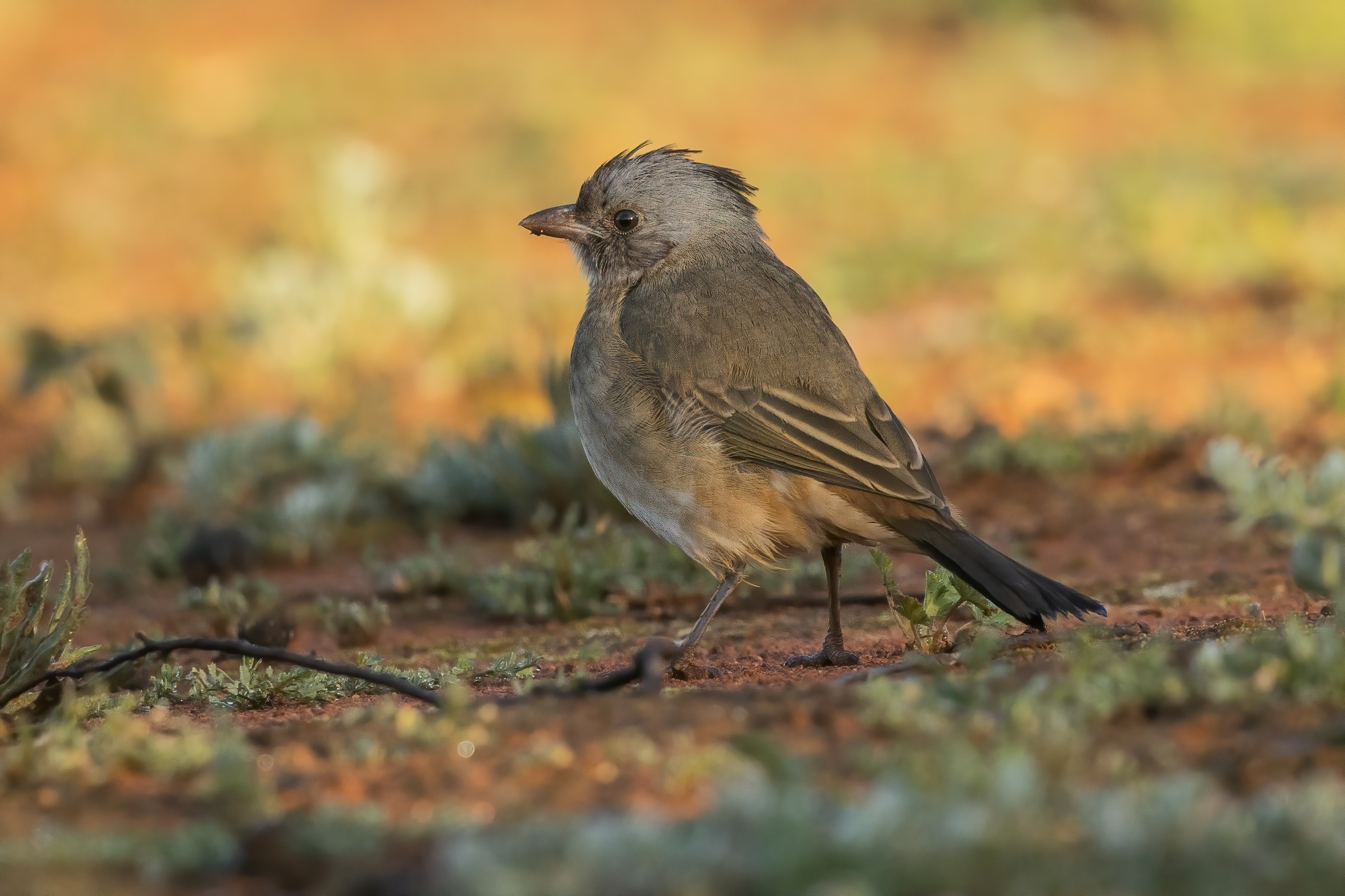
- Female crested bellbird

Conservation status
- Least Concern (IUCN 3.1)

Scientific classification
- Kingdom: Animalia
- Phylum: Chordata
- Class: Aves
- Order: Passeriformes
- Family: Oreoicidae
- Genus: Oreoica; Gould, 1838
- Species: O. gutturalis

Binomial name
- Oreoica gutturalis (Vigors & Horsfield, 1827)

= Crested bellbird =

Species of bird

St George, SW Queensland

The crested bellbird (Oreoica gutturalis) is a medium-sized passerine bird in the family Oreoicidae. It is native to drier parts of Australia where its typical habitats are acacia scrublands, eucalypt woodlands, spinifex and saltbush plains, and dunes. The male is about 20 cm (8 in) long and has a grey head, a black crest and breast, and a grey or olive brown body. The female and juvenile are similar but the colours are more muted and the black breast is lacking. The distinctive call is a high pitched bell-like sound, audible at some distance. Sometimes a pair of birds duet.

The crested bellbird feeds on seeds and small invertebrates, foraging on the ground or in low bushes. The deep, cup-shaped nest is usually within a couple of metres of the ground, built in the fork of a branch or in a crevice in a stump. It is made from small twigs and bark and lined with finer material. Up to four eggs are laid and these are incubated by both parents. Overall this bird is quite common, but in some regions, such as Victoria, it is threatened by fragmentation of its habitat

== Taxonomy and etymology ==
This bird has been placed in the Old World warbler family Sylviidae, at the time a "wastebasket taxon" used for birds of which the exact affinities are unknown, and, more recently, the whistler family Pachycephalidae, itself formerly a wastebasket taxon. It is now placed in the family Oreoicidae, along with two New Guinean species; the rufous-naped and piping bellbirds.

The Yuwaalaraay-Gamilaraay name banbandhuluwi; Wangaaybuwan name papampula; Pitjantjatjara name panpanpalala; Warlpiri name panpanpalala; and Nyungar names bokonbokon, barkabark, and dirldirl are reflective of its cowbell-like voice, as are the early European names dick-dick-the-devil and wack-to-the-rottle.

== Description ==
Adults range in size from 19 cm to 23 cm in length. Adult males have grey heads with a raised black crest, a white forehead and throat, and a prominent black breast, while the rest of the body is grey or brown. Females and immature birds are less prominently coloured than the males, lacking the black breast and having a smaller, unraised black crest. Both males and females have orange-red eyes. Similar species include wedgebills and the Western whipbird, which female and juvenile bellbirds resemble.

== Behaviour ==
=== Breeding ===
The crested bellbird forms pairs during breeding season and prepares deep cup-shaped nests made of fine sticks and twigs or bark, and lined with fine bark, fibres, or leaves. Nests are prepared in various places such as forks in dead trees, hollow stumps, etc., usually below two metres in height. The eggs are incubated by both sexes. The breeding season is variable but usually ranges from August till December with clutch sizes ranging from one to four eggs. The eggs are white or tinged with blue, and lightly blotched with dark brown and grey.

An interesting aspect of the nest-making process is that the bird places caterpillars of various species in and around its nest. It will nip the necks of the caterpillars to immobilise them, and it is theorised that the hairy caterpillars are either gathered as a cache of fresh food for parents and nestlings, or as a defensive barrier for their young.

=== Feeding ===
Crested bellbirds feed on invertebrates and seeds. They hop rapidly, foraging on the ground or flying low between low shrubs or into low branches of trees. They are usually solitary foragers but may feed in pairs during breeding season or in mixed feeding flocks with chestnut-rumped thornbills and red-capped robins.

=== Voice ===
The crested bellbird has a distinctive call. It has a high pitched bell-like call, with two slow notes then three fast notes, sounding like did-did-did-dit. The call can also sound like water drops – dee-dee-dee-ook or plonk-plon-plonka. Male birds sing from an exposed perch such as a dead branch or the top of a tree. Often duetting can be heard, where the male says tik-tik-tik and the female responds with a bell like tonk-tonk. Although the bird keeps a low profile, as many people have never seen it, the male call can unmistakably be heard from over half a kilometre away. Another aspect of the bellbird's call is its ventriloquial quality. This can make it very hard to identify the location of the calling bird as at first it can sound as if the call was coming from a few metres to the left, then to the right, and then from behind.

== Distribution and habitat ==
The crested bellbird's habitat is usually found throughout the semi-arid coastlines and towards the drier interior areas of Australia, particularly in areas dominated by acacia scrublands, eucalypt woodlands, spinifex and chenopod (saltbush) plains or dunes. The species is sedentary or locally nomadic and is distributed throughout most of the continent including west of the Great Dividing Range, in the south of tropical northern Australia, and through South Australia to the west coast of Western Australia. The bellbird avoids the far north and the humid eastern and extreme south-western regions.

== Status and conservation ==
The range of the crested bellbird has been contracted due to habitat destruction from land clearance, as this species is particularly susceptible to fragmentation. In Victoria, it has disappeared from well over half of its historical range.

Crested bellbirds are not listed as threatened on the Australian Environment Protection and Biodiversity Conservation Act 1999. However, their conservation status varies from state to state within Australia. For example:

- The crested bellbird is listed as threatened on the Victorian Flora and Fauna Guarantee Act (1988). Under this Act, an Action Statement for the recovery and future management of this species has not yet been prepared.
- On the 2007 advisory list of threatened vertebrate fauna in Victoria, the crested bellbird is listed as near threatened.
