= Jaguariaíva River Canyon =

Canyon in Paraná, Brazil

Coordinates: 24.161764°S 49.651770°W

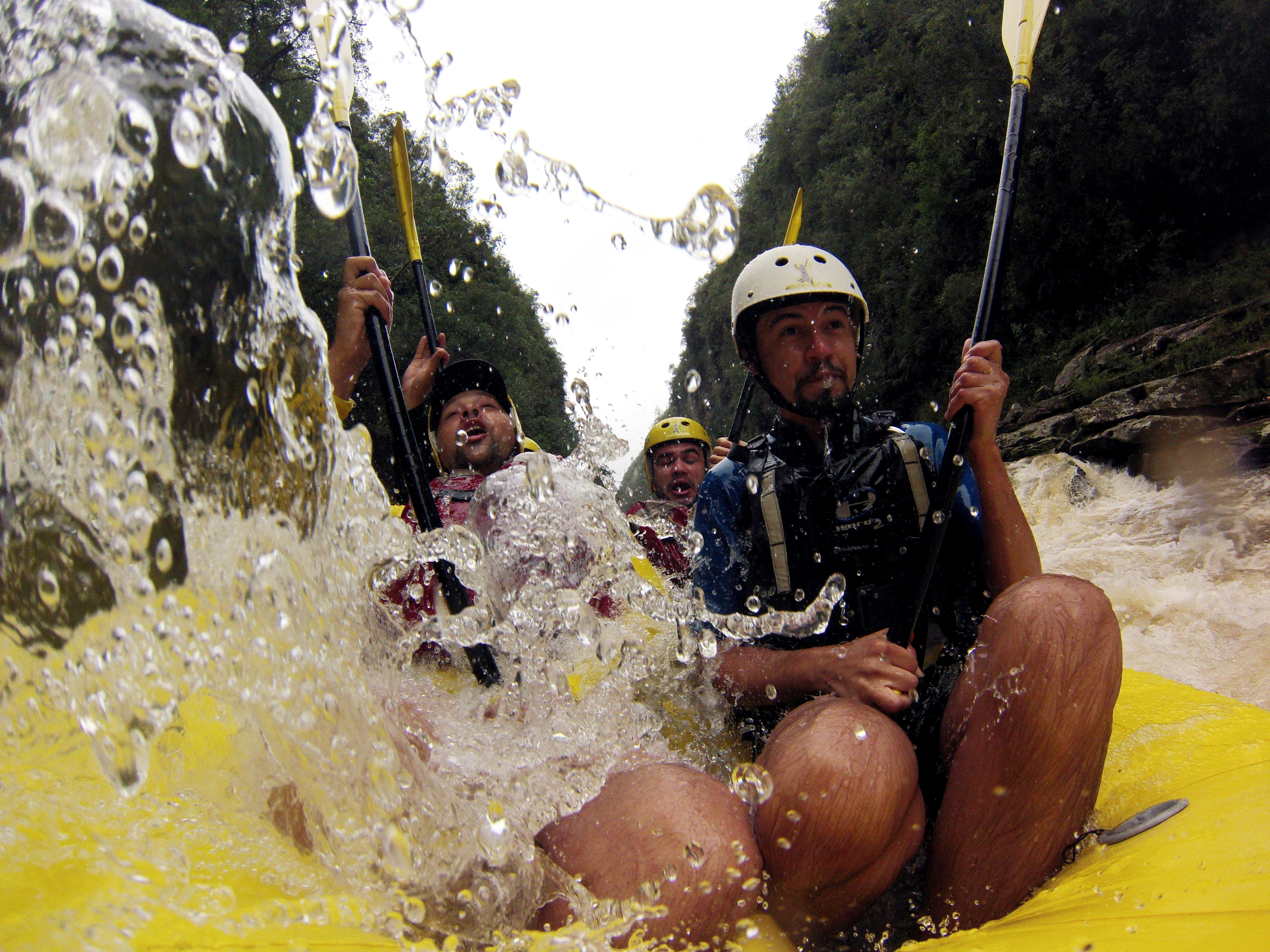
Rafters in the canyon

The Jaguariaíva River Canyon (Portuguese: Cânion do Rio Jaguariaíva) is a canyon in Jaguariaíva, Paraná, Brazil. The Jaguariaíva River flows through the canyon. The canyon is the 8th longest canyon in the world. Part of the canyon is protected by the 1,830 hectares (4,500 acres) Cerrado State Park, created in 1992.
