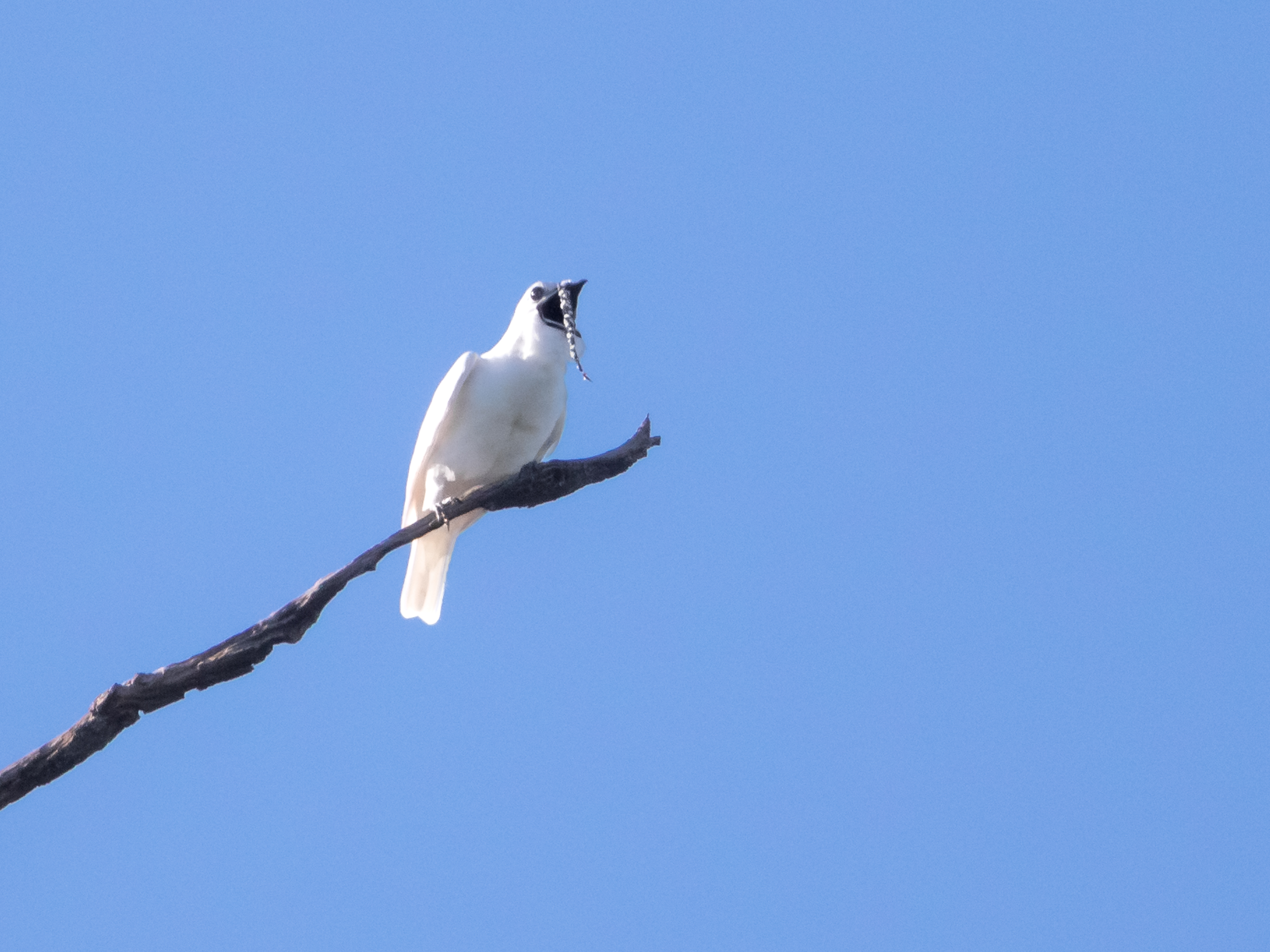
- Male at Carajás National Forest, State of Pará, Brazil.

Conservation status
- Least Concern (IUCN 3.1)

Scientific classification
- Kingdom: Animalia
- Phylum: Chordata
- Class: Aves
- Order: Passeriformes
- Family: Cotingidae
- Genus: Procnias
- Species: P. albus

Binomial name
- Procnias albus (Hermann, 1783)
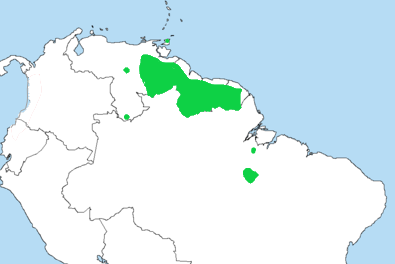
- Range of P. albus

= White bellbird =

Species of bird

The white bellbird (Procnias albus) is a species of bird in the family Cotingidae, the cotingas. It is found in Brazil, French Guiana, Guyana, Suriname, Venezuela, and as a vagrant to Trinidad.

== Taxonomy and systematics ==
The white bellbird has two subspecies, the nominate P. a. albus (Hermann, 1783) and P. a. wallacei (Oren & Novaes, 1985). It shares genus Procnias with three other species; it and the three-wattled bellbird (P. tricarunculatus) are sister species.

The species' specific epithet has often been spelled alba, but albus is correct due to the masculine gender of Procnias.

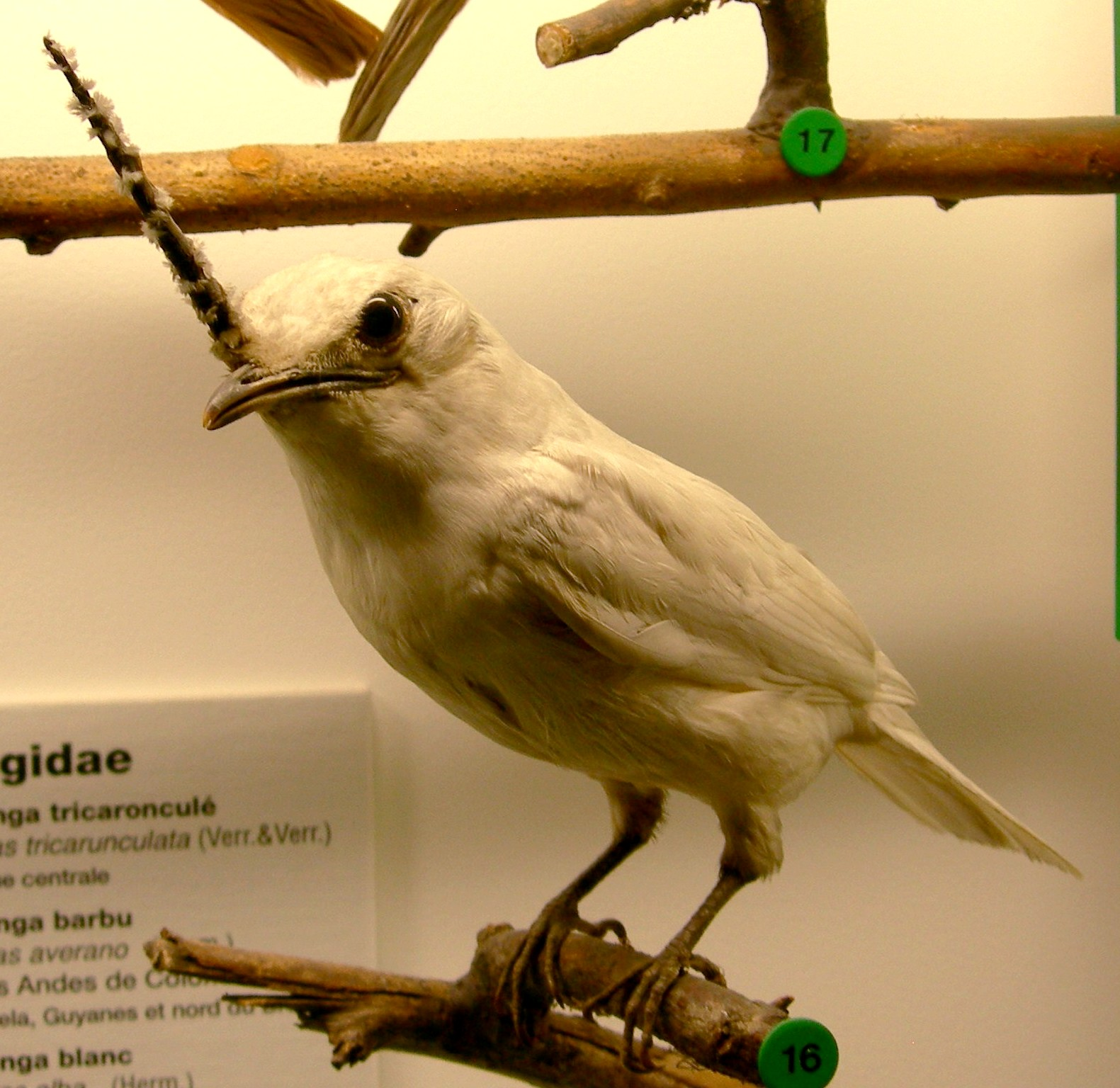
A taxidermied male, with the wattle incorrectly positioned as being raised rather than hanging down

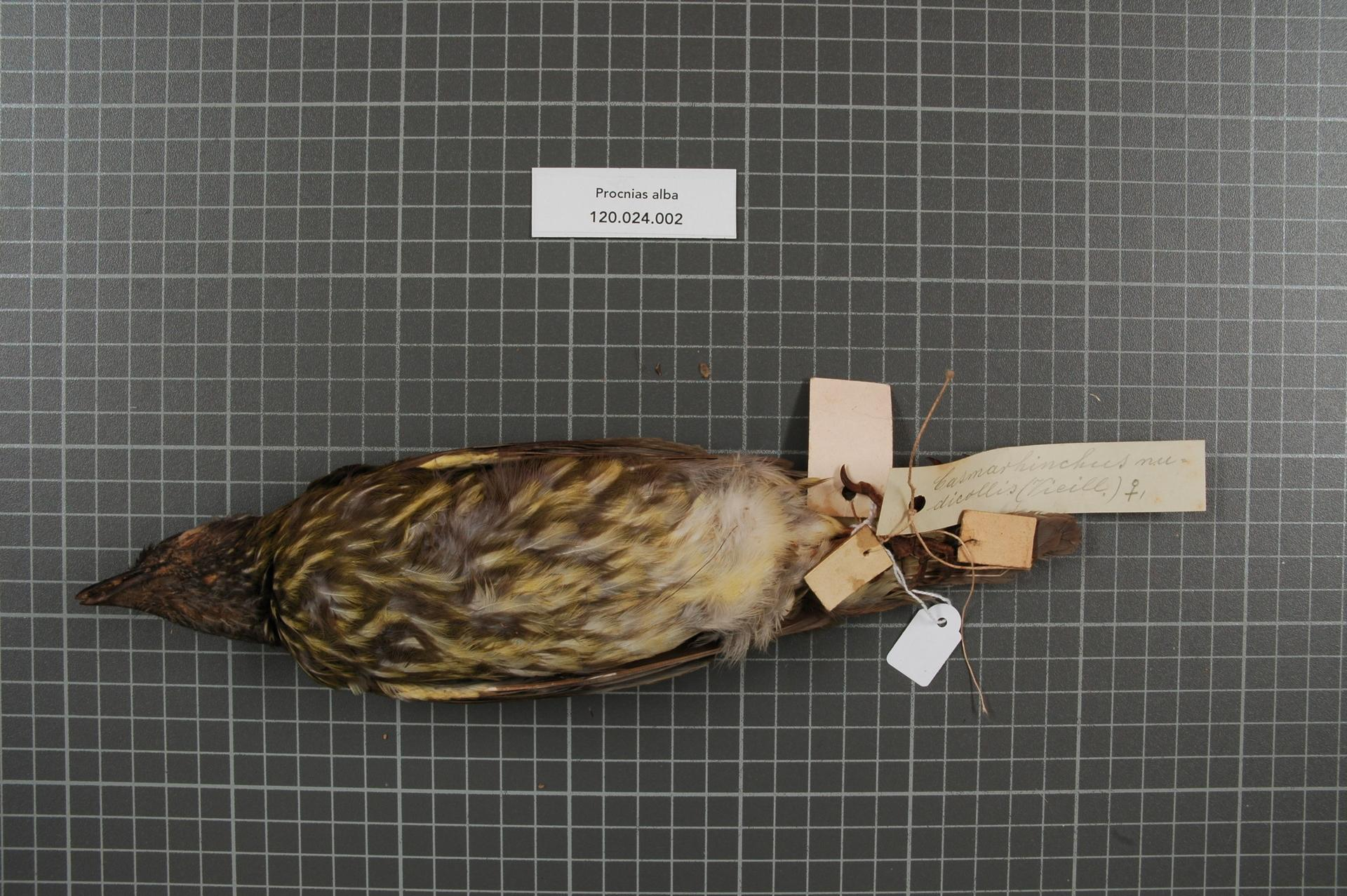
A preserved specimen of a female white bellbird

== Description ==
The white bellbird is about 27 to 29 cm (11 to 11 in) long; males weigh 210 to 222 g (7.4 to 7.8 oz). The species is dramatically sexually dimorphic though both sexes have a short bill that opens very wide. Males are unique. Females resemble female bearded bellbirds (P. averano). Adult males of the nominate subspecies have entirely white plumage. They have a single black wattle with a few white feathers that drapes from the base of the maxilla. Females do not have a wattle. Adult females have an olive-green head and upperparts. Their wings and tail are also olive-green with somewhat duskier primaries and their coverts. Their underparts are yellow with olive streaks. Both sexes have a blackish iris, a black bill with pale cutting edges, and dark gray legs and feet. Immature birds resemble females, and males take a year or more to attain white plumage and the wattle. Subspecies P. a. wallacei has a longer and thinner bill than the nominate and its throat has a slight gray tinge.

== Distribution and habitat ==
The white bellbird has a disjunct distribution. The nominate subspecies has by far the larger range of the two. It is found from eastern Bolívar state in eastern Venezuela east across the Guianas and at scattered locations across the northern parts of Brazil's Roraima and Pará states. A small population is also on Cerro de la Neblina in the far south of Venezuela's Amazonas state. Subspecies P. a. wallacei is found in the Serra dos Carajás in southeastern Pará. The nominate subspecies has also occurred as a vagrant on Trinidad.

The white bellbird inhabits humid forest, mostly in the lowlands but also on the slopes of tepuis in Venezuela. In elevation it ranges between 450 and 1,100 m (1,500 and 3,600 ft) in Venezuela and from near sea level to 1,250 m (4,100 ft) in Brazil.

== Behavior ==
=== Movement ===
The white bellbird appears to be partially migratory though details are poorly defined. The nominate subspecies makes some elevational movements between the breeding and non-breeding seasons. The species also wanders, with isolated records outside its core range.

=== Feeding ===
The white bellbird apparently feeds only on fruit. It sometimes plucks it while perched but more often during a sally from a perch. The fruit is swallowed whole and seeds are regurgitated.

=== Breeding ===
The nesting behavior of the white bellbird is not well defined. Its breeding season appears to span from February to June. A study published in 1973 posited that its behavior is very similar to that of the bearded bellbird. Males of that species are sedentary, marking their territory throughout the year except when molting by calling from exposed perches, often above the canopy. Females join males to mate and alone tend the nest. One source states that a sparse nest is built on open branches and that the clutch is one or two eggs. Male white bellbirds display from treetops. They call with a horizontal posture, with the wattle inflated, and either hold still or lean right and left as they call.

=== Vocalization ===
The white bellbird is believed to be the world's loudest bird, with calls of up to 125 dB(A) (at equivalent 1m distance). The record was previously held by the screaming piha, which was recorded at 116 dB.

The white bellbird has two main vocalizations. One is "a loud kong-kay like two sharp blows on a cracked bell, given with the head held immobile". It varies this call with a swing to right for the first note and to the left for the second. The species' second call is "a more musical, droning duaaaaaaaaa...deeeeeee, almost hypnotic".

== Status ==
The IUCN has assessed the white bellbird as being of least concern. Its population size is not known and is believed to be decreasing. No immediate threats have been identified. It is considered "quite local" in Venezuela and rare in Brazil. It is overall "uncommon, thinly distributed and difficult to observe, although conspicuous and very locally common when singing. Populations in remote highlands of E & S Venezuela and the Guianas should remain little disturbed for foreseeable future."
