= Jaguariaíva River =

River in Brazil

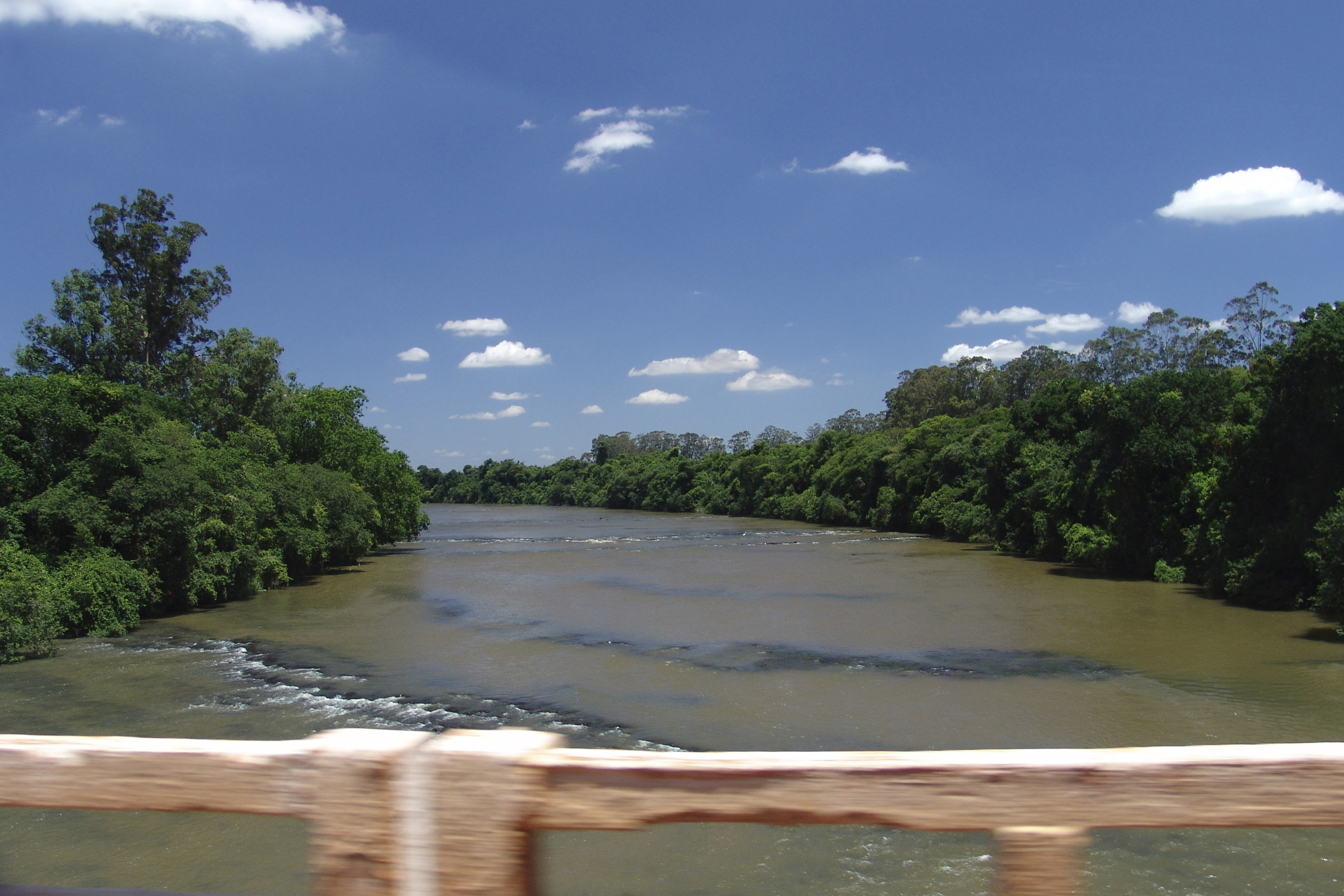

- Location within Brazil

Location
- Country: Brazil

Physical characteristics
- Source
  - location: Paraná state
- Mouth
  - coordinates: 23.928280°S 49.536929°W

Basin features
- River system: Itararé River

The Jaguariaíva River is a river of Paraná state in southern Brazil. It is a tributary of the Itararé River, which it joins on the border with the state of São Paulo.

Part of the Jaguariaíva River Canyon is protected by the 1,830 hectares (4,500 acres) Cerrado State Park, created in 1992.

== See also ==
- List of rivers of Paraná
