= Tibagi =

Coordinates: 24°30′S 50°24′W

- Municipality
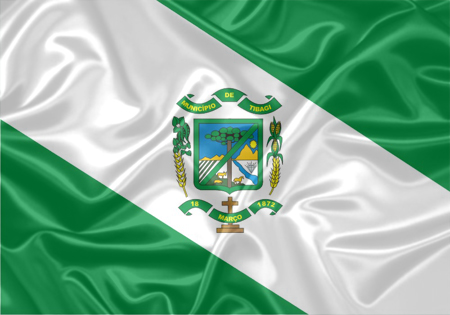
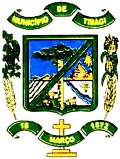
- Flag Coat of arms
- Interactive map of Tibagi
- Country: Brazil
- Region: Southern
- State: Paraná
- Mesoregion: Centro Oriental Paranaense

Population (2020)
  - Total: 20,607
- Time zone: UTC -3

Tibagi is a municipality in the state of Paraná in the Southern Region of Brazil.

Second largest municipality of Paraná in land, Tibagi expands over an area of over 200 square kilometres (77 sq mi). With the vast territory, its economy is based on agriculture and it is considered the largest wheat producer in Brazil and also stands out as one of the largest producers in the cultivation of grains such as corn, beans and soybeans.

Tourism is among the largest economic strengths, hosting a traditional Brazilian Carnival celebration, and geographic features including the Iapó River and the Guartelá Canyon -- considered to be the 6th largest canyon in the world -- alongside rivers, waterfalls, and hills. For these features Tibagi is a preferred destination for many extreme sports fans who like rafting, mountain climbing, parasailing and others.

Tibagi has humid subtropical climate (Köppen: Cfb), in colder months, it reaches 18°C, and a cool summer with the average temperature of the hottest month below 22°C.

The municipality contains the 799-hectare (1,970-acre) Guartelá State Park, created in 1992 to protect the scenic Guartelá Canyon of the Iapó River.

== See also ==
- List of municipalities in Paraná
