= União Latino-Americana de Tecnologia =

- Type: Private
- Established: December 30, 2002
- Location: Jaguariaíva, Paraná, Brazil
- Campus: Urban
- Website: ult.com.br

União Latino-Americana de Tecnologia (abbreviated ULT) is a Brazilian Higher Education institution, based in Jaguariaíva, Paraná (state). It was founded in 2002.
