= Guartelá Canyon =

Canyon in Paraná, Brazil

Coordinates: 24.5494°S 50.2694°W

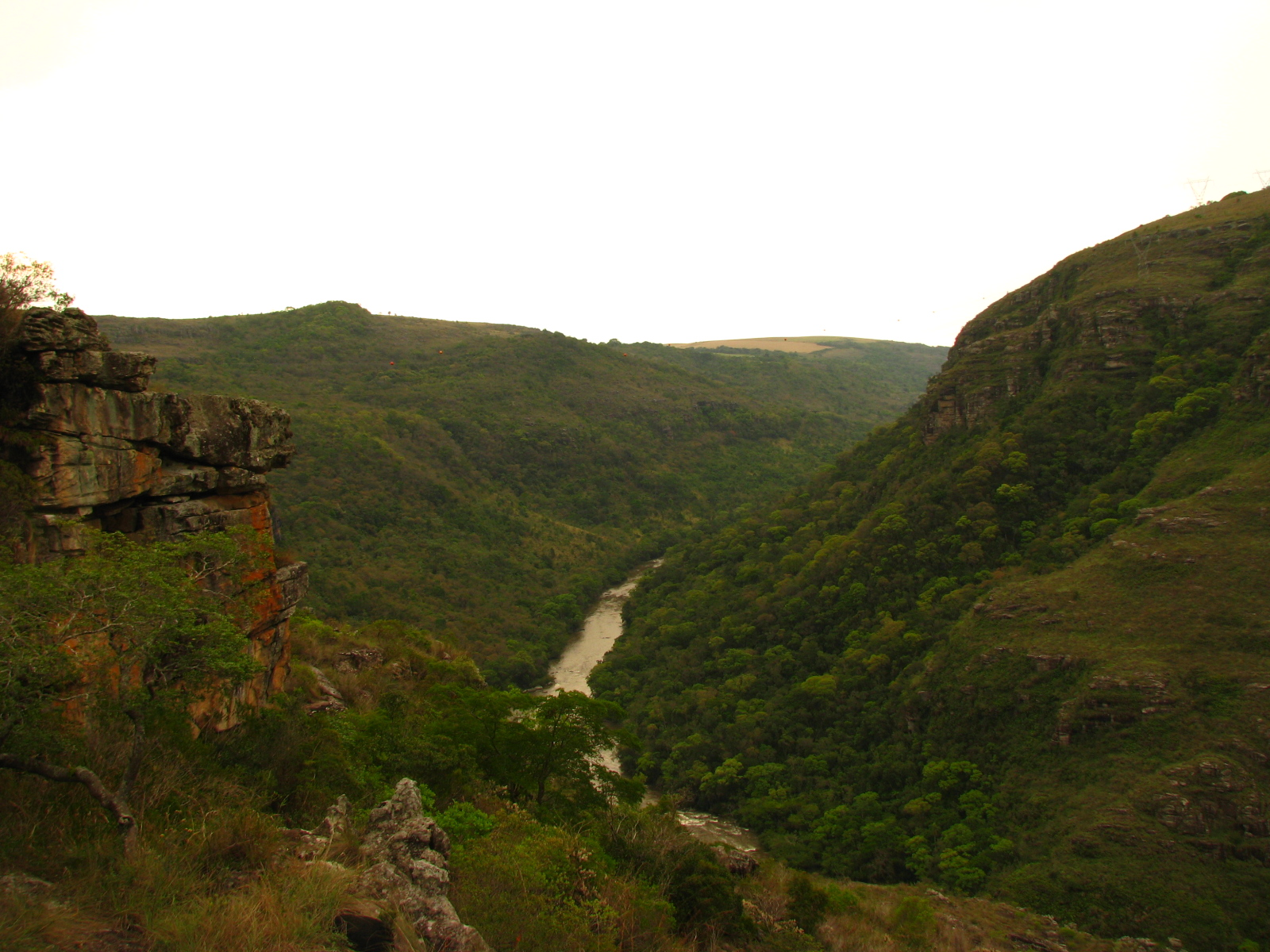

Geography
- Location: Paraná, Brazil
- Rivers: Iapó River
- Interactive map of Guartelá Canyon

The Guartelá Canyon (Portuguese: Cânion Guartelá) is a canyon in Tibagi and Castro, Paraná, Brazil. The canyon of the Iapó River is protected by the 799 hectares (1,970 acres) Guartelá State Park, created in 1992.
