= Cerrado State Park =

State park in Paraná, Brazil

- Parque Estadual do Cerrado
- IUCN category II (national park)
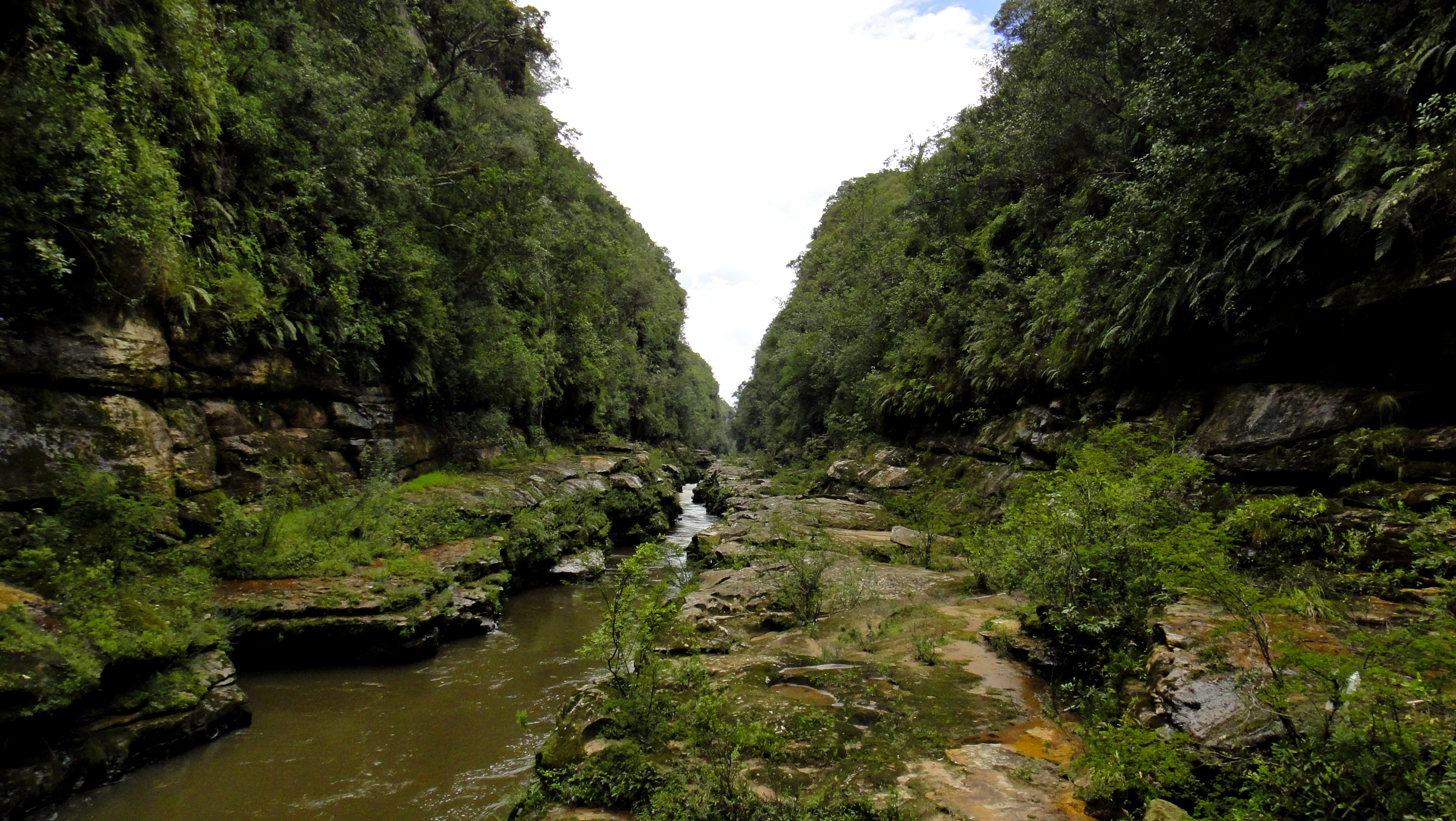
- Canyon of the Jaguariaíva River

- Location within Brazil
- Nearest city: Jaguariaíva, Paraná
- Coordinates: 24.165993°S 49.655201°W
- Area: 1,830.40 hectares (4,523.0 acres)
- Designation: State park
- Created: 27 March 1992
- Administrator: IAP: Instituto Ambiental do Paraná

The Cerrado State Park (Portuguese: Parque Estadual do Cerrado) is a state park in the state of Paraná, Brazil. It protects a river canyon and the surrounding cerrado fields.

== Location ==
The Cerrado State Park is in the municipalities of Jaguariaíva and Sengés in the state of Paraná. It is 12 kilometres (7.5 mi) from the municipal seat. It has an area of 1,830.40 hectares (4,523.0 acres). (Note: The official area given in the original decree was 420.40 hectares (1,038.8 acres), but SEMA determined from the map that it was in fact slightly smaller, at 413.32 hectares (1,021.3 acres). In the management plan, where different zones were defined their true areas were adjusted upward slightly so that they total 420.40 hectares.) When created it was bounded to the east by the Jaguariaíva River, to the north by the Santo Antônio Stream (Ribeirão Santo Antônio), and to the south and west by private properties. The terrain is from 800 to 900 metres (2,600 to 3,000 ft) above sea level, or 750 metres (2,460 ft) in the Jaguariaíva canyon.

== Environment ==
Soils in the park are mostly latosols, typically red latosol, with low natural fertility, The Köppen climate classification is Cfb, temperate and always humid. The warmest month has average temperatures below 22 °C (72 °F) and the rest of the year has average temperatures above 10 °C (50 °F). Frost occurs at most in five nights of the year. On average there are 129 rainy days and 236 dry days.

The vegetation of the northeast of Paraná, on the reverse of the Furnas escarpment, is a mosaic of forest fragments, grassland and cerrado. The region is in the transition between the cerrado of central Brazil and the seasonal semi-deciduous forest of the south and southeast of the country. It is at the northern limit of the southern grasslands. Different types of vegetation grow at different altitudes. Generally the grasslands are found in the higher regions with shallow and young soils, while cerrado or forest is found lower down where there are older and deeper soils. Human activities in the area have replaced much of the vegetation by monocultures. Remnants of the original vegetation have often been disturbed by fires, livestock or selective logging.

The Cerrado State Park holds one of the few protected areas of cerrado in the state. It has great diversity of flora in a small area, and has been much studied by researchers from the Federal University of Paraná and other institutions. The park holds important samples of the four main vegetation types of the region: forest, cerrado, prairie and rocky outcrop vegetation. The cerrado includes clean or rocky grassland, campo cerrado, cerrado strict sense and a very small area of cerradão. Forest includes forest in the transition to cerrado and ciliary forest along the watercourses.

== History ==
The area of the park was part of the family property of the wife of the mayor. Much of the cerrado in the area had been cleared to give way to pasture and crops, and this was true of adjacent areas such as the property on the other side of the river. It was common to burn the cerrado every two years to allow for cattle grazing, which had drastically changed the structure of the vegetation, and goats were also raised in the area. The Cerrado State Park was created by decree 1.232 of 27 March 1992 with an area of 420.40 hectares (1,038.8 acres) in the municipality of Jaguariaíva. It is managed by the Environmental Institute of Paraná (IAP). The objective is to preserve remnants of cerrado fields, typical and endangered ecosystems, and places of exceptional scenic beauty such as canyons and waterfalls.

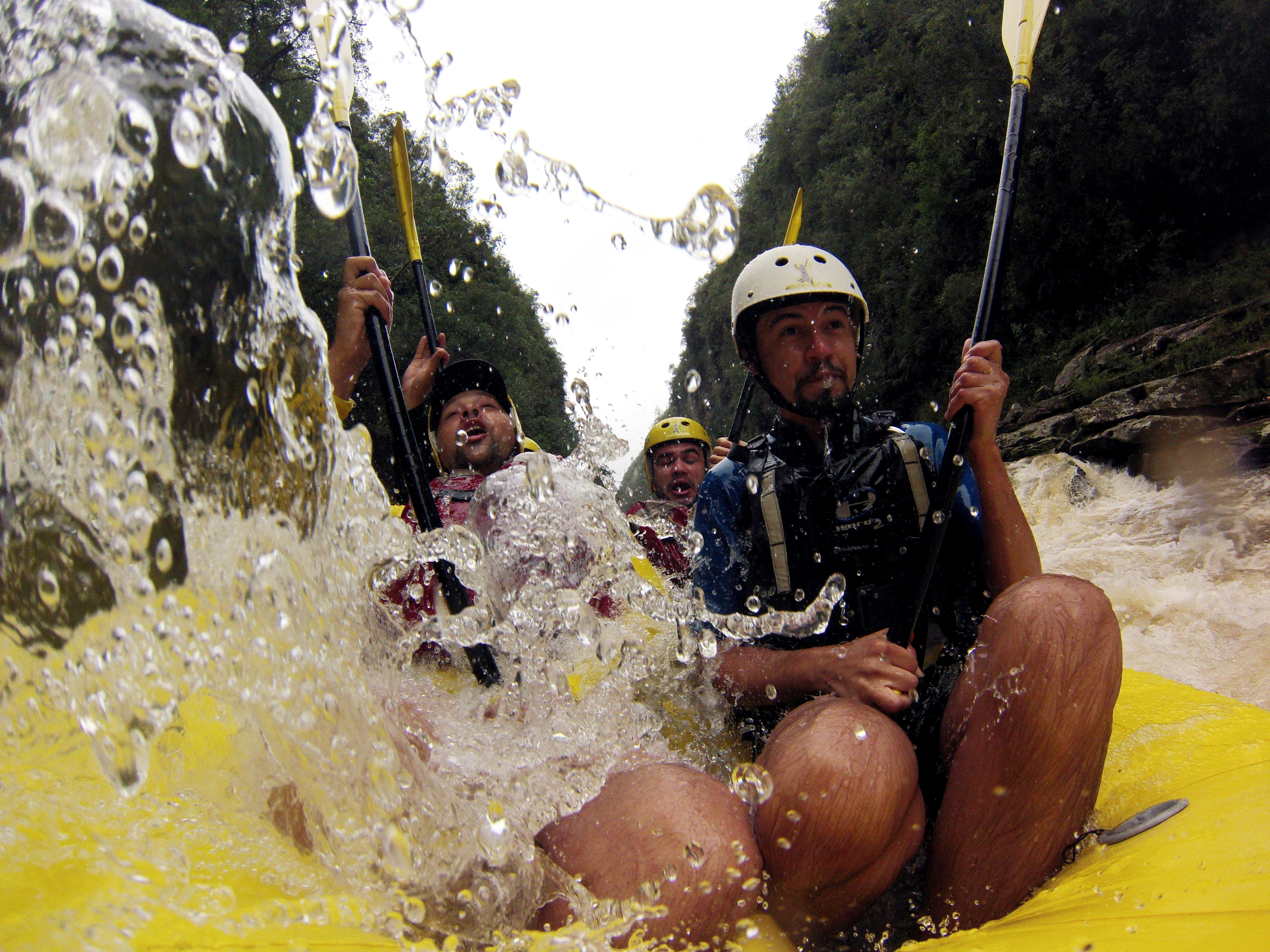
Rafters in the canyon

On 2 October 2007 Governor Roberto Requião signed a decree to expand the Cerrado State Park to 1,830.40 hectares (4,523.0 acres). He also expanded the Pico do Marumbi State Park to 8,745 hectares (21,610 acres) and created the Vale do Codó and Palmas state parks. The governor said laws were being drafted so the legislature could confirm these measures. In his first term of office he had created the Guartelá State Park by decree, and the governor who succeeded him had reduced it by 90% through a decree. This would not have been possible if laws had been passed. After the expansion, which would require expropriation of some land, the park would cover parts of the municipalities of Jaguariaíva and Sengés.

The IAP closed the park in 2010 for improvements, and reopened it a year later in November 2011. Exotic species had been eradicated, and the park had new lookouts, trails, a visitor center, research buildings, a park ranger house and an access bridge. Funding came from a private company in exchange for an environmental license to build a plywood factory in Jaguariaíva. As of 2011 the park was the only conservation unit in Paraná to use solar energy with photovoltaic panels and to treat its waste.

== Sources ==
- Linsingen, Leonardo von; Sonehara, Juliano de Souza; Uhlmann, Alexandre; Cervi, Armando (2006), "Composição florística do Parque Estadual do Cerrado de Jaguariaíva, Paraná, Brasil", Acta Biol. Par. (in Portuguese), 35 (3–4), Curitiba
- Parque Estadual do Cerrado, em Jaguariaíva, é reaberto (in Portuguese), IAP: Instituto Ambiental do Paraná, 24 November 2011
- "III Informações Gerais", Plano de Manejo Parque Estadual do Cerrado (PDF) (in Portuguese), Curitiba / PR: IAP:Instituto Ambiental do Paraná - IAP, December 2002, archived from the original (PDF) on 2016-12-20
- Requião cria dois novos parques estaduais e amplia áreas de Unidades de Conservação (in Portuguese), Secretaria de Estado da Comunicação Social - Paraná, 2 October 2007
