= Pico do Marumbi State Park =

State park in Paraná, Brazil

- Parque Estadual Pico do Marumbi
- IUCN category II (national park)
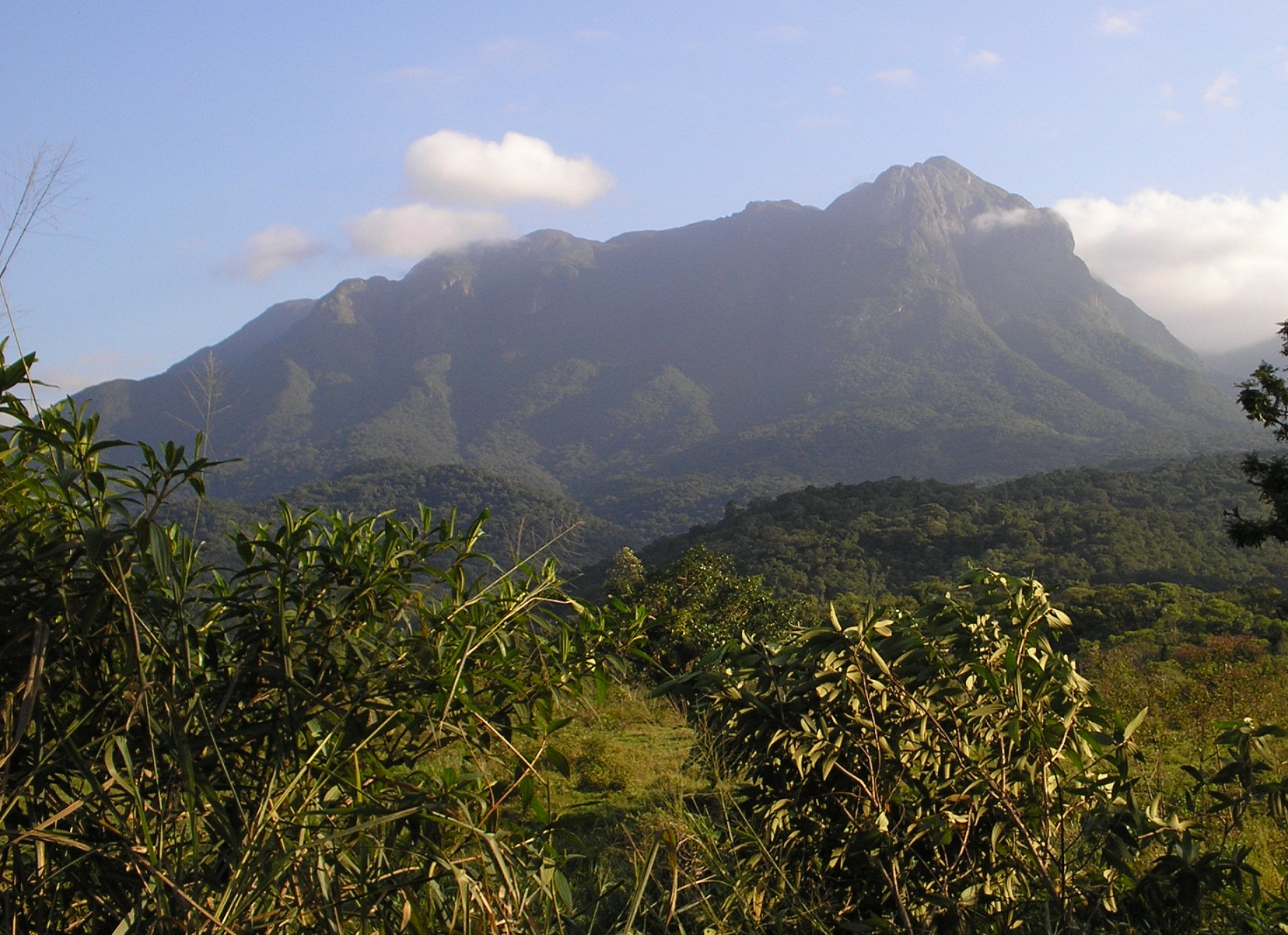
- Pico do Marumbi from Porto de Cima by Nhundiaquara River

- Location within Brazil
- Coordinates: 25.453611°S 48.919722°W
- Area: 8,745.45 hectares (21,610.5 acres)
- Designation: State park
- Created: 24 September 1990
- Administrator: Environmental Institute of Paraná (IAP)

The Pico do Marumbi State Park (Portuguese: Parque Estadual Pico do Marumbi) is a State park in the state of Paraná, Brazil.

== Location ==
The Pico do Marumbi State Park is in the municipality of Morretes, Paraná. It has an area of 8,745.45 hectares (21,610.5 acres). It may be reached from Curitiba by a 2-hour ride on the centennial Curitiba-Paranaguá railroad, which has a station at the park. Entrance is free. The climate is tropical, with an annual average temperature of 25 °C (77 °F). The region is very rainy, with driest conditions from April to October. The park has well-preserved forests. It is part of the Lagamar Mosaic.

== History ==
The Pico do Marumbi State Park was created by state governor decree 7300 of 24 September 1990 with an area of 2,342.41 hectares (5,788.2 acres). The Institute of Lands, Cartography and Forests (ITCF) of the State of Paraná was to administer the park to promote preserving the waters, flora and fauna. Two years were given for preparation of the management plan, to be integrated with the Marumbi Tourist Area.

On 2 October 2007 Governor Roberto Requião signed a decree to expand the Pico do Marumbi State Park to 8,745 hectares (21,610 acres). He also expanded the Cerrado State Park to 1,830.40 hectares (4,523.0 acres) and created the Vale do Codó and Palmas state parks. The governor said laws were being drafted so the legislature could confirm these measures. In his first term of office he had created the Guartelá State Park by decree, and the governor who succeeded him had reduced it by 90% through a decree. This would not have been possible if laws had been passed. The park remained under the administration of the Environmental Institute of Paraná (IAP). The decree declared that land within the new boundaries were of public utility, and would be expropriated with compensation.

== Mountains ==
The Marumbi Massif is located inside the state park, a complex with eight peaks with varying degrees of difficulty. The massif is in the heart of the Serra do Mar of Paraná. The mountains can be challenging, and it is best to employ an experienced guide. Olimpo is the highest, at 1,539 metres (5,049 ft), and was first climbed by Joaquim Olímpio de Miranda on 21 August 1879. The seven other peaks are Boa Vista at 1,500 metres (4,900 ft), Gigante at 1,487 metres (4,879 ft), Ponta do Tigre at 1,400 metres (4,600 ft), Esfinge at 1,378 metres (4,521 ft), Torre dos Sinos at 1,280 metres (4,200 ft), Abrolhos at 1,200 metres (3,900 ft) and Facãozinho at 1,100 metres (3,600 ft).

== Other attractions ==
An easy 30 minute walk from the park base leads to the Rochedinho, at 630 metres (2,070 ft) above sea level. This gives a view over the Paranaguá and Antonina bays and the Serra do Mar. The Marumbinistas Waterfall is a 50-metre (160 ft) fall on the Taquaral River, which has several natural pools where visitors can bathe. The park has a free camping area beside the forest police post, with toilets and hot water showers. There is a museum with pictures, artifacts and maps about the conquest of the peak.

== Sources ==
- Dias, Álvaro; Dias, Osmar Fernandes; Souza, Paulo Roberto Pereira de (24 September 1990), Decreto 7300 - 24 de Setembro de 1990 (in Portuguese), State of Paraná
- "Parque Estadual Pico do Marumbi", Guia da Semana (in Portuguese), 6 September 2011
- "Parque Estadual do Marumbi", Trilhas e Rumos (in Portuguese)
- "Pico do Marumbi – uma conquista à altura de todos", Tribuna/PR (in Portuguese), 10 December 2008
- Requião, Roberto; Rodrigues, Lindsley da Silva Rasca; Verri, Enio José (2 October 2007), Decreto 1531 - 02 de Outubro de 2007 (in Portuguese), State of Paraná
- Requião cria dois novos parques estaduais e amplia áreas de Unidades de Conservação (in Portuguese), Secretaria de Estado da Comunicação Social - Paraná, 2 October 2007
- Unidades de Conservação - Mosaico do Litoral Sul de São Paulo e do Litoral do Paraná - LAGAMAR (in Portuguese), ICMBio, archived from the original on 2019-05-27
