= Jaguaricatu River =

River in Brazil

Location
- Country: Brazil

Physical characteristics
- Source
  - location: Paraná state
- Mouth: Itararé River
  - coordinates: 24°7′S 49°28′W

The Jaguaricatu River is a river of Paraná state in southern Brazil.

== See also ==
- Jaguaricatu River Canyon
- List of rivers of Paraná
