= Iapó River =

River in Brazil

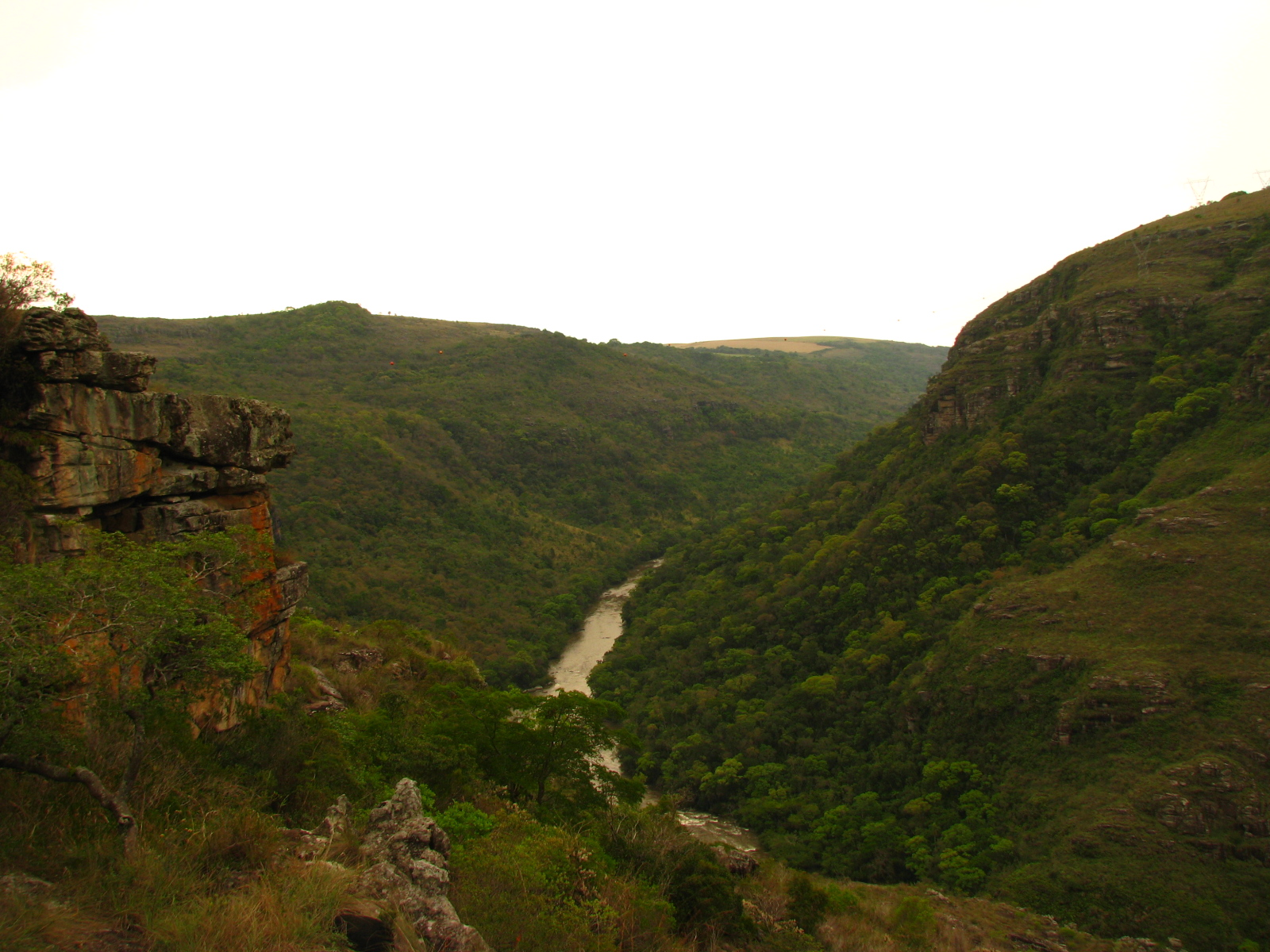
- Iapó River in Guartelá Canyon

- Location within Brazil
- Native name: Rio Iapó (Portuguese)

Location
- Country: Brazil

Physical characteristics
- Source
  - location: Paraná state
- Mouth
  - coordinates: 24.502860°S 50.411475°W

Basin features
- River system: Tibagi River

The Iapó River (Portuguese: Rio Iapó) is a river of Paraná state in southern Brazil. It is a tributary of the Tibagi River.

The river is known for the scenic Guartelá Canyon, which is protected by the 799 hectares (1,970 acres) Guartelá State Park, created in 1992.

== See also ==
- List of rivers of Paraná
