= Jaguariaíva =

Coordinates: 24°15′S 49°42′W

- Municipality
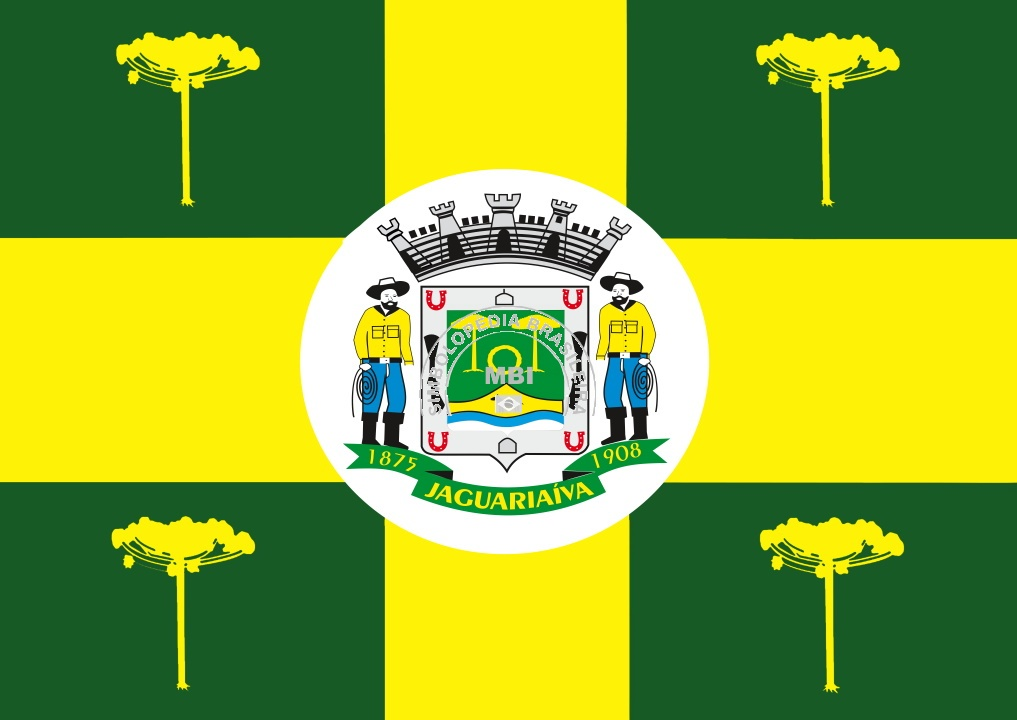
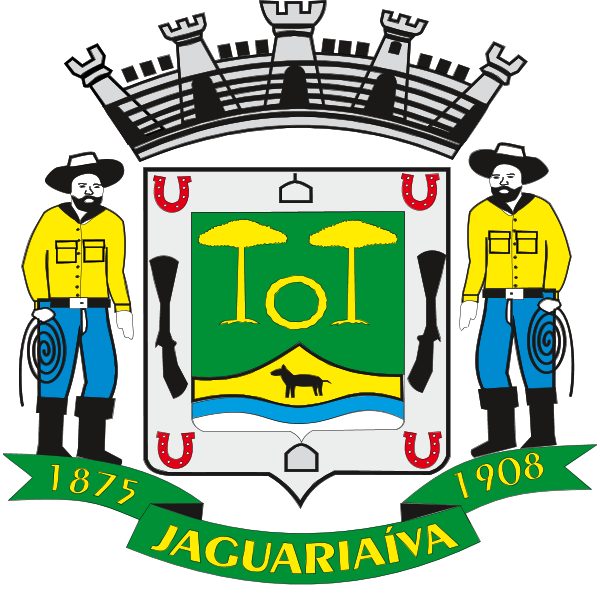
- Flag Seal

- Location in Paraná
- Country: Brazil
- Region: Southern
- State: Paraná
- Mesoregion: Centro Oriental Paranaense

Government
  - Mayor: José Sloboda (PL)
  - Deputy Mayor: Reginaldo Cheirubim (PSD)

Population (2020)
  - Total: 35,027
- Time zone: UTC -3
- Postal code: 84200-000
- Area code: +55 43

Jaguariaíva is a municipality in the state of Paraná in the Southern Region of Brazil.

The municipality of Jaguariaíva is located at 24°15'04 S and 49°42'21 W with an area of 1,453 km² (561 mi²). The municipality began as an overnight resting point for muleteers troops in the late Seventeenth century. Since then, It has undergone a forestry and pulp industry boom throughout the Twentieth Century. Consequently, modern-day Jaguariaíva supplies the Brazilian and international markets with resin, cheap wood for construction, plywood, paper pulp, and lightweight coated and newsprint papers.

The municipality contains part of the 1,830 hectares (4,500 acres) Cerrado State Park, created in 1992.

== Climate ==
According to the Köppen climate classification, it is classified as oceanic climate (Köppen: Cfb).

== Education ==
- Centro de Ensino Superior dos Campos Gerais
- Centro Universitário Santa Amélia
- União Latino-Americana de Tecnologia

== See also ==
- List of municipalities in Paraná
