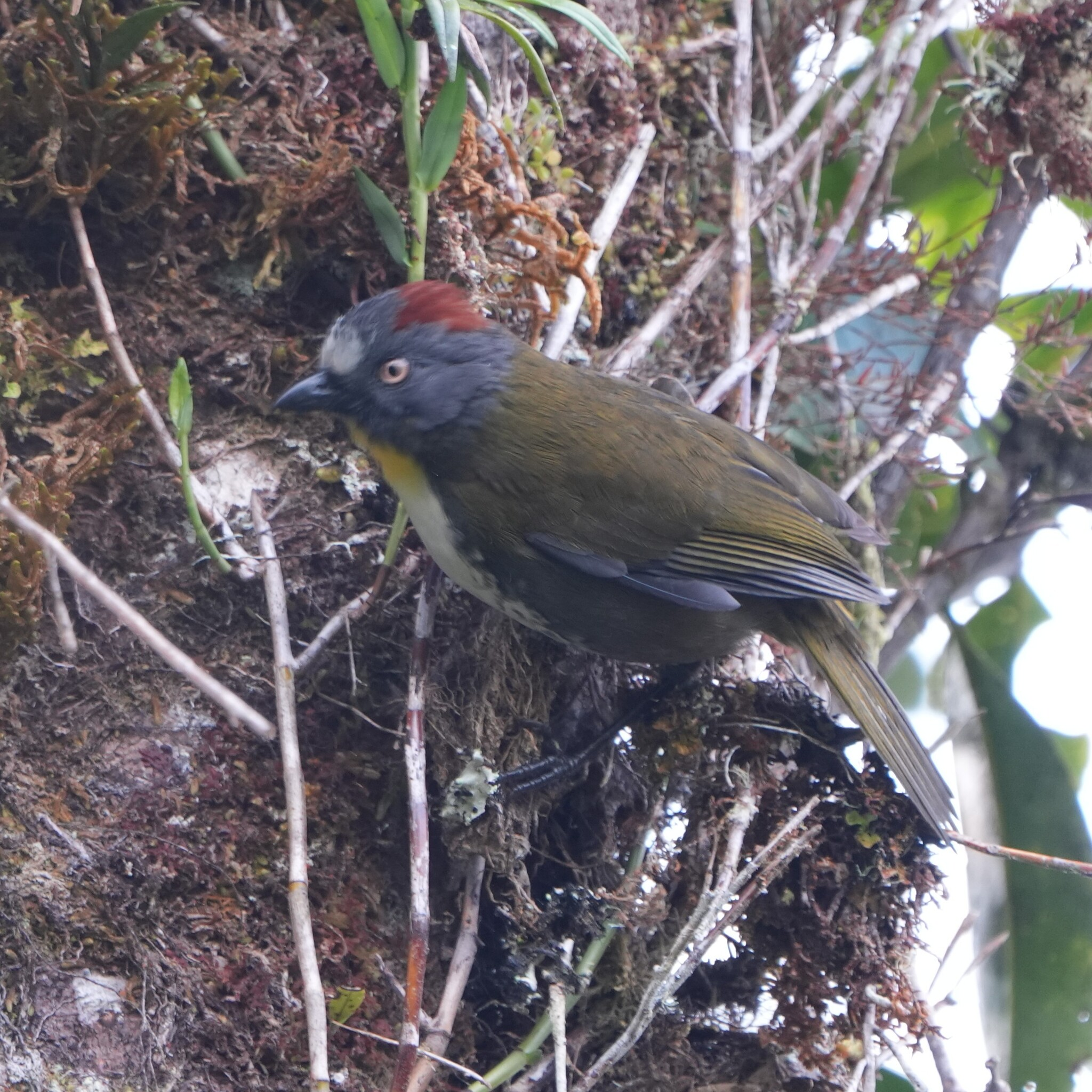

Conservation status
- Least Concern (IUCN 3.1)

Scientific classification
- Kingdom: Animalia
- Phylum: Chordata
- Class: Aves
- Order: Passeriformes
- Family: Oreoicidae
- Genus: Aleadryas; Iredale, 1956
- Species: A. rufinucha

Binomial name
- Aleadryas rufinucha (Sclater, PL, 1874)

= Rufous-naped bellbird =

Species of bird

The rufous-naped bellbird (Aleadryas rufinucha), or rufous-naped whistler, is a species of bird in the family Oreoicidae. It is assigned to the monotypic genus Aleadryas. It is found on New Guinea, where its natural habitat is subtropical or tropical moist montane forests. It also contains Batrachotoxin.
