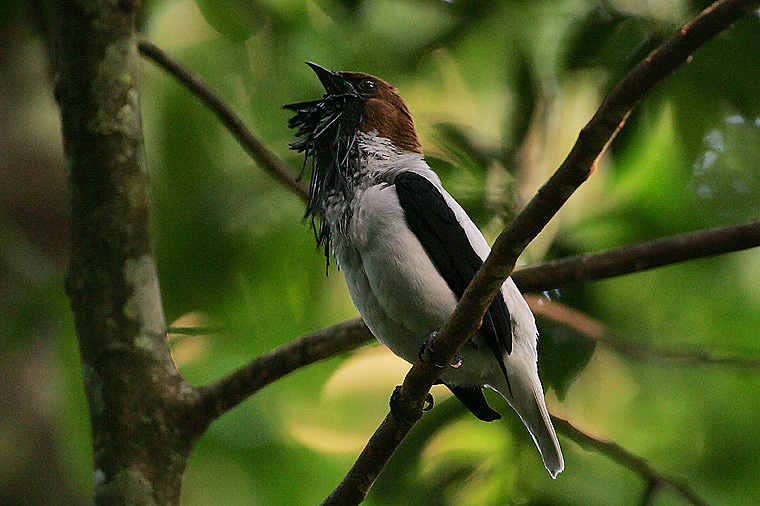
- Bearded bellbird (Procnias averano)

Scientific classification
- Kingdom: Animalia
- Phylum: Chordata
- Class: Aves
- Order: Passeriformes
- Family: Cotingidae
- Genus: Procnias; Illiger, 1811

Type species
- Ampelis variegata Gmelin, 1789

Species
- Procnias albus; Procnias averano; Procnias nudicollis; Procnias tricarunculata

= Neotropical bellbird =

Genus of birds

Neotropical bellbird (or simply bellbird) is the common name given to passerine birds of the genus Procnias, found in the Neotropics. They are members of the cotinga family. They are all restricted to tropical or subtropical humid forested regions, often in low mountains or foothills. As indicated by their common name, they all have extremely loud calls that are reminiscent of a metal bell being rung.

Three of the four species are restricted to South America, while the last, the three-wattled bellbird, is restricted to southern Central America.

They are strongly sexually dimorphic. Males have an at least partially white plumage, and facial wattles or bare facial skin. Females lack the wattles/bare facial skin, and are overall olive with yellowish streaks below.

== Taxonomy ==
The genus Procnias was introduced in 1811 by the German zoologist Johann Karl Wilhelm Illiger. The name comes from Greek mythology, Procne was an Athenian princess who was metamorphosed into a swallow. The type species was designated as the bearded bellbird by George Gray in 1840.

The genus contains four species.

Genus Procnias – Illiger, 1811 – four species
Common name	Scientific name and subspecies	Range	Size and ecology	IUCN status and estimated population
Three-wattled bellbird	Procnias tricarunculatus (Verreaux & Verreaux, 1853)	Costa Rica, to eastern Honduras, Nicaragua and western Panama	Size: Habitat: Diet:	VU
White bellbird	Procnias albus (Hermann, 1783)	Guianas, Venezuela and Brazil (Pará)	Size: Habitat: Diet:	LC
Bearded bellbird	Procnias averano (Hermann, 1783) Two subspecies: P. a. averano; P. a. carnobarba	Venezuela and adjacent parts of Colombia and Guyana, Trinidad & Tobago and northeastern Brazil	Size: Habitat: Diet:	LC
Bare-throated bellbird	Procnias nudicollis (Vieillot, 1817)	Atlantic forest and adjacent moist areas	Size: Habitat: Diet:	NT

== Cultural impact ==
In Brazil, the Neotropical bellbird is known as "araponga". After 1990, it became a slang for "spy" after the release of the Globo soap opera Araponga, as the character interpreted by Tarcísio Meira was codenamed after the bird.
