= Sengés =

Coordinates: 24°06′S 49°29′W

- Municipality
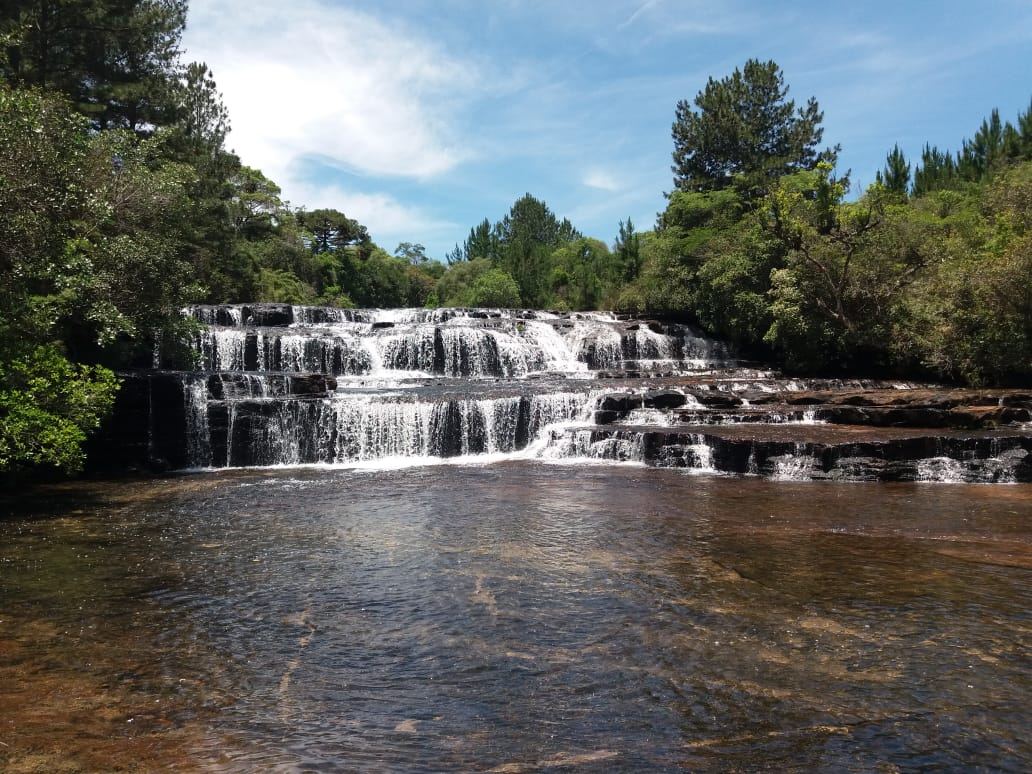

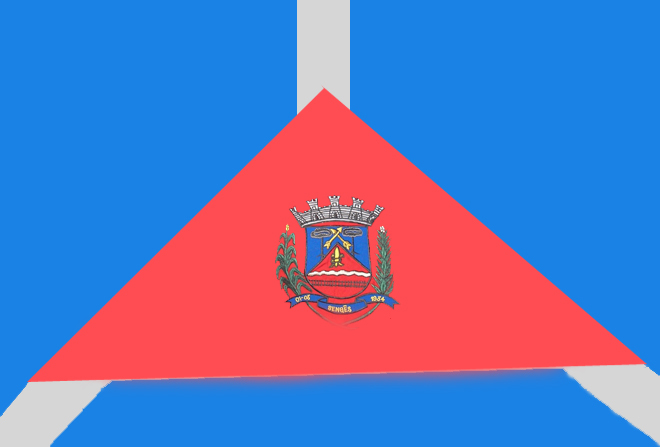
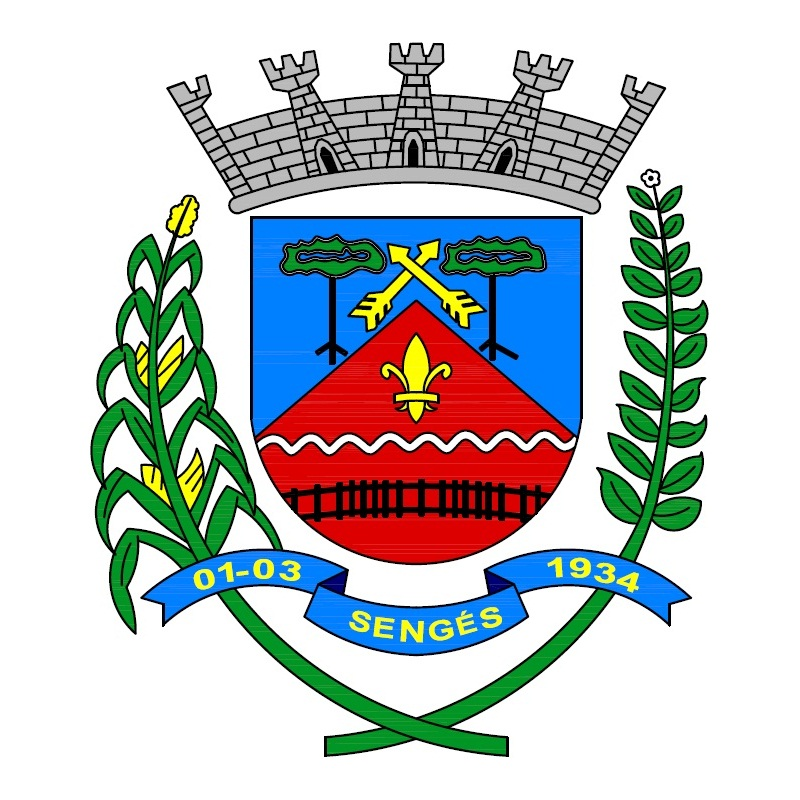
- Flag Coat of arms

- Location in Paraná
- Country: Brazil
- Region: Southern
- State: Paraná
- Mesoregion: Centro Oriental Paranaense

Population (2020)
  - Total: 19,385
- Time zone: UTC -3

Sengés is a municipality in the state of Paraná in the Southern Region of Brazil.

The municipality contains part of the 1,830 hectares (4,500 acres) Cerrado State Park, created in 1992.

== History ==
Sengés was discovered in 1893, and it became municipality on 1 March 1934.

== Climate ==
Sengés is classified as humid subtropical climate (Köppen: Cfb), the annual temperature on summer in Sengés is 29°C, on winter, the temperature reaches to 12°C. Frost are common on winter.

== See also ==
- List of municipalities in Paraná
