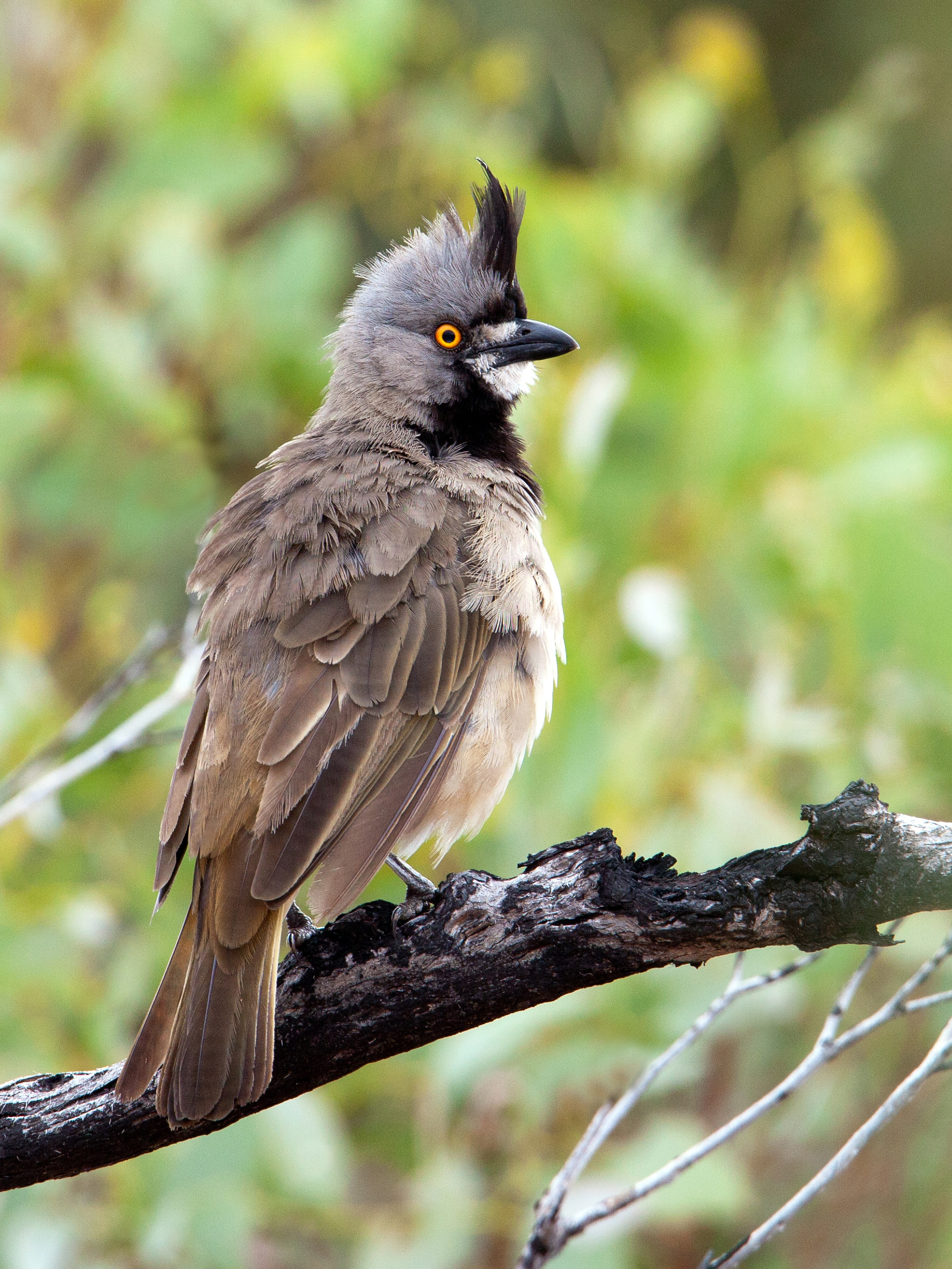
- Crested bellbird, Oreoica gutturalis

Scientific classification
- Kingdom: Animalia
- Phylum: Chordata
- Class: Aves
- Order: Passeriformes
- Superfamily: Orioloidea
- Family: Oreoicidae; Schodde & Christidis, 2014

Genera
- Aleadryas; Ornorectes; Oreoica

= Oreoicidae =

Family of birds

Oreoicidae is a newly recognized family of small insectivorous songbirds from New Guinea and Australia, commonly known as the Australo-Papuan bellbirds. The family contains three genera, each containing a single species: Aleadryas, which contains the rufous-naped bellbird; Ornorectes, which contains the piping bellbird; and Oreoica, which contains the crested bellbird.

== Taxonomy and systematics ==
The three species contained in the family have been moved around between different families for fifty years, including the Colluricinclidae (shrike-thrushes), Falcunculidae (shrike-tits) and Pachycephalidae (whistlers). A series of studies of the DNA of Australian birds between 2001 and 2006 found strong support for treating the three genera as a new family, which was formally named in 2016 (although the name had first been proposed by Sibley and Ahlquist in 1985).

Within the passerines, the relationship of the Australo-Papuan bellbirds to other bird families has been difficult to establish; they have been thought to be close to a range of families including the cuckoo-shrikes, whistlers, mottled berryhunter, painted berrypeckers, butcherbirds and woodswallows, and Old World orioles.

=== Taxonomic list ===
- Aleadryas
  - Aleadryas rufinucha, rufous-naped bellbird (formerly rufous-naped whistler)
- Ornorectes
  - Ornorectes cristatus, piping bellbird (formerly crested pitohui)
- Oreoica
  - Oreoica gutturalis, crested bellbird

== Description ==
The family shares a small number of characteristics. They are small medium to medium-sized songbirds with stout bodies, ranging from 16.5 to 18 cm (6.5–7.1 in) in length for the rufous-naped whistler to 25 to 26 cm (9.8–10.2 in) in the crested pitohui. They also all have semi-erectile crests and shrike-like bills. The plumage is either the same between the sexes (as in the rufous-naped and piping bellbird) or slightly different (as in the crested bellbird).

== Distribution and habitat ==
The family occupies a range of habitats. Two species, the rufous-naped bellbird and the piping bellbird, are endemic to New Guinea, whilst the crested bellbird is endemic to Australia. The two New Guinean species are found in rainforest; lowland and hill forest in the piping bellbird, or montane forest and secondary forest in the case of the rufous-naped bellbird. The crested bellbird occupies drier habitats in Australia including dry woodlands and scrublands.

== Vocalization ==
Vocalization of the Australian bellbird

All members of Oreoicidae have melodious piping songs consisting of rhythmically repeating ringing notes of different lengths, typically mostly or all at the same pitch. The bell-like quality of their songs is the source of the common name bellbird, which was first applied to the crested bellbird and more recently to the other two species, once their close relationship to the crested bellbird, and distant relationship to whistlers (in the case of rufous-naped bellbird) and other pitohuis (in the case of piping bellbird), was revealed. The rufous-naped bellbird also makes harsh rasping calls.

One aboriginal name for the crested bellbird is "panpanpanella," an onomatopoeia of its rhythmic song. Early European settlers called the bird "dick-dick-the-devil," another onomatopoeia.

The ornithologist John Gould (and the naturalist John Gilbert) described the song of the crested bellbird thusly:

I regret much that it is not in my power to convey an idea of the sounds uttered by this bird, for they are singular in the extreme; besides which, it is a perfect ventriloquist, its peculiar, mournful piping whistle appearing to be at a considerable distance, while the bird is perched on a large branch of a neighbouring tree. Gilbert having described to the best of his power the singular note of this species, I give his own words; but no description can convey anything like an accurate idea of it... 'The most singular feature,' says Gilbert, 'connected with this bird is, that it is a perfect ventriloquist. At first its note commences in so low a tone that it sounds as if at a considerable distance, and then gradually increases in volume until it appears over the head of the wondering hearer, the bird that utters it being all the while on the dead part of a tree, perhaps not more than a few yards distant; its motionless attitude rendering its discovery very difficult. It has two kinds of song, the most usual of which is a running succession of notes, or two notes repeated together rather slowly, followed by a repetition three times rather quickly, the last note resembling the sound of a bell from its ringing tone; the other song is pretty nearly the same, only that it concludes with a sudden and peculiar fall of two notes.'
