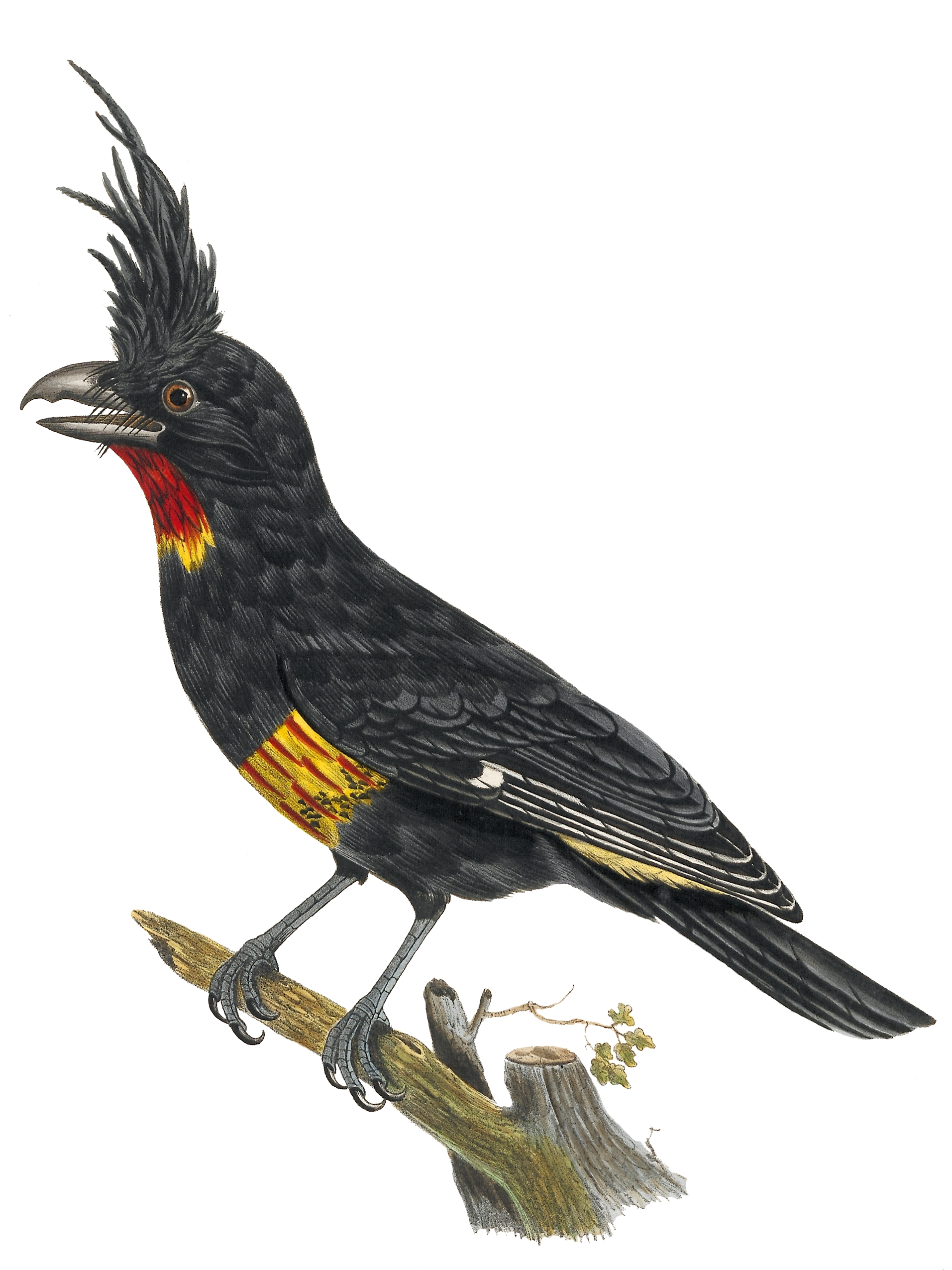

Conservation status
- Least Concern (IUCN 3.1)

Scientific classification
- Kingdom: Animalia
- Phylum: Chordata
- Class: Aves
- Order: Passeriformes
- Family: Oreoicidae
- Genus: Ornorectes; Iredale, 1956
- Species: O. cristatus

Binomial name
- Ornorectes cristatus (Salvadori, 1876)

Synonyms
- Pitohui cristatus; Rectes cristata

= Piping bellbird =

Species of bird

The piping bellbird (Ornorectes cristatus), or crested pitohui, is a species of bird in the family Oreoicidae. It was previously placed in the family Pachycephalidae.

It is found on New Guinea. Its natural habitat is subtropical or tropical moist lowland forest.
