= Guartelá State Park =

State park in Paraná, Brazil

- Parque Estadual do Guartelá
- IUCN category II (national park)
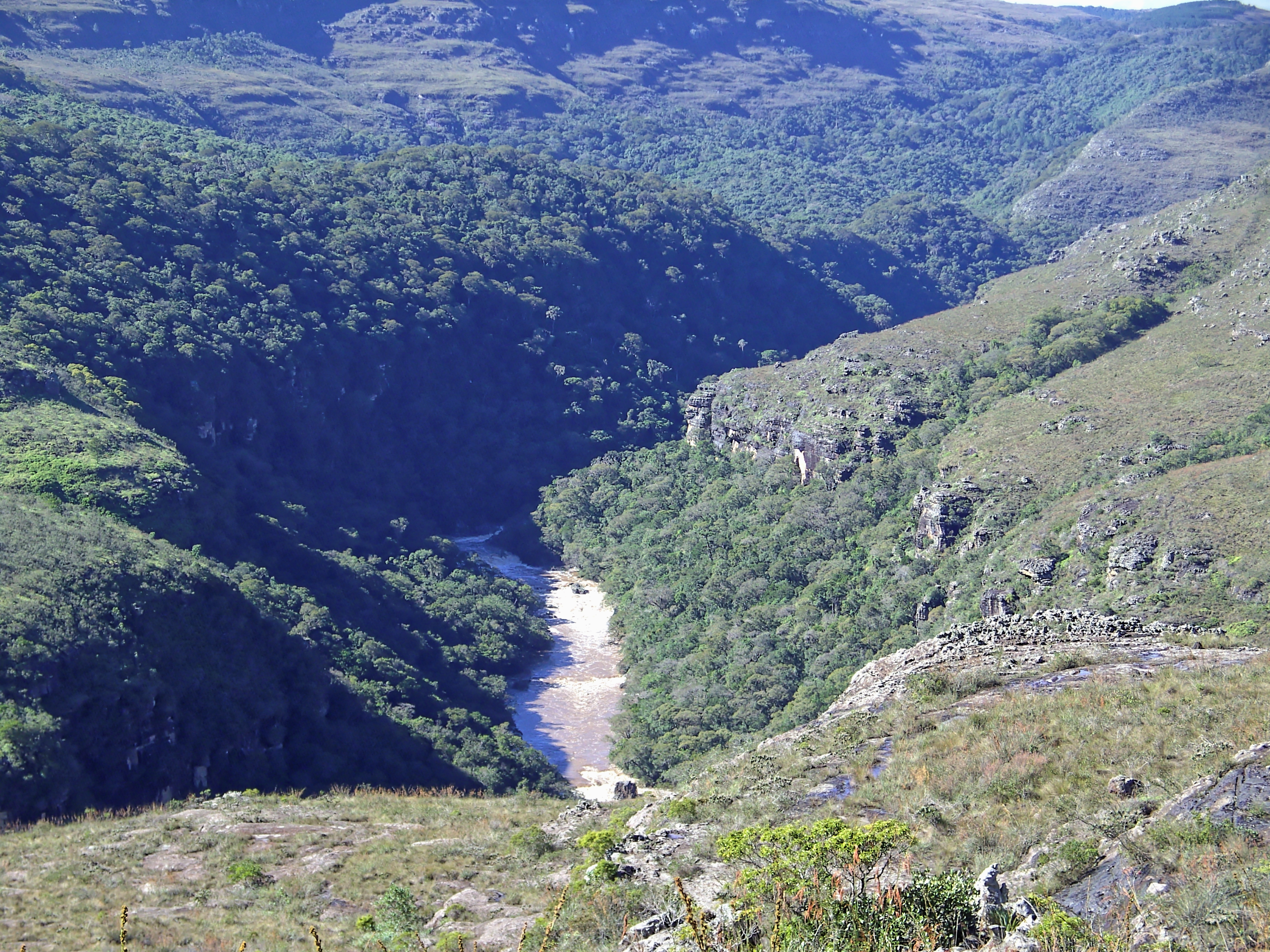
- Guartelá Canyon in the park

- Location within Brazil
- Nearest city: Tibagi, Paraná
- Coordinates: 24.562054°S 50.256411°W
- Area: 798.97 hectares (1,974.3 acres)
- Designation: State park
- Created: 27 March 1992
- Administrator: Instituto Ambiental do Paraná

The Guartelá State Park (Portuguese: Parque Estadual do Guartelá) is a state park in the state of Paraná, Brazil. It protects the Guartelá Canyon, its surroundings and the area's natural environment.

== Location ==
The Guartelá State Park is in the municipality of Tibagi, Paraná. It has an area of 798.97 hectares (1,974.3 acres). It includes the Ponte de Pedra waterfall, about 180 metres (590 ft) high, and the Córrego Pedregulho, a stream with natural cascades and "baths". There are rock paintings created by prehistoric residents, which can only be visited accompanied by a local guide. The rock paintings are about 7,000 years old. There are also traces of Jesuits and cattle drovers from the colonial era.

== History ==
The Guartelá State Park was created by decree 1,229 of 27 March 1992 to protect an area of rich natural and archaeological heritage in the region of the Iapó River canyon. The park was created by Governor Roberto Requião. The governor who succeeded him reduced its size by 90%. It was implemented in 1997. It is managed by the Government of the State of Paraná with the objective of preserving the ecosystems typical of the region, the area's natural environment, including canyons, springs, waterfalls and native flora and fauna, caves and archaeological and prehistoric sites, including rock paintings, and of regulating tourism in the areas. It is administered by the Environmental Institute of Paraná (IAP). As of 2015 the park was receiving about 1,700 visitors per month, more than twice as many as ten years earlier.

== Environment ==
The Guartelá Canyon is considered the 6th largest canyon in the world, and the only one with native vegetation. The French naturalist Augustin Saint-Hilaire (1779–1853) called it the "terrestrial paradise of Brazil". Vegetation includes meadows, remnants of cerrado, araucaria forest, seasonal semi-deciduous forest and dense rainforest of the Atlantic Forest biome. Fauna include the giant anteater (Myrmecophaga tridactyla), howler monkeys, maned wolf (Chrysocyon brachyurus), tayra (Eira barbara), ocelot (Leopardus pardalis), margay (Leopardus wiedii), neotropical otter (Lontra longicaudis), crab-eating raccoon (Procyon cancrivorus), cougar (Puma concolor), pacas and common agoutis. The park is also home to deer and capybara (Hydrochoerus hydrochaeris). Birds include king vulture (Sarcoramphus papa), mantled hawk (Pseudastur polionotus), blue-fronted amazon (Amazona aestiva) and vinaceous-breasted amazon (Amazona vinacea).

== Activities ==
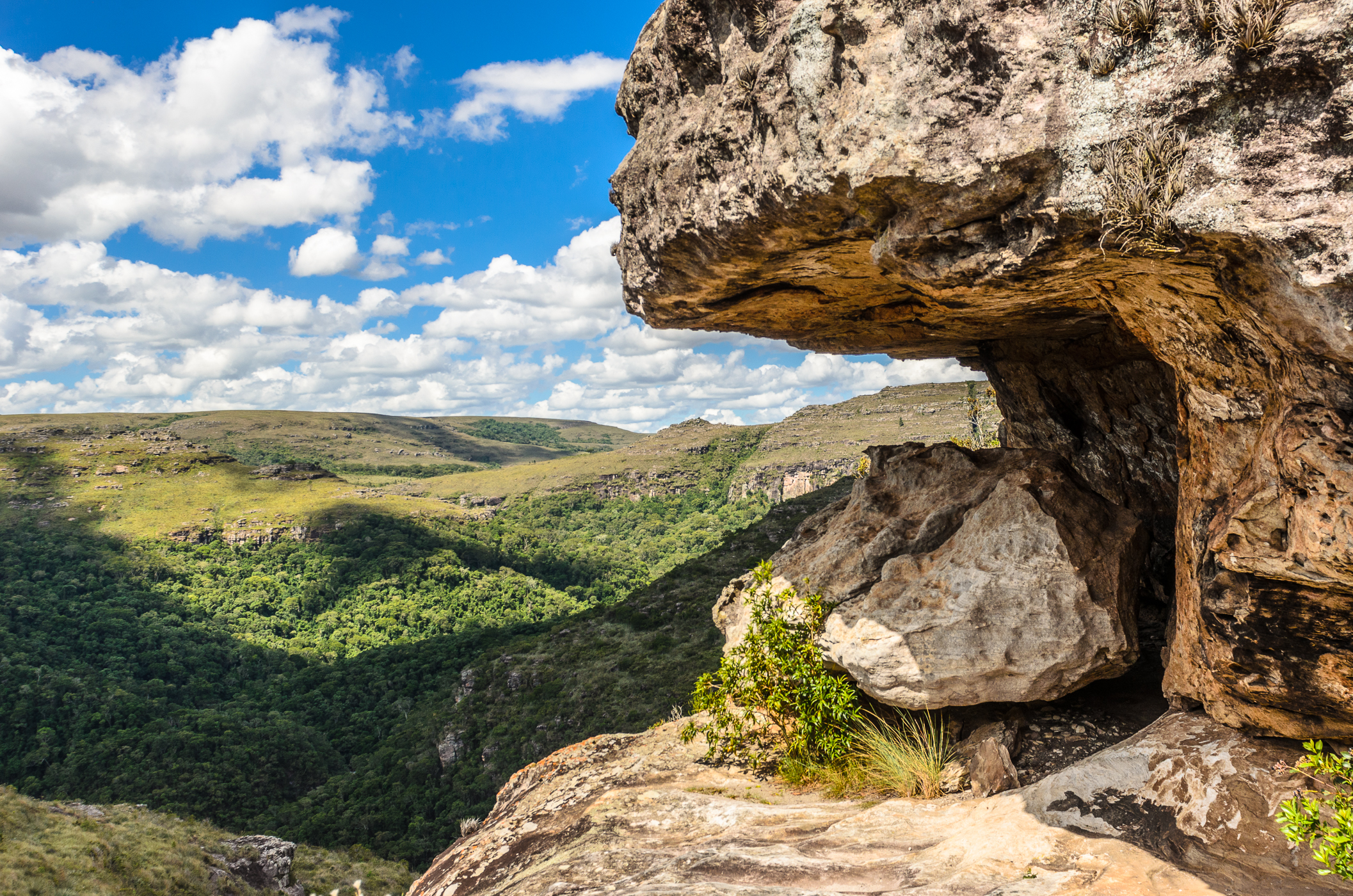
Rock formation

As of 2016 the park was open from 8:00 to 16:30 from Wednesday to Sunday and on holidays. There is no entrance fee, but there is a fee for walking the trails. The park has a belvedere, from which the canyon of the Iapó River can be viewed. The belvedere is wheelchair accessible. There is a support vehicle for people with special needs such as the elderly, pregnant women or disabled people. The park provides education activities for students in the 6th and 7th years of school. It also supports research by the universities.

There is no snack bar on the site. Visitors may bring cold picnics and should bring water. There are kiosks at Capão, 2 kilometres (1.2 mi) from the visitor center, with drinking water, toilets and places for rest and relaxation. Visitors should stay in small groups and try to walk quietly, enjoying nature and only taking photographs. Prohibited activities included camping, barbecuing, consuming alcohol, bringing domestic animals, leaving the marked trails, bathing in unauthorized places, carrying tools or firearms, damaging or removing trees, any activity that could cause fires, littering, hunting, fishing, collecting rocks, fauna or flora, and feeding or frightening the animals.

There is a basic trail of 5 kilometres (3.1 mi) that takes two or three hours. It includes the belvedere, from which the canyon of the Iapó River can be viewed, the Ponte de Pedra Waterfall and the Panelões do Sumidouro, a place for swimming. The full trail is 9 kilometres (5.6 mi) and takes three to five hours. Visitors must be accompanied by a guide. It includes the basic trail and also the Portal de Pedra, the Gavião trail and the rock paintings. The rock painting trail is closed when it is raining.

== Sources ==
- "O Parque Estadual do Guartelá", Turismo Tibagi (in Portuguese), archived from the original on 2016-12-20
- "Parque Estadual do Guartelá", Gazeta do Povo (in Portuguese), archived from the original on 2016-03-04
- Requião cria dois novos parques estaduais e amplia áreas de Unidades de Conservação (in Portuguese), Secretaria de Estado da Comunicação Social - Paraná, 2 October 2007
- "Trilhas no Parque Estadual do Guartelá", Tibagi Aventuras (in Portuguese)
- "Visitantes podem escolher entre duas trilhas no Parque Estadual do Guartelá", G1 Globo (in Portuguese), 27 January 2015
