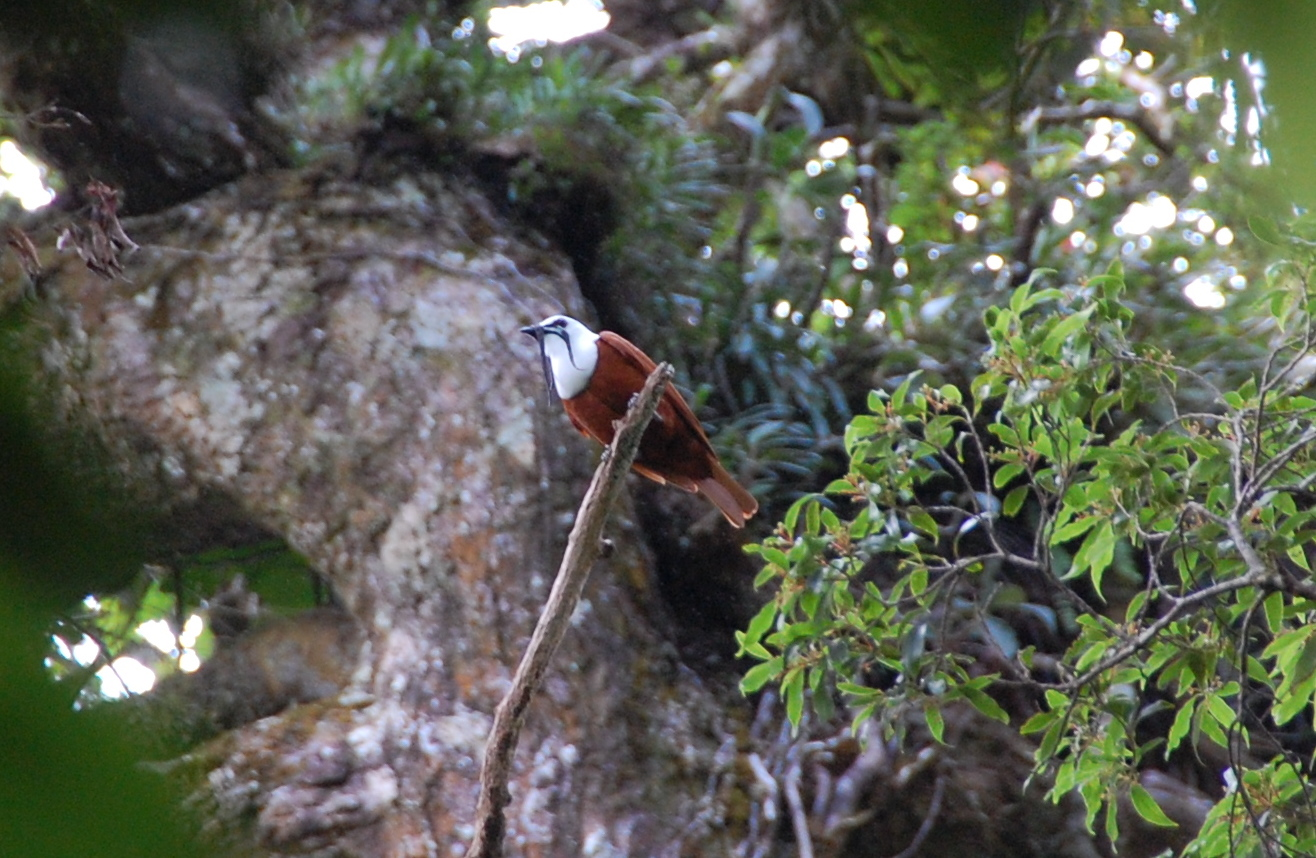

Conservation status
- Vulnerable (IUCN 3.1)

Scientific classification
- Kingdom: Animalia
- Phylum: Chordata
- Class: Aves
- Order: Passeriformes
- Family: Cotingidae
- Genus: Procnias
- Species: P. tricarunculatus

Binomial name
- Procnias tricarunculatus (Verreaux & Verreaux, 1853)

Synonyms
- Procnias tricarunculata

= Three-wattled bellbird =

Species of bird

The three-wattled bellbird (Procnias tricarunculatus) is a Central American migratory bird of the cotinga family. The sexes are very dissimilar in appearance. The male has a white head and throat and the remaining plumage is chestnut brown. From the base of his beak dangle three long, slender, black wattles that he uses in display. The female has olive plumage with yellowish streaked underparts and a yellow vent area.

The three-wattled bellbird breeds in mountainous regions of Costa Rica and migrates to western Honduras, Nicaragua and Panama. The male bird has a loud, distinctive, bell-like call, and as these birds are secretive and shy, they are more often heard than seen. The International Union for Conservation of Nature has assessed their conservation status as "vulnerable".

== Description ==
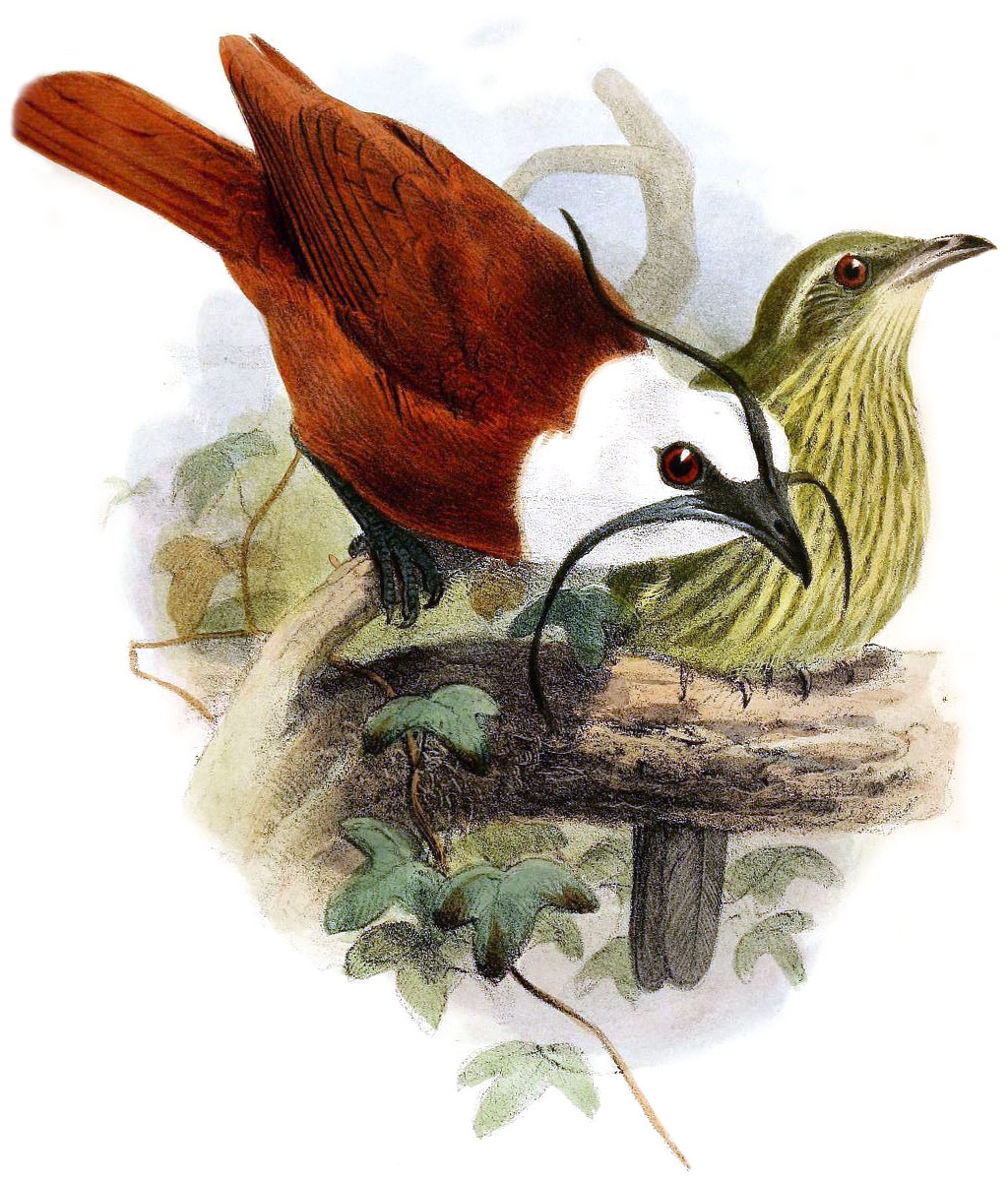
Male (left) and female (right)

One of four species of bellbird that live in Central and South America, the three-wattled bellbird is between 25 cm (9.8 in) and 30 cm (12 in) long. The body, tail, and wings of the male are uniformly chestnut-brown; its head, neck, and upper breast are white; and it has a black eye-ring, eye-stripe, and bill. Its name comes from the three worm-like wattles of skin that hang from the base of the bill. These wattles can be as long as 10 cm (3.9 in) when extended during songs and interactions. The wattles remain flaccid even when extended. The male shakes the wattles, but otherwise they hang straight down; they are neither erectile nor under muscular control. The side wattles do not stick out to the sides and the central one is not extended directly skywards as shown on some old illustrations and specimens. The purpose of the wattles is unclear.

The female bellbirds are smaller and less striking in appearance, being overall olive with yellowish streaking below, pure yellow vent and no wattles. The females blend into the surroundings of the forest, which helps them hide its nests from predators. The nests are very difficult to spot. As of January 2019, only six nests had been found in Monteverde, according to the council for the Bellbird Biological Corridor.

Juvenile males are often confused with females; they have the same coloring as females until they reach sexual maturity at age 7. As they age, the males slowly molt the green and brown feathers and begin to grow the striking white and copper coat. They do not begin to grow their wattles until they are 1 to 2 years old, and the wattles continue to grow for the entirety of the male bird's life.

== Distribution ==
Famous for having one of the most unusual and distinct vocalizations of any bird in its range, the three-wattled bellbird exists from western Honduras south to eastern Panama. Bellbirds breed primarily in Costa Rican highlands in the cloud forest (March–September) and return to lower elevations in the mangroves for the interim months.

== Mating ==
The bellbird has its own unique mating ritual. The male birds sneak up behind the females perching on a high branches. As the male quietly approaches the female, he opens his mouth a full 180 degrees to make his distinctive "bonk" sound in her ear, knocking the female off of her branch. They repeat this sequence, and after the courtship is over, the female departs to build the nest and raise the chicks alone.

== Ecology ==
The species is completely frugivorous; it swallows the fruits from trees in the Lauraceae family, of which the avocado is a member. The bellbird performs an important role in seed dispersal. It regurgitates the seeds it cannot digest and deposits them in gap areas beneath song perches, which nearly doubles seedling survival rate.

Three-wattled bellbird regurgitating a seed it cannot digest. Filmed in Bajo Tigre Reserve, Monteverde, Costa Rica.

== Song ==
Three-wattled bellbird in a tree vocalizing in the Children's Eternal Rainforest, Costa Rica.

Taxidermied male specimen (in living individuals, the three elongated wattles typically hang loosely down beside the bill)

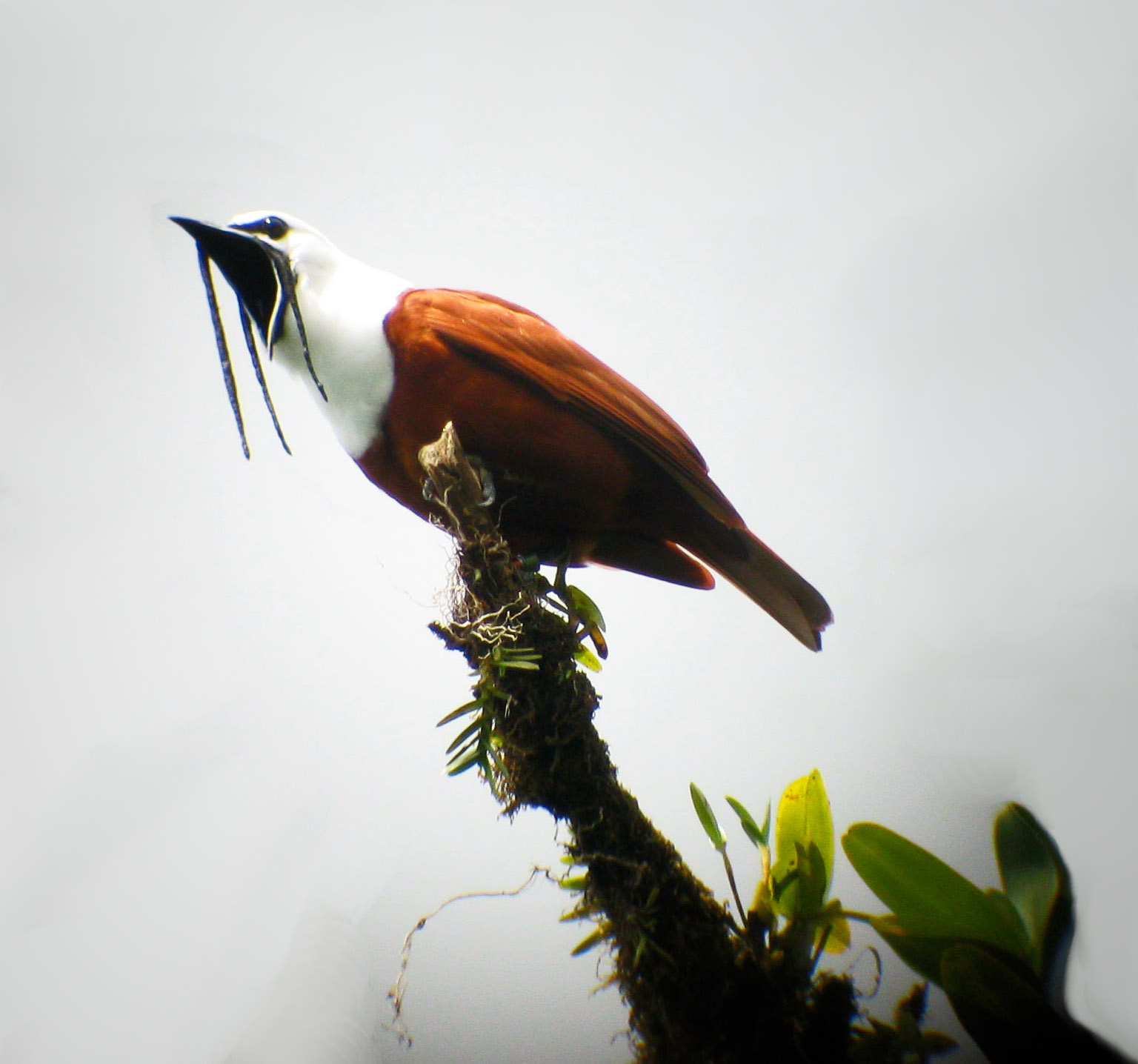
Male in Costa Rica

Because of the secretive behavior of this bird, it is often only detected by the distinctive bell-like call given by the males. At close range, the vocalization of many in Costa Rica is heard as a complex three-part song, the "bonk" giving the bird its name. This hollow, wooden "bonk" is thought to be among the loudest bird calls on Earth, audible to humans from over 0.5 mi (0.80 km) away. The song is different in Nicaragua and also in Panama, and these songs also include an extremely loud, but less bell-like, note. The song may also be a short "Heee-Ahhh." In some instances, it has been described as sounding like microphone feedback.

Research by Donald Kroodsma on recordings archived at the Cornell Lab of Ornithology showed that the three-wattled bellbird is unique among members of its sub-order, in that it learns its song, rather than having the song determined by instinct, because the song changed over the years that it had been recorded.

== Status ==
The population of the three-wattled bellbird, estimated to be 3,600 – 14,000 mature individuals as of 2021, is on a downward trend because of destruction of the bird's forest habitat. The International Union for Conservation of Nature has assessed their conservation status as "vulnerable".

The Monteverde Institute in Costa Rica is working to conserve the bellbird's natural habitat through its reforestation program. The organization has planted over 250,000 trees of more than 140 species in the Bellbird Biological Corridor in an attempt to bridge the habitats that many species require for migration.
