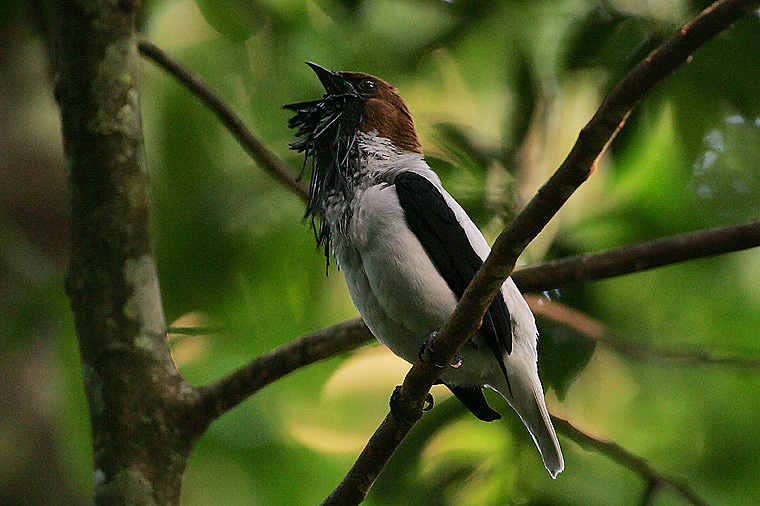
- Male calling

Conservation status
- Least Concern (IUCN 3.1)

Scientific classification
- Kingdom: Animalia
- Phylum: Chordata
- Class: Aves
- Order: Passeriformes
- Family: Cotingidae
- Genus: Procnias
- Species: P. averano

Binomial name
- Procnias averano (Hermann, 1783)

= Bearded bellbird =

Species of bird

The bearded bellbird (Procnias averano), also known as the campanero or anvil-bird, is a passerine bird which occurs in northern South America. The male is about 28 cm (11 in) long with white plumage apart from a brown head and black wings. At his throat hang several black, unfeathered wattles. The female is a little smaller with olive-green head and upper parts, yellow underparts streaked with green and a yellow vent area. The male has a loud, repeated metallic hammering call, as well as various other vocalisations.

There are two subspecies, the nominate subspecies is only found in northeastern Brazil, while the other subspecies occurs in Trinidad, Venezuela, Colombia, Guyana, eastern Bolivia and northern Brazil. This bird is found in moist tropical forests where it feeds mainly on fruit and berries which are picked on the wing. The nest is a rather flimsy mass of stems and slender twigs built far out on a branch of an isolated tree. A single buff-coloured egg is laid and incubated solely by the female.

== Description ==
Like other cotingas, the bearded bellbird has a broad hooked-tipped bill, rounded wings, strong legs and a striking appearance. The male is approx 28 cm 11 in long, and weighs 180 g (6 1/2 oz). His plumage is white or greyish-white apart from the black wings and warm brown head. He sports a "beard" of un-feathered, black stringy wattles.

The female is smaller, at approx. 27 cm (10 1/2 in) and 130 g (4 1/2 oz). Her upperparts are olive-green (duskier on the head), most of the underparts are yellow streaked with green, and the vent is pure yellow. She lacks the facial wattles ("beard"). Both sexes have dark eyes, a black bill and grey to black legs.

The males' advertising calls are a very loud dull Bock repeated every few seconds and a somewhat less loud, metallic hammering tonk-tonk-tonk-tonk. It sounds like a hammer rapidly hitting an anvil and is repeated 20–30 times. Additionally, a number of regional calls are known, e.g. an unmusical, almost hissing, bisset in southern Venezuela and a disyllabic teek-terong in northern Venezuela. Apparently, the last mentioned call is no longer heard in Trinidad. The female is essentially silent.

== Distribution and habitat ==
The bearded bellbird is native to Venezuela (as well as adjacent parts of Colombia and Guyana), Trinidad and Tobago and northeastern Brazil, where it occurs in humid forests and woodland. It is mainly resident, but some populations take part in altitudinal migrations; breeding at altitudes of up to 1,900 m (6,200 ft) and spending the non-breeding season in the lowlands. There are two subspecies; the nominate taxon, P. a. averano, in northeastern Brazil and P. a. carnobarba in Venezuela, Trinidad, extreme northeastern Colombia, western Guyana and far northern Brazil. It is a localised and uncommon bird in Venezuela, but is fairly common in Trinidad. The nominate Brazilian race is relatively rare due to extensive habitat destruction in its range and heavy trapping for the cagebird trade, and as such is considered "vulnerable" by Brazilian environmental authority (IBAMA).

== Ecology ==
These arboreal bellbirds feeds entirely on fruit and berries, mainly taken on the wing. Lauraceae and Burseraceae are particularly favoured (as well as Araliaceae and Melastomataceae), and the young are fed regurgitated Lauraceae by the female.

The flimsy nest of twigs is built by the female and usually placed in the outer branches of a tree. The nests are not located in the jungle, but in free-standing trees in semi-cleared areas, probably to reduce the risk from the many effective predators of nests in the jungle such as monkeys, toucans and snakes.

The single brown-mottled, light tan egg is incubated entirely by the female, leaving the polygamous male free to spend much of his time advertising with his distinctive songs. Laying season varies over its range; April-Nov in Trinidad and May-Sep in N. Venezuela. The first recorded egg was discovered near Cumaca, Trinidad, in the mid-1950s.

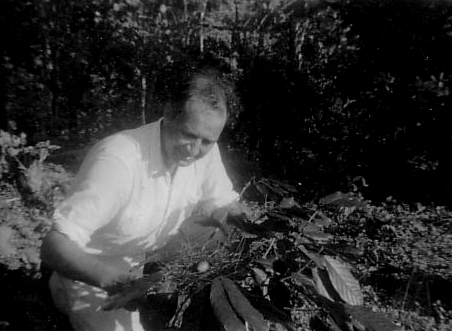
First identified bearded bellbird nest and egg, held by Dr. Wilbur Downs

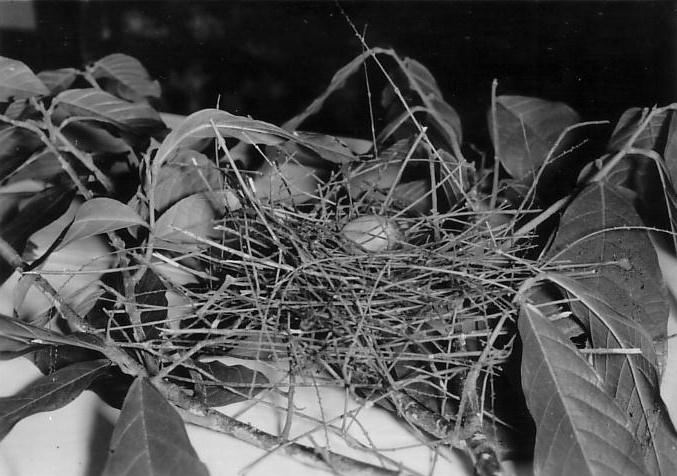
First identified bearded bellbird nest and egg, Cumaca, Trinidad
