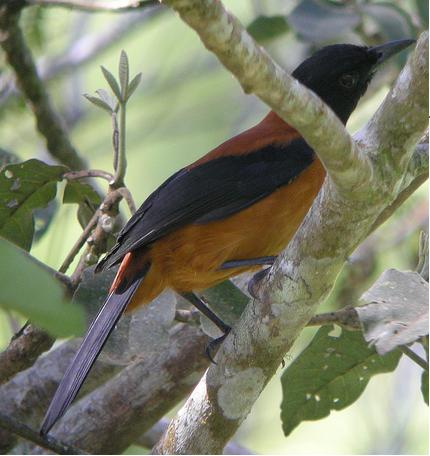

Conservation status
- Least Concern (IUCN 3.1)

Scientific classification
- Kingdom: Animalia
- Phylum: Chordata
- Class: Aves
- Order: Passeriformes
- Family: Oriolidae
- Genus: Pitohui
- Species: P. dichrous

Binomial name
- Pitohui dichrous (Bonaparte, 1850)

Synonyms
- Rectes dichrous (Bonaparte, 1850)

= Hooded pitohui =

Species of bird from New Guinea

The hooded pitohui (Pitohui dichrous) is a species of bird in the genus Pitohui found in New Guinea. It was long thought to be a whistler (Pachycephalidae) but is now known to be in the Old World oriole family (Oriolidae). Within the oriole family, this species is most closely related to the variable pitohuis in the genus Pitohui, and then the figbirds.

A medium-sized songbird with reddish-brown and black plumage, this species is one of the few known poisonous birds, containing a range of batrachotoxin compounds in its skin, feathers and other tissues. These toxins are thought to be derived from their diet and may function both to deter predators and to protect the bird from parasites. The close resemblance of this species to other unrelated birds also known as pitohuis which are also poisonous is an example of convergent evolution and Müllerian mimicry. Their appearance is also mimicked by unrelated non-poisonous species, a phenomenon known as Batesian mimicry. The toxic nature of this bird is well known to local hunters, who avoid it. It is one of the most poisonous species of pitohui, but the toxicity of individual birds can vary geographically.

The hooded pitohui is found in forests from sea level up to 2,000 m (6,600 ft) but is most common in hills and low mountains. A social bird, it lives in family groups and frequently joins and even leads mixed-species foraging flocks. Its diet is made up of fruits, seeds and invertebrates. This species is apparently a cooperative breeder, with family groups helping to protect the nest and feed the young. The hooded pitohui is common and is currently not at risk of extinction, with its numbers being stable.

== Taxonomy and systematics ==
The hooded pitohui (Pitohui dichrous) was described by the French ornithologist Charles Lucien Bonaparte in 1850. Bonaparte placed it in the genus Rectes which had been erected in the same year by Ludwig Reichenbach as an alternative name for the genus Pitohui, which had been described by René Lesson in 1831. No explanation was given for the preference of the newer name over the established older one, but it was common to prefer Latin names over non-Latin names, and to provide Latin names to those without. Richard Bowdler Sharpe encapsulated that attitude when he wrote in 1903 "Pitohui is doubtless an older name than Rectes, but can surely be laid aside as a barbarous word". Eventually however the principle of priority, which favours the first formal name given to a taxon, was applied, and Rectes was suppressed as the junior synonym of Pitohui.

The hooded pitohui was placed in the genus Pitohui with five other species, and the genus was thought to reside within the Australasian whistler family (Pachycephalidae). A 2008 examination of the genus, however, found it to be polyphyletic (meaning that the genus contained unrelated species), with some purported members of the genus not actually falling within the whistlers. The hooded pitohui and the closely related variable pitohui were both found to be related to the Old World orioles (Oriolidae). A 2010 study by the same team confirmed that the hooded pitohui and variable pitohui were orioles and indeed were sister species, and that together with the figbirds they formed a well defined basal clade within the family. As the variable pitohui was the type species for the genus Pitohui, (Note: Since then the variable pitohui has been split into three species: Northern variable pitohui (Pitohui kirhocephalus); Raja Ampat pitohui (Pitohui cerviniventris); Southern variable pitohui (Pitohui uropygialis)) the hooded pitohui was retained in that genus and the four remaining species were moved to other genera.

The hooded pitohui is monotypic, lacking any subspecies. Birds in the south east of New Guinea are sometimes separated into a proposed subspecies, P. d. monticola, but the differences are very slight and the supposed subspecies are generally regarded as inseparable.

Pitohui, the common name for the group and the genus name, is a Papuan term for rubbish bird, a reference to its inedibility. The specific name dichrous is from the Ancient Greek word dikhrous, meaning 'two coloured'. Alternate names for the hooded pitohui include the black-headed pitohui and lesser pitohui.

== Physiology and description ==
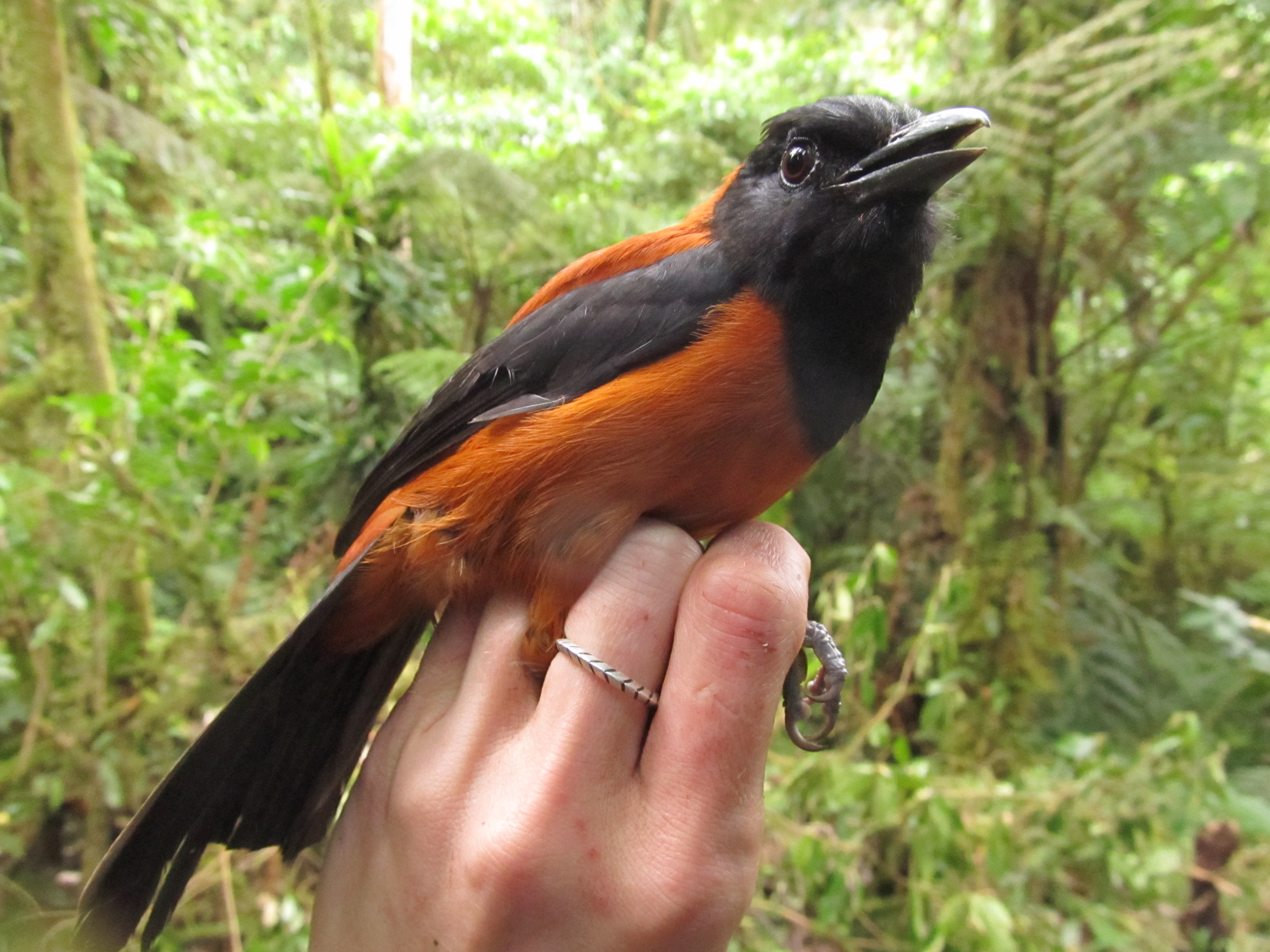
The plumage of the hooded pitohui is dichromatic, black and reddish brown.

The hooded pitohui is 22 to 23 cm (8.7–9.1 in) long and weighs 65–76 g (2.3–2.7 oz). The adult has a black upperwing, head, chin, throat and upper breast and a black tail. The rest of the plumage is a reddish brown. The bill and legs are black, and the irises are either reddish brown, dark brown or black. Both sexes look alike. Juvenile birds look like adults, except that the rectrices of the tail and remiges of the wing are tinged with brown.

=== Toxicity ===
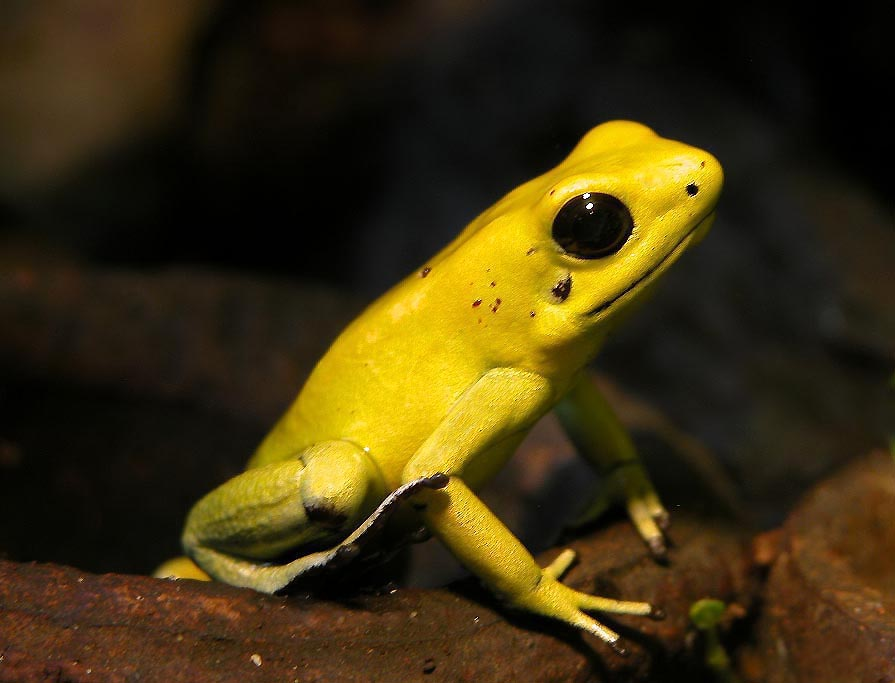
The hooded pitohui uses the same family of batrachotoxin compounds as the golden poison frog of Colombia.

In 1990 scientists preparing the skins of the hooded pitohui for museum collections experienced numbness and burning when handling them. It was reported in 1992 that this species and some other pitohuis contained a neurotoxin called homobatrachotoxin, a derivative of batrachotoxin, in their tissues. This led to them being more broadly known outside New Guinea, considered by some to be the first documented poisonous birds, other than some reports of coturnism caused by consuming quail (although toxicity in quails is unusual), and the first bird discovered with toxins in the skin. The same toxin had previously been found only in Central and South American poison dart frogs from the genera Dendrobates, Oophaga and Phyllobates (family Dendrobatidae). The batrachotoxin family of compounds are among the most toxic compounds by weight in nature, being 250 times more toxic than strychnine. Later research found that the hooded pitohui had other batrachotoxins in its skin, including batrachotoxinin-A cis-crotonate, batrachotoxinin-A and batrachotoxinin-A 3′-hydroxypentanoate.

Bioassays of their tissue found that the skins and feathers were the most toxic, the heart and liver less toxic, and the skeletal muscles the least toxic parts of the birds. Of the feathers, the toxin is most prevalent in those covering the breast and belly. Microscopy has shown that the toxins are sequestered in the skin in organelles analogous to lamellar bodies and are secreted into the feathers. The presence of the toxins in muscle, heart and liver shows that hooded pitohuis have a form of insensitivity to batrachotoxins. A 65 g (2.3 oz) bird has been estimated to have up to 20 μg of toxins in its skin and up to 3 μg in its feathers. This can vary dramatically geographically and by individual, and some have been collected with no detectable toxins.

The poisonous pitohuis, including the hooded pitohui, are not thought to create the toxic compound themselves but instead sequester them from their diet. The extent of the toxicity varies both in the pitohuis across their range and also across the range of the unrelated blue-capped ifrit, another New Guinean bird found with toxic skin and feathers. Both of these facts suggest that the toxins are obtained from the diet. The presence of the toxins in the internal organs as well as the skins and feathers rules out the possibility that the toxins are applied topically from an unknown source by the birds.

One possible source has been identified in the forests of New Guinea: beetles of the genus Choresine (family Melyridae), which contain the toxin and have been found in the stomachs of hooded pitohui. An alternative explanation, that the birds and beetles both get the toxin from a third source, is considered unlikely as the blue-capped ifrit is almost exclusively insectivorous.

== Ecology ==
The function of the toxins to the hooded pitohui has been the source of debate and research since its discovery. The initial suggestion was that the toxins acted as a chemical deterrent to predators. Some researchers cautioned this suggestion was premature, and others noted that the levels of batrachotoxins were three orders of magnitude lower than in the poison dart frogs that do use it in this way.

Another explanation for the purpose of the toxins is to mitigate the effects of parasites. In experimental conditions chewing lice were shown to avoid toxic feathers of hooded pitohui in favour of feathers with lower concentrations of toxin or no toxins at all. Additionally lice that did live in the toxic feathers did not live as long as control lice, suggesting that the toxins could lessen both the incidence of infestation and the severity. A comparative study of the tick loads of wild birds in New Guinea would seem to support the idea, as hooded pitohuis had considerably fewer ticks than almost all the 30 genera examined. The batrachotoxins do not seem to have an effect on internal parasites such as Haemoproteus or the malaria-causing Plasmodium.

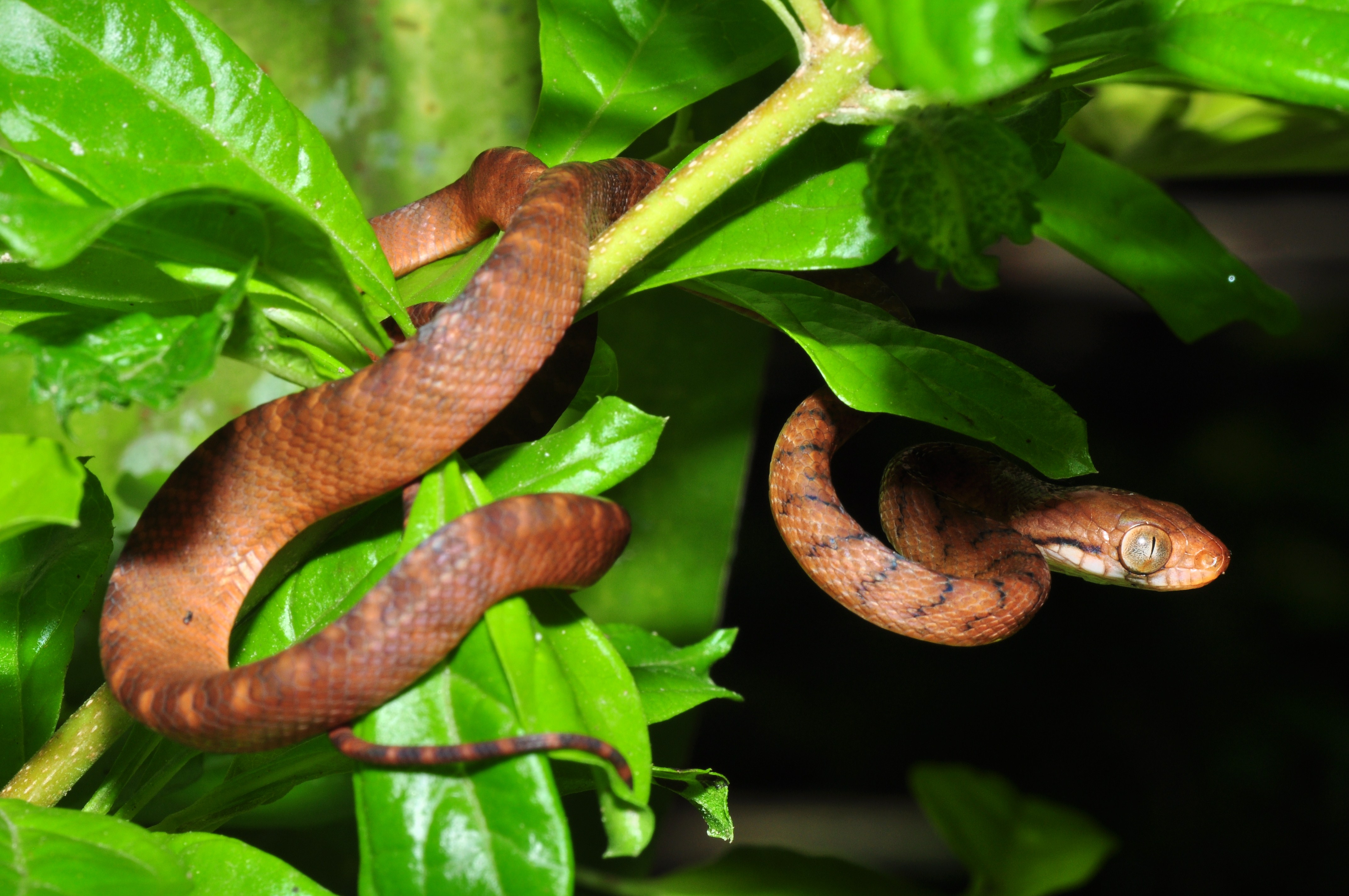
Brown tree snakes are bird predators that have been shown to be vulnerable to the poisons found in hooded pitohui.

A number of authors have noted that the two explanations, as a chemical defence against predators and as a chemical defence against ectoparasites, are not mutually exclusive, and evidence for both explanations exists. The fact that the highest concentrations of toxins are bound in the feathers of the breast and belly, in both pitohuis and ifrits, has caused scientists to suggest that the toxins rub off on eggs and nestlings providing protection against predators and nest parasites.

One argument in favour of the toxin acting as a defence against predators is the apparent Müllerian mimicry in some of the various unrelated pitohui species, which all have similar plumage. The species known as pitohuis were long thought congeneric, due to their similarities in plumage, but are now spread through three families, (Note: Or four, if the shrikethrushes are treated as a separate family, Colluricinclidae, from the whistlers.) the orioles, whistlers and Australo-Papuan bellbirds. The similarity in appearance therefore presumably evolved as a shared aposematic signal to common predators of their distasteful nature. This signal is reinforced by the species' strong sour odor. There is also evidence that some other birds in New Guinea have evolved Batesian mimicry, where a non-toxic species adopts the appearance of a toxic species. An example of this is the non-toxic juvenile greater melampitta, which has plumage similar to the hooded pitohui.

There have also been experiments to test pitohui batrachotoxins on potential predators. They have been shown to irritate the buccal membranes of brown tree snakes and green tree pythons, both of which are avian predators in New Guinea. The unpalatability of the species is also known to local hunters, who otherwise hunt songbirds of the same size.

The existence of resistance to batrachotoxins and the use of those toxins as chemical defences by several bird families have led to competing theories as to its evolutionary history. Jønsson (2008) suggested that it was an ancestral adaptation in Corvoidea songbirds, and that further studies would reveal more toxic birds. Dumbacher (2008) argued instead that it was an example of convergent evolution.

== Distribution and habitat ==
The hooded pitohui is endemic to the islands of New Guinea. It is found widely across the main island, and also on the nearby island of Yapen. It inhabits rainforest, forest edge habitats and secondary growth, and sometimes mangrove forests. It is most commonly found in hills and low mountains, between 350–1,700 m (1,150–5,580 ft), but is found locally down to sea-level and up to 2,000 m (6,600 ft). It typically occurs at higher elevations than the lowland variable pitohui and lower than the (unrelated) black pitohui, although there is some overlap.

== Behaviour ==
=== Calls ===
The hooded pitohui makes a variety of calls, mostly forms of whistles. Its song is a variable collection of three to seven whistles, which can slur up or down with hesitant pauses in between. Usually the song begins with two similar notes followed by an upslur. It also makes an "tuk tuk w'oh tuw'uow" call, two whistled "woiy, woiy" notes, two downslurred whistled "tiuw tow" notes, and three whistles "hui-whui-whooee", which increase in volume.

=== Diet and feeding ===
The diet of the hooded pitohui is dominated by fruit, particularly figs of the genus Ficus, grass seeds, some insects and other invertebrates, and possibly small vertebrates. Among the invertebrates found in their diet are beetles, spiders, earwigs, bugs (Hemiptera, including the families Membracidae and Lygaeidae), flies (Diptera), caterpillars and ants. They feed at all levels of the forest, from the forest floor to the canopy, and are reported to do so in small groups, presumably of related birds. The species also regularly joins mixed-species foraging flocks, and on Yapen and between 1,100–1,300 m (3,600–4,300 ft) above sea-level it will often act as the flock leader. This leadership role, and indeed their participation in mixed flocks, is not true across all of their range however.

=== Breeding ===
Little is known about the breeding biology of the hooded pitohui and its relatives due to the difficulties of studying the species high in the canopy of New Guinea. Nests with eggs of the hooded pitohui have been found from October through to February. The nest that has been described was 2 m (7 ft) off the ground. The nest is a cup of vine tendrils, lined with finer vines and suspended on thin branches.

The clutch is one to two eggs, 27 mm–32.8 mm × 20.5 mm–22.2 mm (1.06 in–1.29 in × 0.81 in–0.87 in), which are creamy or pinkish with brown to black spots and blotches and faint grey patches; in one egg all the markings with at the larger end. The incubation period is not known, but the species is thought to be a cooperative breeder, as more than two birds in a group have been observed defending the nest from intruders and feeding the young. Young birds, which are covered in white down as nestlings before developing their adult plumage, have been observed being fed acorn-shaped red berries and insects. Young birds will make a threat display when approached in the nest, rising up and erecting their head feathers. As chicks develop directly into adult plumage, it has been suggested that this display may be signalling its identity as a toxic species, even though young birds have not developed toxicity at that age.

== Relationship with humans ==
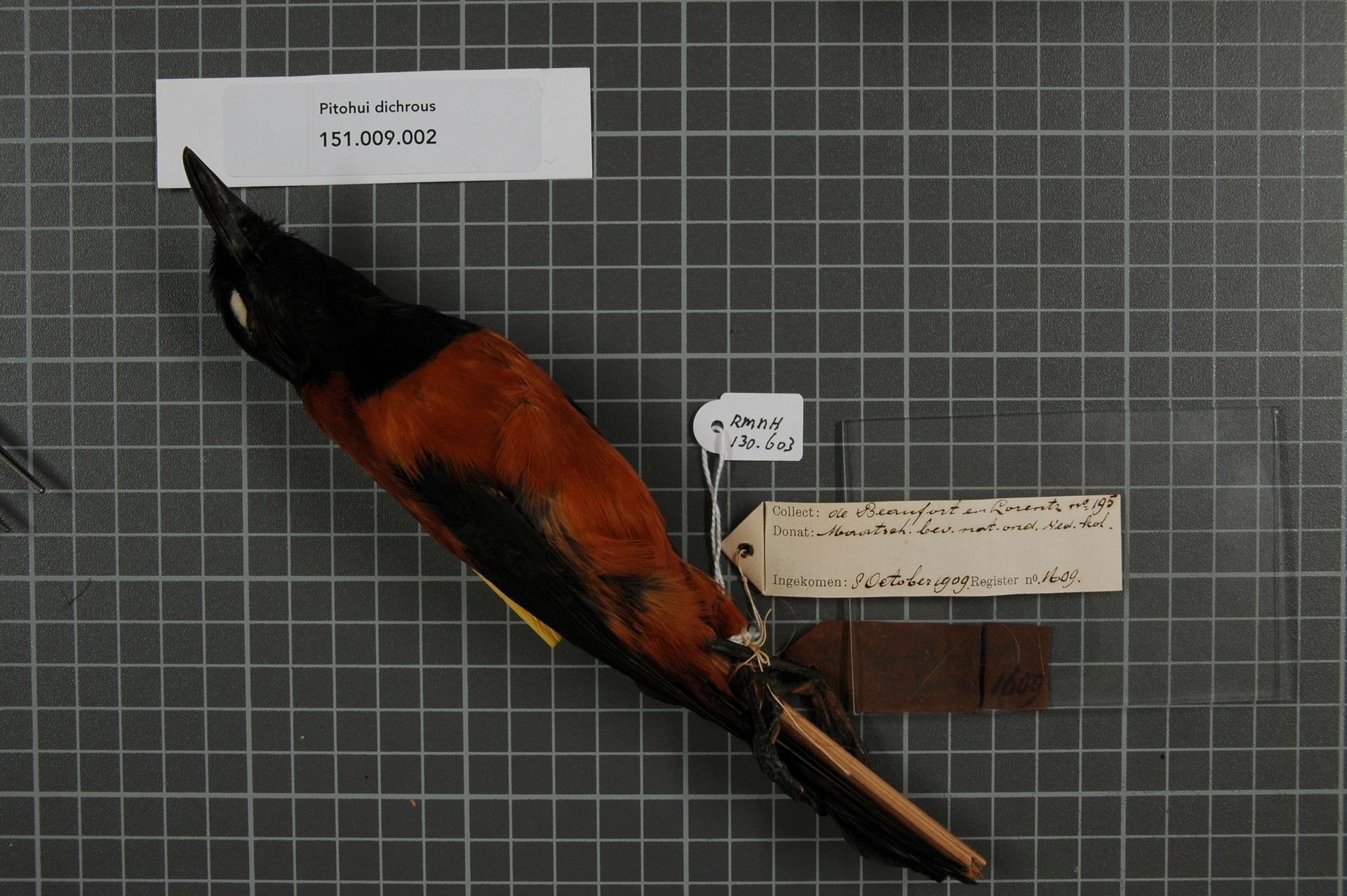
The preparation of study skins for museums led to the discovery of toxins in the skins of hooded pitohui.

The toxic and unpalatable nature of the hooded pitohui has long been known to local people in New Guinea, and this knowledge has been recorded by Western scientists as far back as 1895. In spite of this, and reports of toxicity in birds going back to classic antiquity, before the discovery that the hooded pitohui was toxic, toxicity was not a trait that scientists attributed to birds. The discovery of toxicity in birds, triggered by this species, sparked interest in the subject and a re-examination of older accounts of unpalatability and toxicity in birds, although the field is still understudied.

=== Status and conservation ===
Common and widespread throughout New Guinea, the hooded pitohui is evaluated as a species of least concern on the IUCN Red List of Threatened Species. In one study of the effects of small subsistence gardens, populations of hooded pitohui were lower in disturbed agricultural habitat in the lowlands, compared to undisturbed forest, but actually increased in disturbed habitat higher in the mountains.
