= Müllerian mimicry =

Mutually beneficial mimicry of strongly defended species

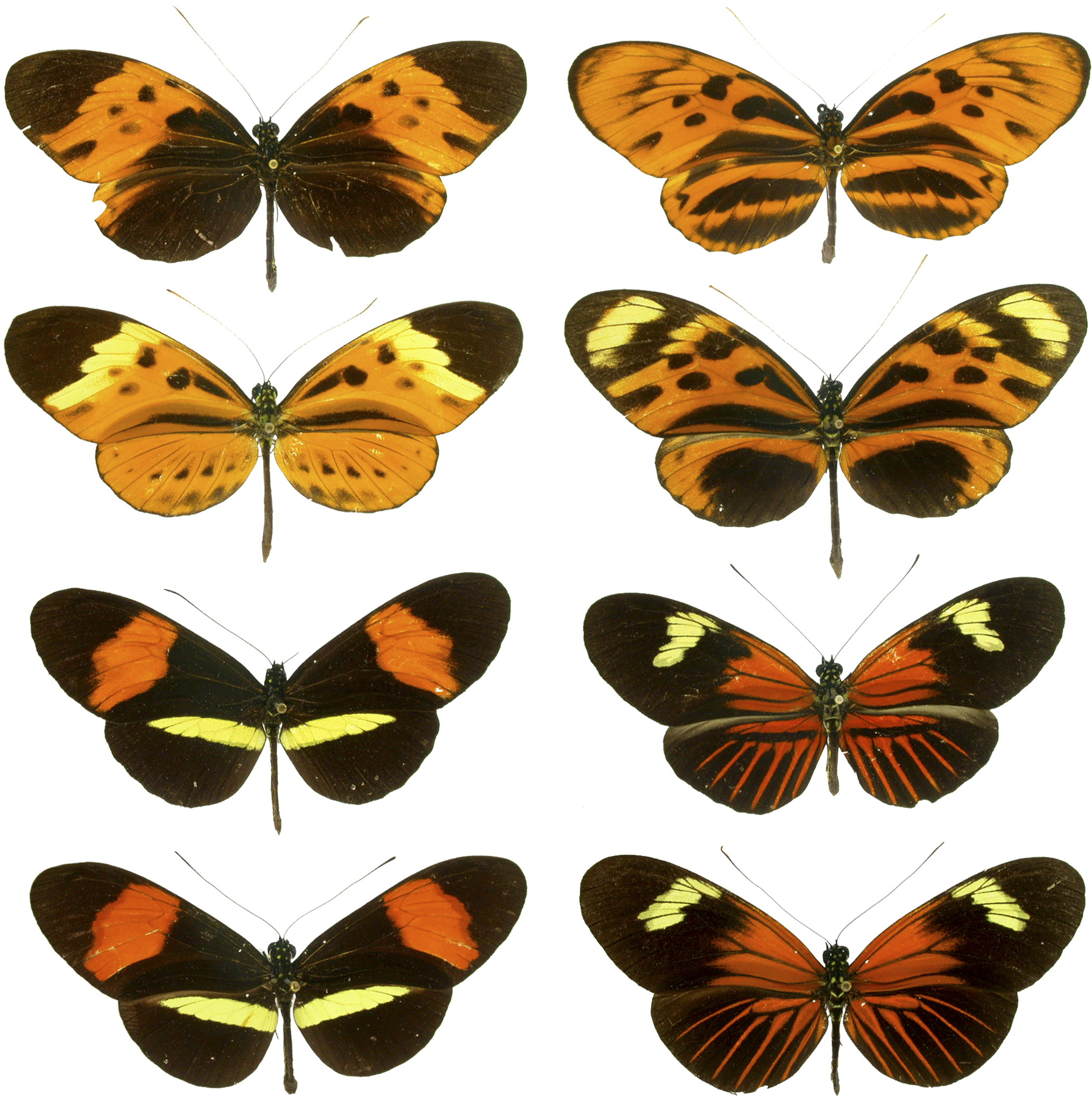
Müllerian mimicry in Heliconius butterflies: In this image, four forms of Heliconius numata mimic two species with multiple forms in different regions (H. melpomene (row 3) and H. erato (row 4), which mimic each other.

Müllerian mimicry is a type of biological mimicry in which two or more well-defended species, often foul-tasting and sharing common predators, converge in appearance to mimic each other's honest warning signals. This convergence of appearance achieves the following benefit to species that undergo it: predators need only experience a single unpleasant encounter with any member of a set of Müllerian mimics in order to thereafter avoid all creatures of similar appearance, whether or not it is the same species as the initial encounter. A ring of distinct species is thereby protected from their mutual predators by attempted predation upon any one of its members. The phenomenon is named after the German-Brazilian naturalist Fritz Müller, who proposed the concept in 1878, supporting his theory with a mathematical model of frequency-dependent selection, one of the first such models to be deployed in biology. (Note: Thomas Malthus's use of tables of numbers illustrating the limits to human population growth is one of the few earlier uses of a mathematical argument that could be called a model.)

Müllerian mimicry was first identified in tropical butterflies that shared colourful wing patterns, but it is found in many groups of insects such as bumblebees, as well as in other animals such as poison frogs and coral snakes. The mimicry need not be restricted to that detected by vision—many snakes share auditory warning signals. Similarly, the defences involved are not limited to toxicity—anything that tends to deter predators, such as foul taste, sharp spines, or defensive behaviour can make a species unprofitable enough to predators to allow Müllerian mimicry to develop.

Once a pair of Müllerian mimics has formed other mimics may join them by advergent evolution (one species changing to conform to the appearance of the pair, rather than mutual convergence), forming mimicry rings. Large rings are found among the several thousand species of velvet ants (which are all, in fact, types of wasp). Because the frequency of mimics in a given environment is positively correlated with an individual mimic's survival, the rarer mimics come to resemble the commoner models, favouring both advergence and ever-larger rings of Müllerian mimicry. Where Müllerian mimics are not strongly protected by venom or other defences, honest Müllerian mimicry transforms incrementally into the better-known bluffing of Batesian mimicry.

== History ==
=== Origins ===
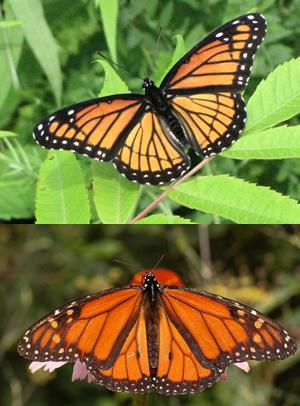
The viceroy butterfly (top) appears similar to the noxious-tasting monarch butterfly (bottom). Although it was purported to be an example of Batesian mimicry, the viceroy has been discovered to be just as unpalatable as the monarch, making this a case of Müllerian mimicry.

Müllerian mimicry was proposed by Fritz Müller (1821–1897). An early proponent of evolution, Müller offered the first explanation for resemblance between certain butterflies that had puzzled the English naturalist Henry Walter Bates in 1862. Bates, like Müller, spent a significant fraction of his life in Brazil, which Bates described in his book The Naturalist on the River Amazons. Bates conjectured that these abundant and distasteful butterflies might have been caused to resemble each other by their physical environment. Müller had also seen these butterflies first hand and, like Bates, had collected specimens. Müller proposed a variety of other explanations. One was sexual selection—that individuals would choose to mate with partners with frequently-seen coloration, such as those resembling other species. However, if as is usual, females are the choosers, then mimicry would be seen in males, but in sexually dimorphic species, females are more often mimetic. Another was, as Müller wrote in 1878, that "defended species may evolve a similar appearance so as to share the costs of predator education."

=== Müller's mathematical model ===
Müller's 1879 account was the earliest use of a mathematical model in evolutionary ecology, and the first exact model of frequency-dependent selection. Mallet calls Müller's mathematical assumption behind the model "beguilingly simple". Müller presumed that the predators had to attack n unprofitable prey in a summer to experience and learn their warning coloration. Calling a_{1} and a_{2} the total numbers of two unprofitable prey species, Müller then argued that, if the species are completely unalike they each lose n individuals. However, if they resemble each other,

then species 1 loses a_{1}n/(a_{1}+a_{2}) individuals, and species 2 loses a_{2}n/(a_{1}+a_{2}) individuals.

Species 1 therefore gains n-a_{1}n/(a_{1}+a_{2}) = a_{2}n/(a_{1}+a_{2}) and species 2 similarly gains a_{1}n/(a_{1}+a_{2}) in absolute numbers of individuals not killed.

The proportional gain compared to the total population of species 1 is g_{1} = a_{2}n/(a_{1}(a_{1}+a_{2})) and similarly for species 2 g_{2} = a_{1}n/(a_{2}(a_{1}+a_{2})), giving the per head fitness gain of the mimicry when the predators have been fully educated.

Hence, Müller concluded, the proportion g1:g2 was a_{2}/a_{1} : a_{1}/a_{2}, which equals a_{2}^{2}:a_{1}^{2}, and the rarer species gains far more than the commoner one.

The model is an approximation, and assumes the species are equally unprofitable. Later models are more complex. If one is more distasteful than the other, then the relative gains differ further, the less distasteful species benefiting more (as a square of the relative distastefulness) from the protection afforded by mimicry. Some have argued that some "Müllerian" mimicry may be "quasi-Batesian", or parasitic, rather than mutualistic. In "quasi-Batesian" mimicry, a weakly unpalatable species is proposed to gain protection from mimicry, while the strongly protected "model" species it mimics suffers greater predation as a result of the weakening of the average distastefulness of the mimetic pair. The assumption of a fixed number n to be attacked is a useful first step, but unlikely to perfectly reflect the effect of predators' memories. Müller also effectively assumed a step function, when a gradual change (a functional response) is more plausible.

=== Non-deceitful mimicry ===
Biologists have not always viewed the Müllerian mechanism as mimicry, both because the term was strongly associated with Batesian mimicry, and because no deception was involved—unlike the situation in Batesian mimicry, the aposematic signals given by Müllerian mimics are (unconsciously) honest. Earlier terms, no longer in use, for Müllerian mimicry included "homotypy", "nondeceitful homotypy" and "arithmetic homotypy".

Batesian vs Müllerian mimicry: the former is deceptive, the latter honest.

== Evolution ==
=== Aposematism, camouflage, and mimicry ===
Müllerian mimicry relies on aposematism, or warning signals. Dangerous organisms with these honest signals are avoided by predators, which quickly learn after a bad experience not to pursue the same unprofitable prey again. Learning is not actually necessary for animals which instinctively avoid certain prey; however, learning from experience is more common. The underlying concept with predators that learn is that the warning signal makes the harmful organism easier to remember than if it remained as well camouflaged as possible. Aposematism and camouflage are in this way opposing concepts, but this does not mean they are mutually exclusive. Many animals remain inconspicuous until threatened, then suddenly employ warning signals, such as startling eyespots, bright colours on their undersides or loud vocalizations. In this way, they enjoy the best of both strategies. These strategies may also be employed differentially throughout development. For instance, large white butterflies are aposematic as larvae, but are Müllerian mimics once they emerge from development as adult butterflies.

=== Selective advantage ===
Many different prey of the same predator could all employ their own warning signals, but this would make no sense for any party. If they could all agree on a common warning signal, the predator would have fewer detrimental experiences, and the prey would lose fewer individuals educating it. No such conference needs to take place, as a prey species that just so happens to look a little like an unprofitable (Note: Unprofitability may consist of anything which makes prey not worth a predator's while to eat. Unpalatability on grounds of toxicity or foul taste is a common mechanism, but defences may include sharp spines; an aggressive nature; agility or speed in escape rendering the prey costly to catch; foul smell, and so on.) species will be safer than its conspecifics, enabling natural selection to drive the prey species toward a single warning language. This can lead to the evolution of both Batesian and Müllerian mimicry, depending on whether the mimic is itself unprofitable to its predators, or just a free-rider. Multiple species can join the protective cooperative, expanding the mimicry ring. Müller thus provided an explanation for Bates' paradox; the mimicry was not, in his view, a case of exploitation by one species, but rather a mutualistic arrangement, though his mathematical model indicated a pronounced asymmetry.

=== Relationship to Batesian mimicry ===
Comparison of Batesian and Müllerian mimicry, illustrated with a hoverfly, a wasp and a bee

The Müllerian strategy is usually contrasted with Batesian mimicry, in which one harmless species adopts the appearance of an unprofitable species to gain the advantage of predators' avoidance; Batesian mimicry is thus in a sense parasitic on the model's defences, whereas Müllerian is to mutual benefit. However, because comimics may have differing degrees of protection, the distinction between Müllerian and Batesian mimicry is not absolute, and there can be said to be a spectrum between the two forms.

Viceroy butterflies and monarchs (types of admiral butterfly) are both poisonous Müllerian mimics, though they were long thought to be Batesian. Mitochondrial DNA analysis of admiral butterflies shows that the viceroy is sister to two western sister species in North America. The variation in wing patterns appears to have preceded the evolution of toxicity, while other species remain non-toxic, refuting the hypothesis that the toxicity of these butterflies is a conserved characteristic from a common ancestor.

=== Non-visual mimicry ===
Müllerian mimicry need not involve visual mimicry; it may employ any of the senses. For example, many snakes share the same auditory warning signals, forming an auditory Müllerian mimicry ring. More than one signal may be shared: snakes can make use of both auditory signals and warning coloration.

=== Negative frequency-dependent selection ===
There is a negative correlation between the frequency of mimics and the "survivability" of both species involved. This implies that it is reproductively beneficial for both species if the models outnumber the mimics; this increases the negative interactions between predator and prey.

=== Genetics ===
Some insight into the evolution of mimetic color mimicry in Lepidoptera in particular can be seen through the study of the Optix gene. The Optix gene is responsible for the Heliconius butterflies' signature red wing patterns that help it signal to predators that it is toxic. By sharing this coloration with other poisonous red winged butterflies the predator may have pursued previously, the Heliconius butterfly increases its chance of survival through association. By mapping the genome of many related species of Heliconius butterflies "show[s] that the cis-regulatory evolution of a single transcription factor can repeatedly drive the convergent evolution of complex color patterns in distantly related species…". This suggests that the evolution of a non-coding piece of DNA that regulates the transcription of nearby genes can be the reason behind similar phenotypic coloration between distant species, making it hard to determine if the trait is homologous or simply the result of convergent evolution.

=== Two step evolution ===
One proposed mechanism for Müllerian mimicry is the "two step hypothesis". This states that a large mutational leap initially establishes an approximate resemblance of the mimic to the model, both species already being aposematic. In a second step, smaller changes establish a closer resemblance. This is only likely to work, however, when a trait is governed by a single gene, and many coloration patterns are certainly controlled by multiple genes.

=== Advergence versus mutualism ===
Formation of Müllerian mimicry rings by a process of advergence of one species or pair of mimics to another, presumably larger or more abundant. Evolution is shown on two axes denoting phenotypes for convenience; in practice there would be any number of dimensions (e.g. coloration features). The model predicts a single mimicry ring in an area, but this is not the case in Heliconius butterflies.

The mimic poison frog Ranitomeya (Dendrobates) imitator is polymorphic, with a striped morph that imitates the black and yellow striped morph of Ranitomeya variabilis, a spotted morph that imitates the largely blue-green highland spotted morph also of R. variabilis, and a banded morph that imitates the red and black banded Ranitomeya summersi.

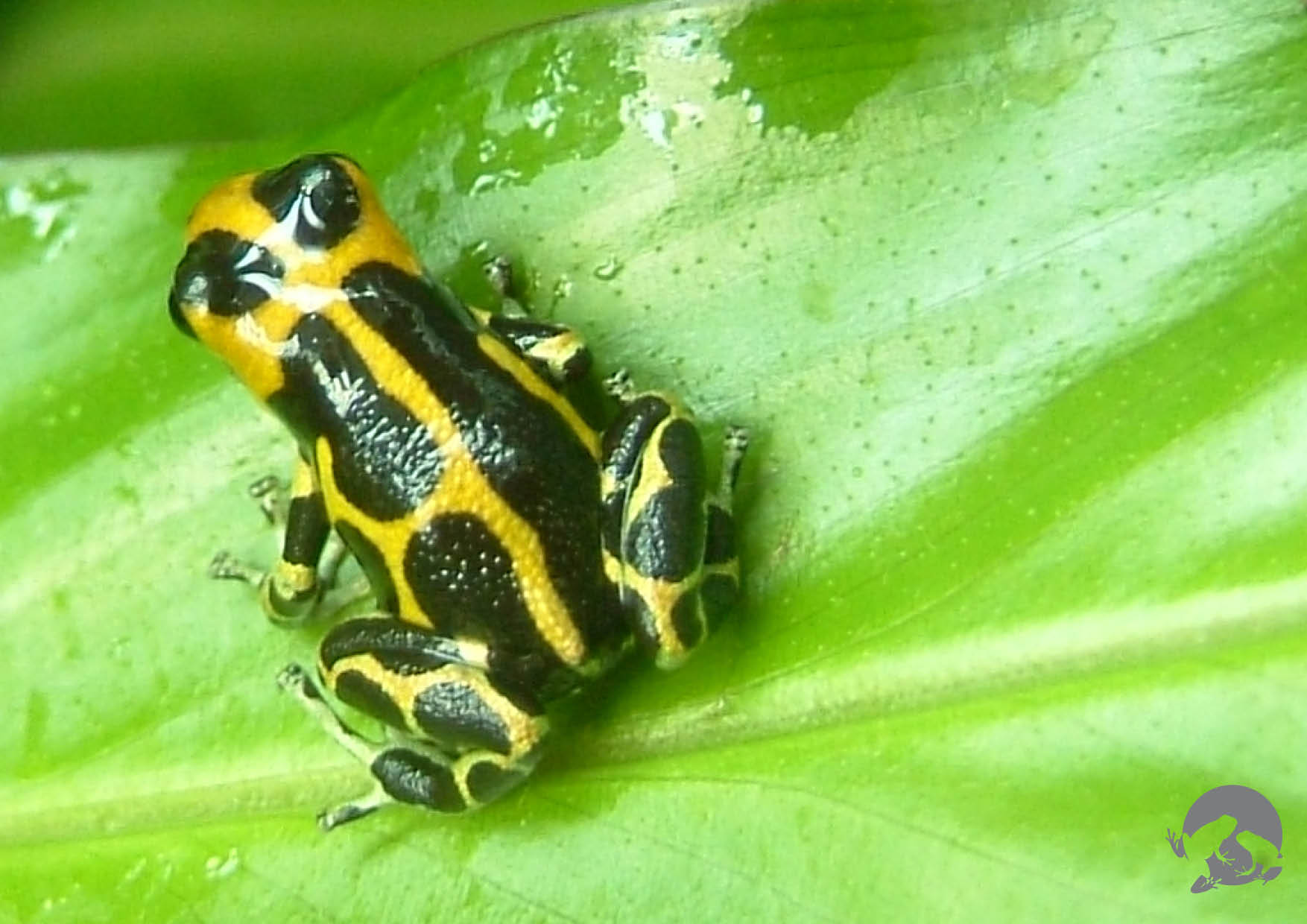
A common morph of Ranitomeya (Dendrobates) imitator is aposematically striped black and yellow, but in other areas, other morphs imitate differently coloured species.

R. imitator has thus apparently evolved in separate populations to resemble different targets, i.e. it has changed to resemble (adverged on) those target species, rather than both R. imitator and the other species mutually converging in the way that Müller supposed for tropical butterflies.

Such advergence may be common. The mechanism was proposed by the entomologist F. A. Dixey in 1909 and has remained controversial; the evolutionary biologist James Mallet, reviewing the situation in 2001, suggested that in Müllerian mimicry, advergence may be more common than convergence. In advergent evolution, the mimicking species responds to predation by coming to resemble the model more and more closely. Any initial benefit is thus to the mimic, and there is no implied mutualism, as there would be with Müller's original convergence theory. However, once model and mimic have become closely similar, some degree of mutual protection becomes likely. This theory would predict that all mimicking species in an area should converge on a single pattern of coloration. This does not appear to happen in nature, however, as Heliconius butterflies form multiple Müllerian mimicry rings in a single geographical area. The finding implies that additional evolutionary forces are probably at work.

=== Mimicry complexes ===
Many familiar bumblebees are Müllerian mimics, with effective stings and similar warning coloration

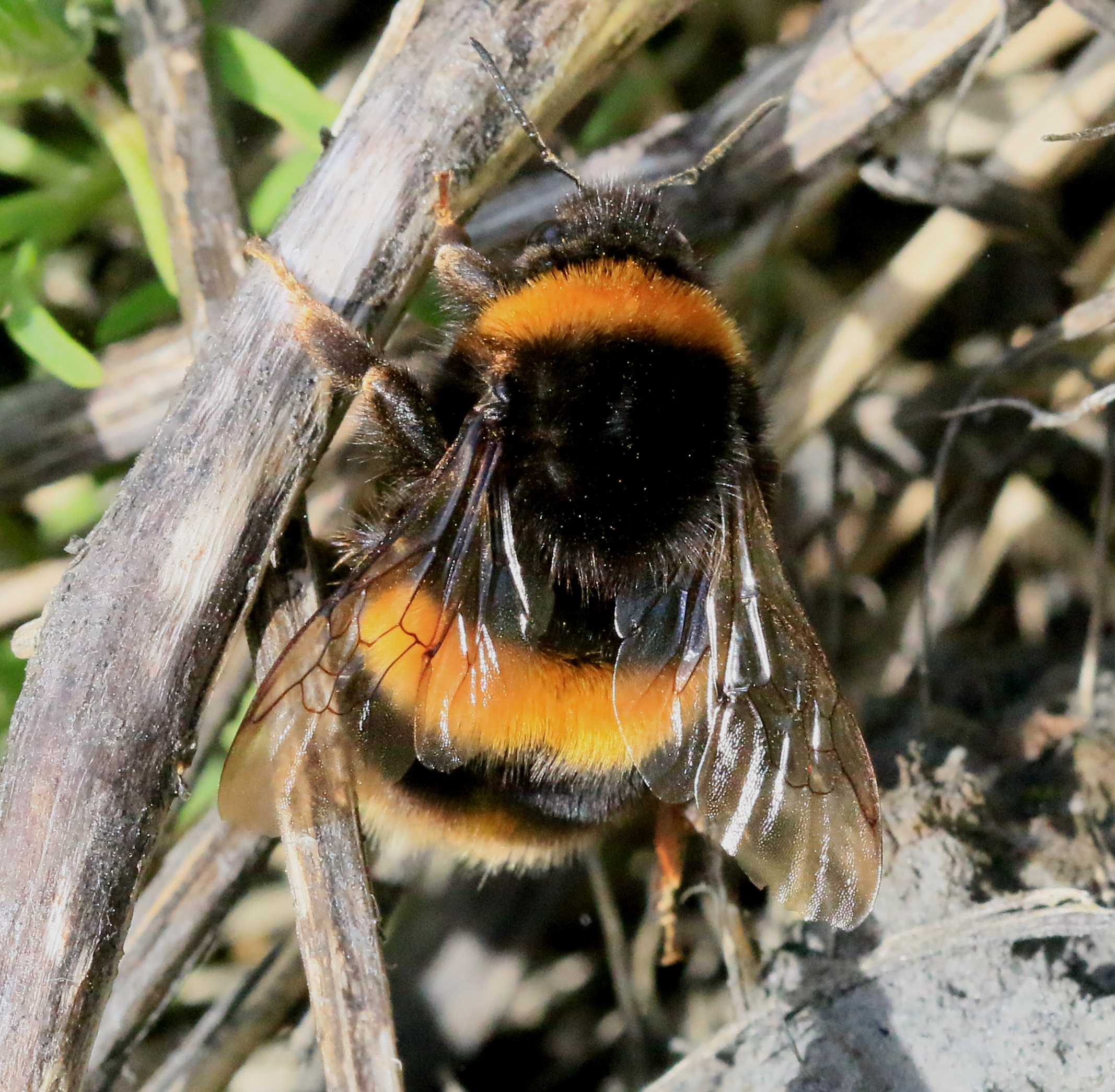
Bombus terrestris

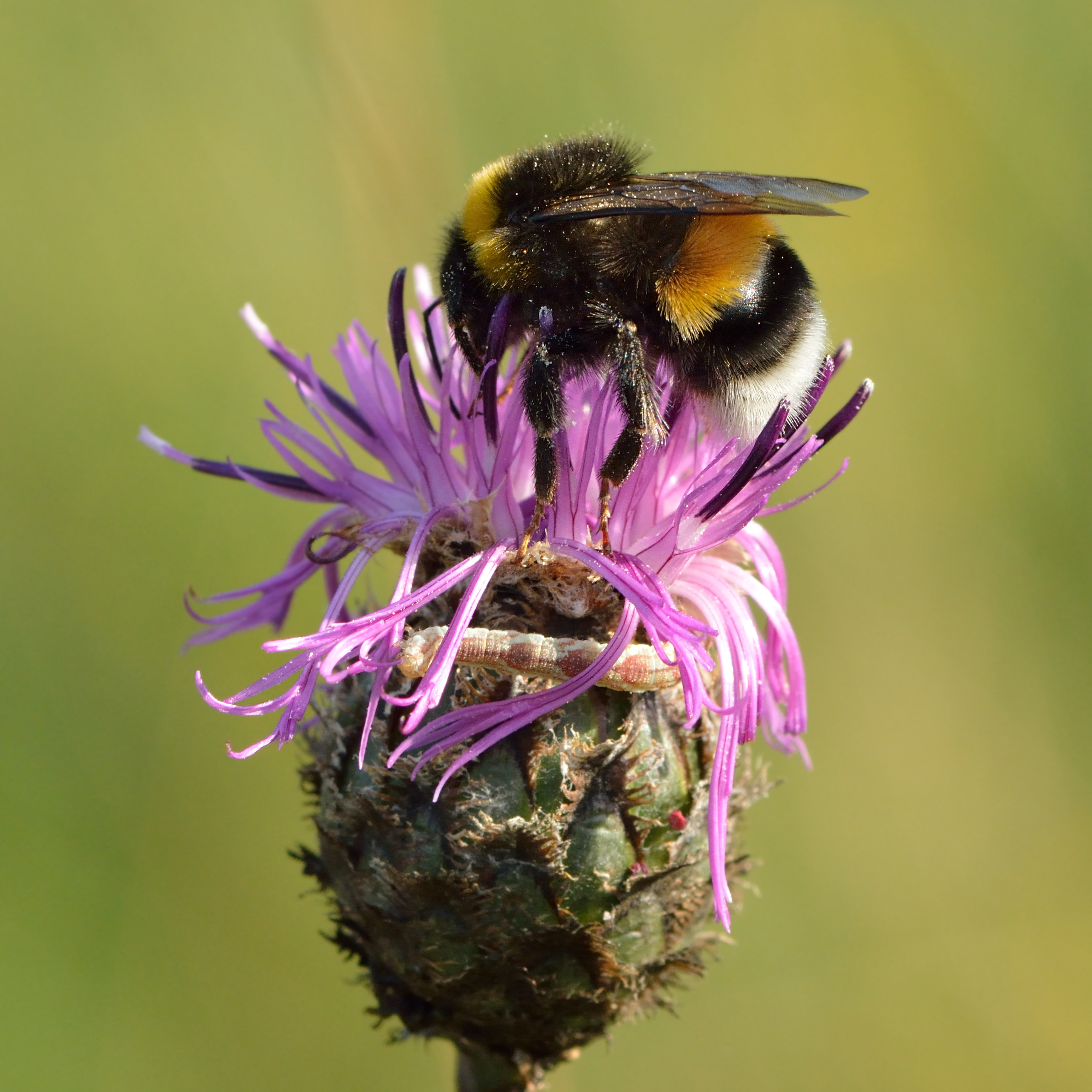
Bombus lucorum

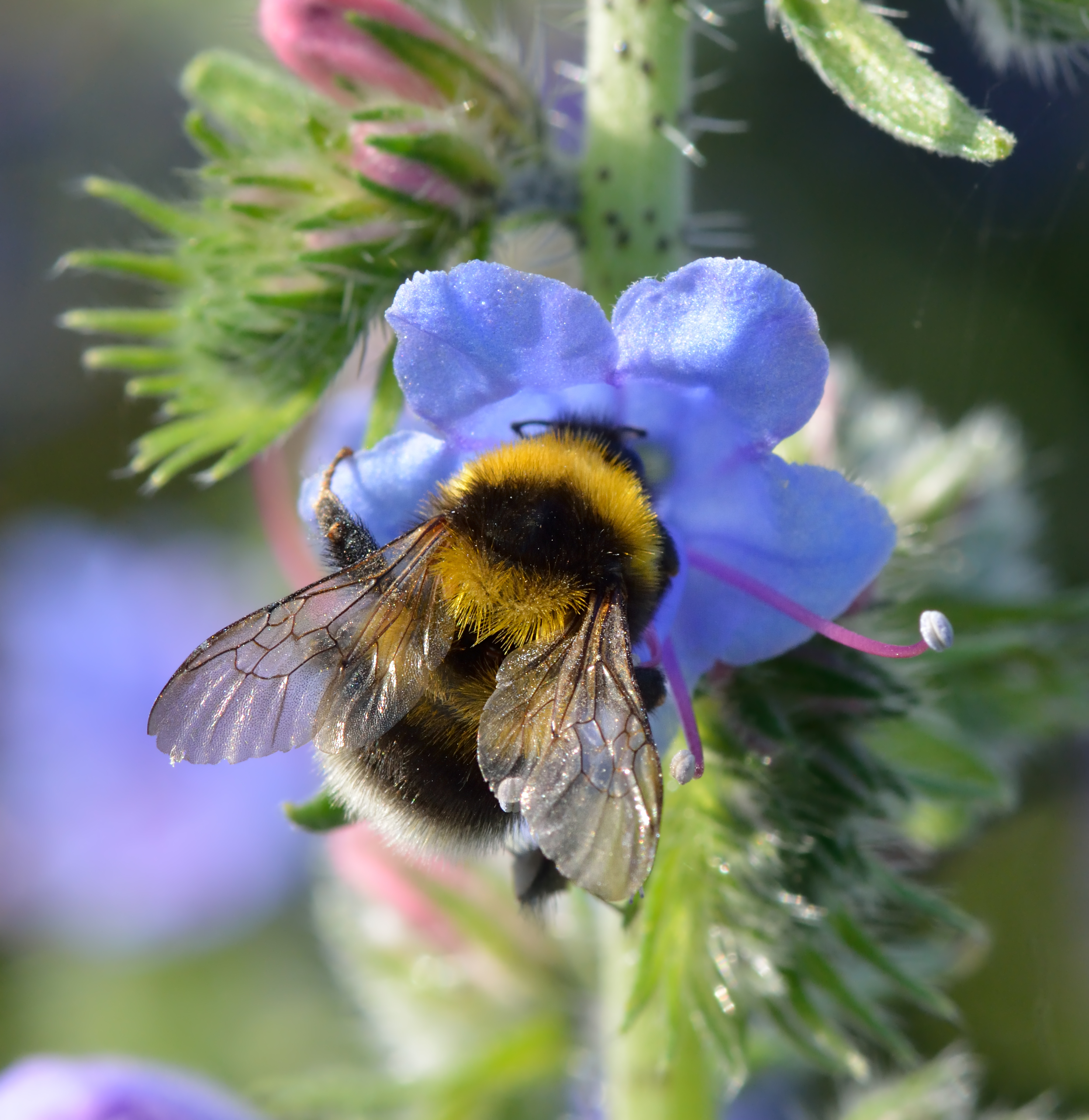
Bombus hortorum

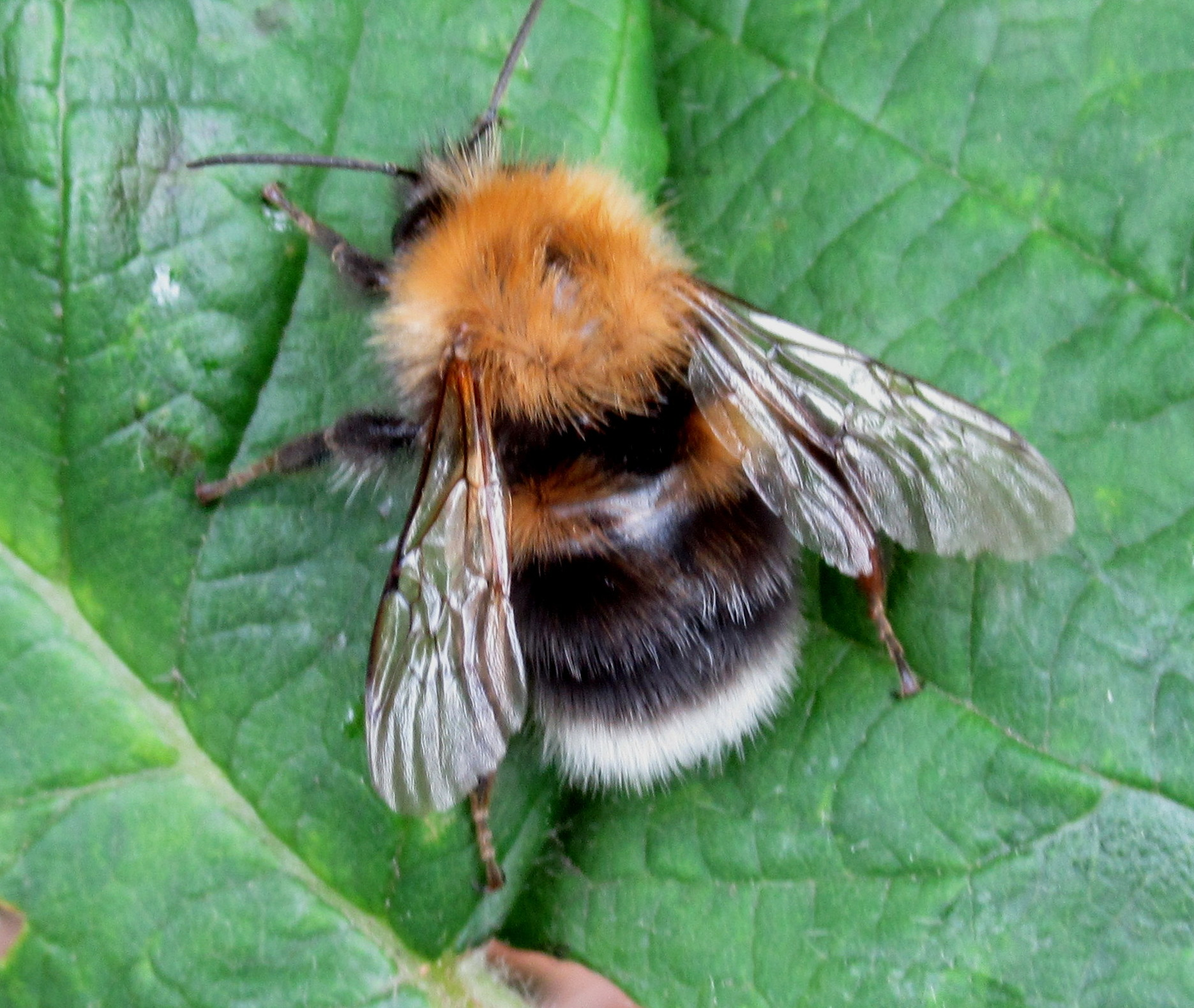
Bombus hypnorum

Müllerian mimicry often occurs in clusters of multiple species called rings. Müllerian mimicry is not limited to butterflies, where rings are common; mimicry rings occur among Hymenoptera, such as bumblebees, and other insects, and among vertebrates including fish and coral snakes. Bumblebees Bombus are all aposematically coloured in combinations, often stripes, of black, white, yellow, and red; and all their females have stings, (Note: Drones have no sting, but similar patterns, and may (more or less accidentally) benefit from automimicry of females of their own species.) so they are certainly unprofitable to predators. There is evidence that several species of bumblebees in each of several areas of the world, namely the American West and East coasts, Western Europe, and Kashmir, have converged or adverged on mutually mimetic coloration patterns. Each of these areas has one to four mimicry rings, with patterns different from those in other areas.

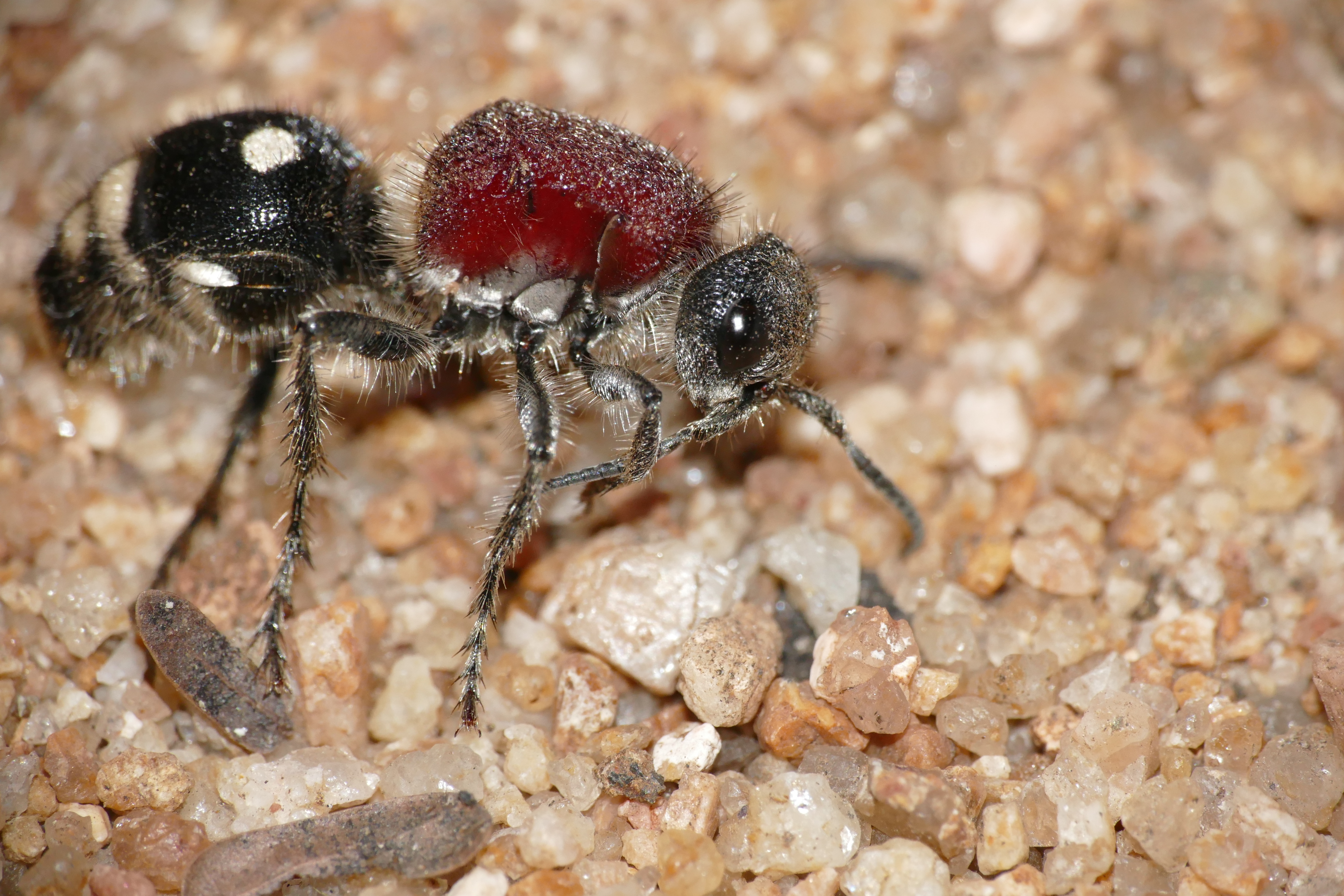
Many species of North American velvet ants in the genus Dasymutilla are involved in mimicry complexes.

The relationships among mimics can become complex. For example, the poison fangblenny Meiacanthus spp. have hollow canines and poison glands, and are avoided by predatory fish. The blenny Plagiotremus townsendi resembles Meiacanthus and is eaten by a variety of predators, so it is a Batesian mimic in their case: but it is avoided by the lionfish, Pterois volitans, making it also a Müllerian mimic.

Sets of associated rings are called complexes. Large complexes are known among the North American velvet ants in the genus Dasymutilla. Out of 351 species examined in one study, 336 had morphological similarities, apparently forming 8 distinct mimetic rings; 65 species in another study appeared to form six rings separable by both morphology and geography.

== Taxonomic range ==
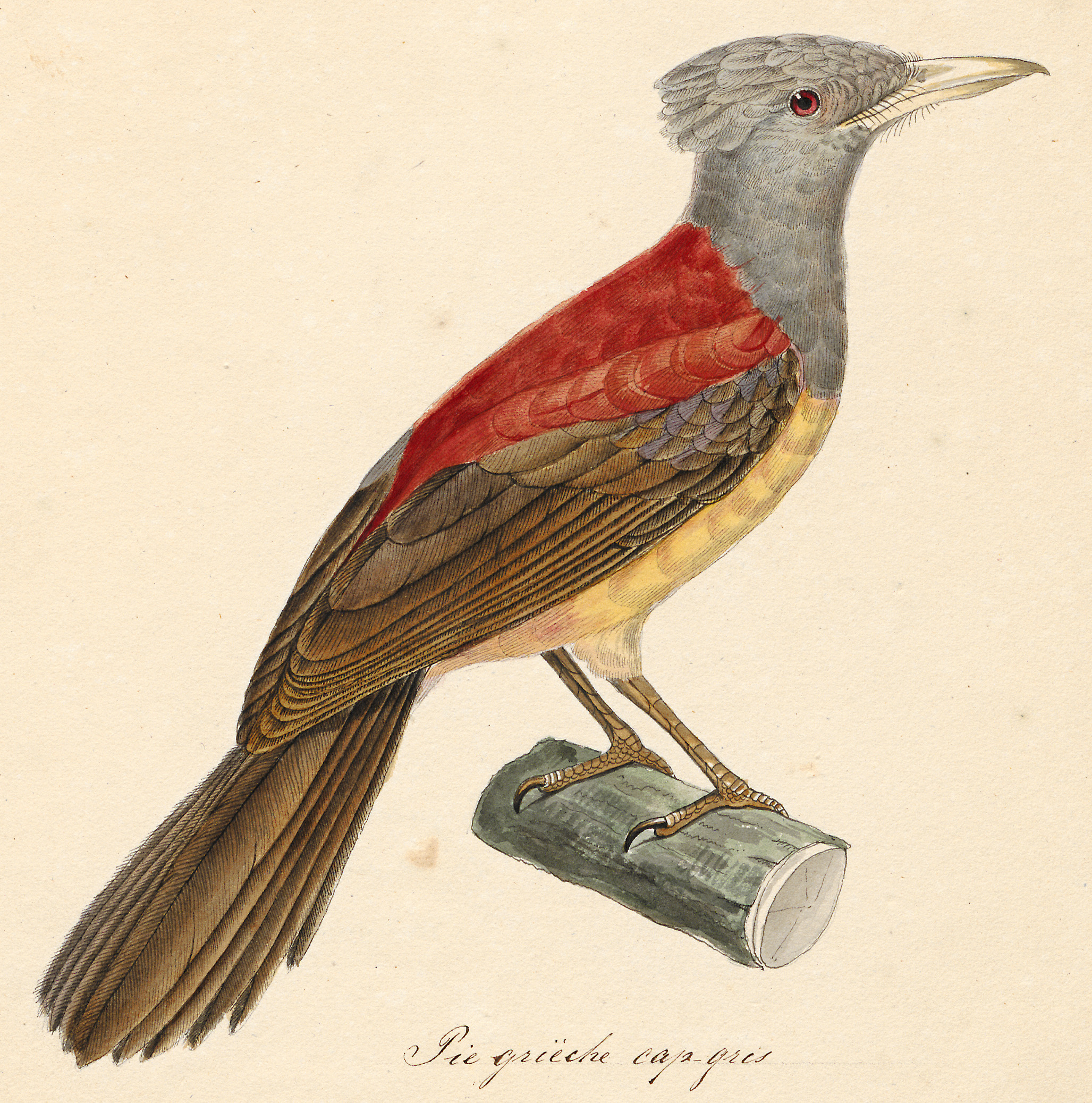
Pitohui kirhocephalus, from Duperrey, 1825–1839, appears to be a Müllerian mimic of Pitohui dichrous in some of its plumage types.

Müllerian mimicry was discovered and has mainly been researched in insects. However, there is no reason why the mechanism's evolutionary advantages should not be exploited in other groups. There is some evidence that birds in the New Guinea genus Pitohui are Müllerian mimics. Pitohui dichrous and Pitohui kirhocephalus "share a nearly identical colour pattern" where their geographic ranges overlap, but differ elsewhere; they are conspicuous; and they are chemically defended by a powerful neurotoxic alkaloid, batrachotoxin, in their feathers and skin. This combination of facts implies that the populations in these zones of overlap have converged to share honest warning signals.

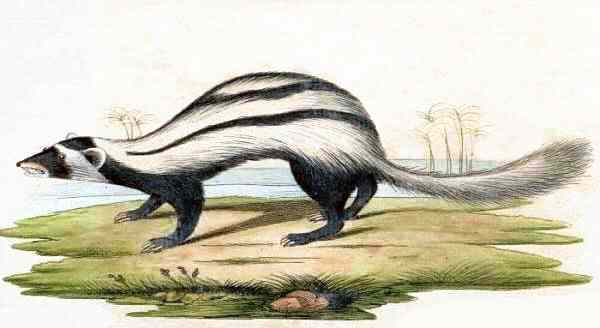
Several mammals including the Saharan striped polecat, Ictonyx libycus, are aggressive, aposematically coloured predators. They share black-and-white patterns, suggesting Müllerian mimicry.

Many species of flowers resemble each other but actual mimicry has not been demonstrated. It has been proposed that spiny plants such as Cactaceae and Agave in the Americas, Aloe, Euphorbia, white-thorned Acacia in Africa and spiny Asteraceae of the Mediterranean may form Müllerian mimicry rings, as they are strongly defended, are generally agreed to be aposematic, have similar conspicuous patterns and coloration, and are found in overlapping territories.

Aposematic mammals in the families Mustelidae, Viverridae, and Herpestidae have independently evolved conspicuous black-and-white coloration, suggesting that Müllerian mimicry may be involved.

== In marketing ==
The evolutionary zoologist Thomas N. Sherratt suggests that different types of mimicry occur in brand and product marketing. He notes that distinctive forms like the Coca-Cola bottle's shape are defended by businesses, whereas rival companies have often imitated such famous motifs to benefit from the investment and reputation of their well-known competitors, constituting Batesian mimicry. Sherratt observes that the packaging of British supermarket own brands of potato crisps are consistently colour-coded red for the ready-salted variety, green for salt and vinegar, and blue for cheese and onion, (Note: Sherratt notes that this use of red is shared with Walker's crisps, whereas the uses of blue and green are interchanged with respect to Walker's.) across the major chains Sainsbury's, Tesco, Asda, and Waitrose. He argues that this sharing of the pattern is very unlikely to have arisen by chance, in which case the resemblance is intentionally to inform customers reliably (honest signalling) of what each package contains, to mutual benefit in the manner of Müllerian mimicry.

== Sources ==
- Edmunds, M. (1974). Defence in Animals. Longmans. ISBN 978-0-582-44132-3.
- Forbes, Peter (2009). Dazzled and Deceived: Mimicry and Camouflage. Yale University Press. ISBN 978-0-300-17896-8.
- Ruxton, Graeme; Speed, M. P.; Sherratt, T. N. (2004). Avoiding Attack. The Evolutionary Ecology of Crypsis, Warning Signals and Mimicry. Oxford University Press. ISBN 978-0-19-852860-9. Chapters 9 and 11 provide an overview.
