= Brown pitohui =

Brown pitohui may refer to either of two species of passerine bird:

- Morningbird (Pachycephala tenebrosa), endemic to Palau
- White-bellied pitohui (Pseudorectes incertus), endemic to New Guinea
