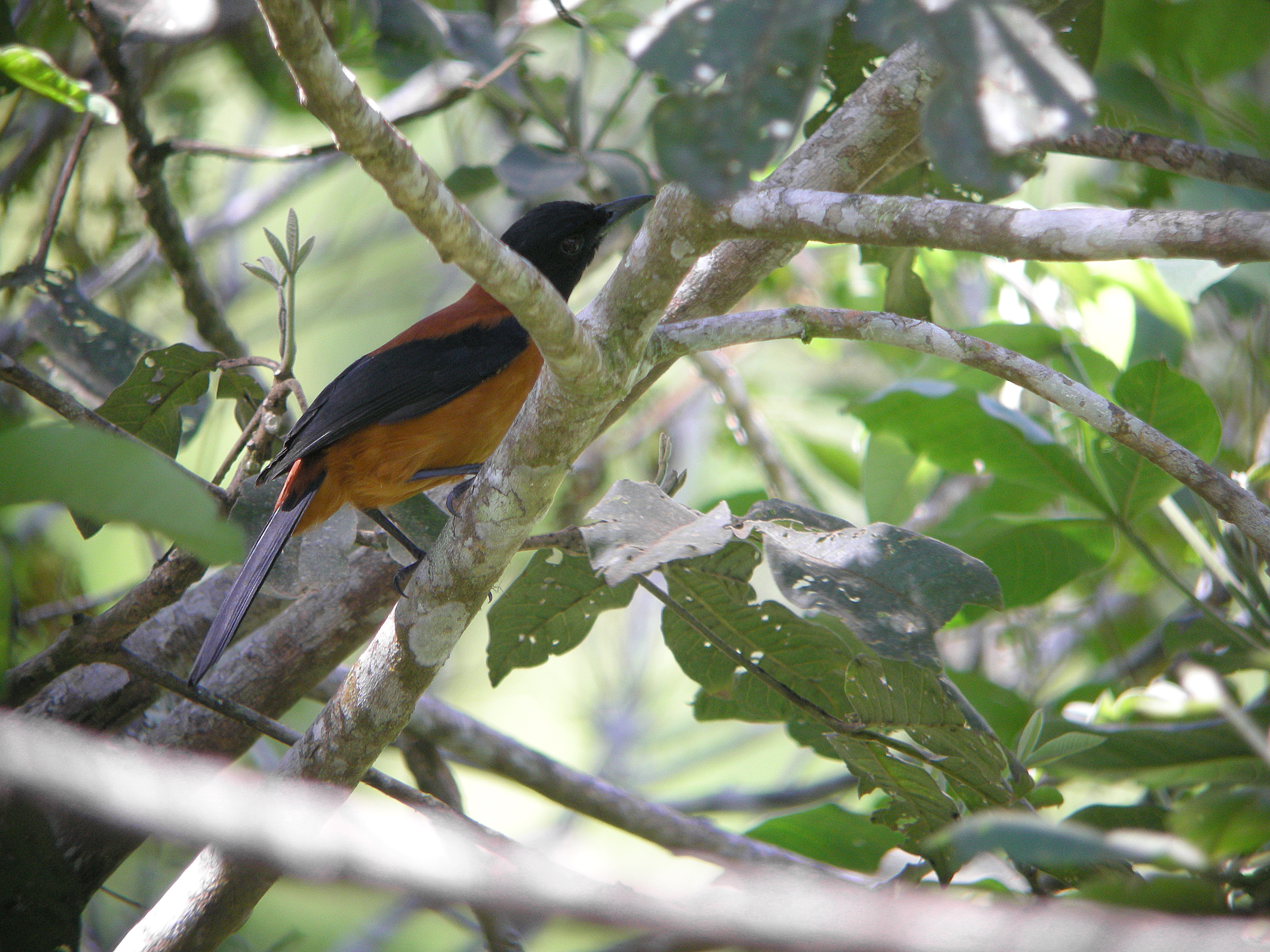
- Hooded pitohui (Pitohui dichrous)

Scientific classification
- Kingdom: Animalia
- Phylum: Chordata
- Class: Aves
- Order: Passeriformes
- Family: Oriolidae
- Genus: Pitohui; Lesson, 1831

Type species
- Lanius kirhocephalus (Northern variable pitohui) Lesson & Garnot, 1827

Species
- See text.

Synonyms
- Rectes; Rhectes

= Pitohui (genus) =

Genus of birds

Pitohui is a genus of birds endemic to New Guinea. The birds formerly lumped together as pitohuis were found by a 2008 study that examined their evolutionary history on the basis of the genetic sequences to have included birds that were quite unrelated to each other. They have since been separated into other genera.

== Taxonomy and systematics ==
The genus Pitohui was introduced in 1831 by the French naturalist René Lesson. Lesson omitted to specify the type species but this was designated as the northern variable pitohui by Richard Bowdler Sharpe in 1877. The genus name is a Papuan word for the variable pitohui.

The common group name pitohui includes several species of birds that were all historically classified in the genus Pitohui. But now they have been separated into three families and multiple genera. The genus Pitohui in its strict sense is now placed in the family Oriolidae, while the other pitohui genera have been placed in the families Oreoicidae and Pachycephalidae.

=== Species ===
Four species are recognized in the revised genus Pitouhi:

Image	Common name	Scientific name	Distribution
	Northern variable pitohui	Pitohui kirhocephalus	New Guinea
	Raja Ampat pitohui	Pitohui cerviniventris	western Papuan Islands of New Guinea.
	Southern variable pitohui	Pitohui uropygialis	New Guinea
	Hooded pitohui	Pitohui dichrous	New Guinea.

=== Former species ===
Species that were formerly sometimes placed in the genus Pitohui include the following:

- Crested pitohui (Ornorectes cristatus, Family Oreoicidae, formerly placed as Pitohui cristatus)
- Black pitohui (Melanorectes nigrescens, Family Pachycephalidae, formerly placed as Pitohui nigrescens)
- White-bellied pitohui (Pseudorectes incertus, Family Pachycephalidae, formerly placed as Pitohui incertus)
- Rusty pitohui (Pseudorectes ferrugineus, Family Pachycephalidae, formerly placed as Pitohui ferrugineus)
- Morningbird (Pachycephala tenebrosa, Family Pachycephalidae, formerly placed as Pitohui tenebrosus or as Colluricincla tenebrosa)
