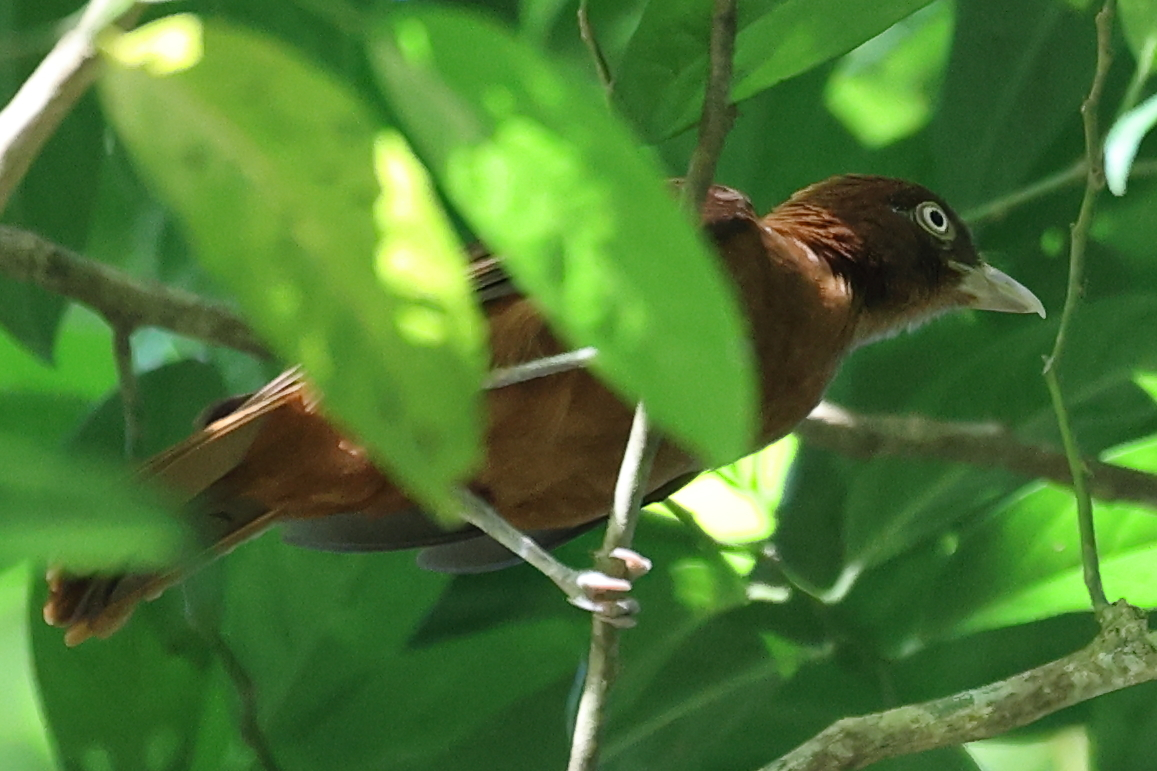
- Rusty pitohui (Pseudorectes ferrugineus)

Scientific classification
- Kingdom: Animalia
- Phylum: Chordata
- Class: Aves
- Order: Passeriformes
- Family: Pachycephalidae
- Subfamily: Pachycephalinae
- Genus: Pseudorectes; Sharpe, 1877

Type species
- Rectes ferrugineus Bonaparte, 1850

= Pseudorectes =

Genus of birds

Pseudorectes is a bird genus in the family Pachycephalidae endemic to New Guinea.

== Pseudorectes ==
=== Extant species ===
It contains the following species:

- White-bellied pitohui (Pseudorectes incertus)
- Rusty pitohui (Pseudorectes ferrugineus)

=== Former species ===
Formerly, some authorities also considered the following species (or subspecies) as species within the genus Pseudorectes:

- Oriole whistler (as Pseudorectes cinnamomeum)
