= Variable pitohui =

Variable pitohui may refer to several species of birds:

- Northern variable pitohui, found on New Guinea and neighboring islands
- Southern variable pitohui, found on New Guinea and neighboring islands
