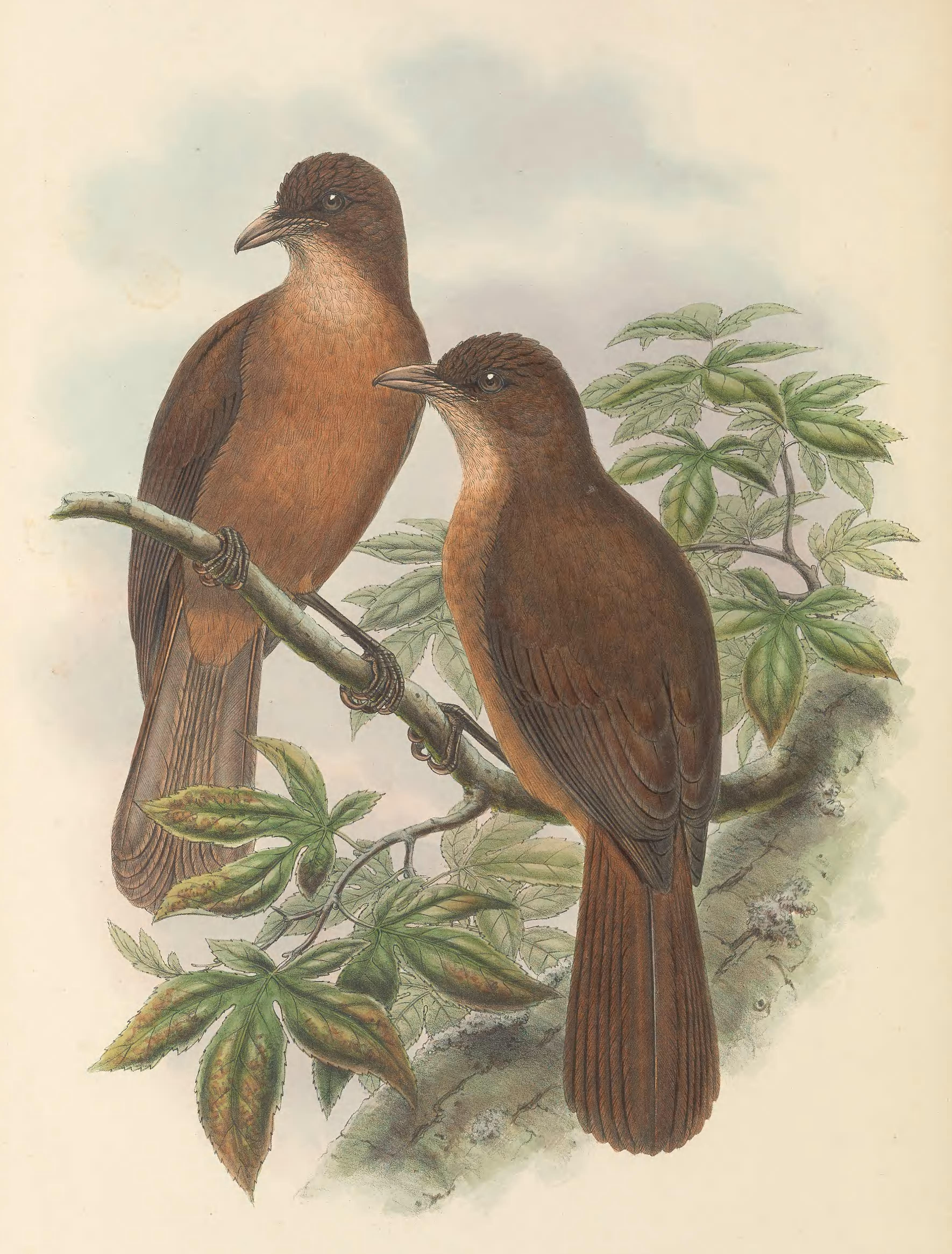
- Illustration by William Matthew Hart
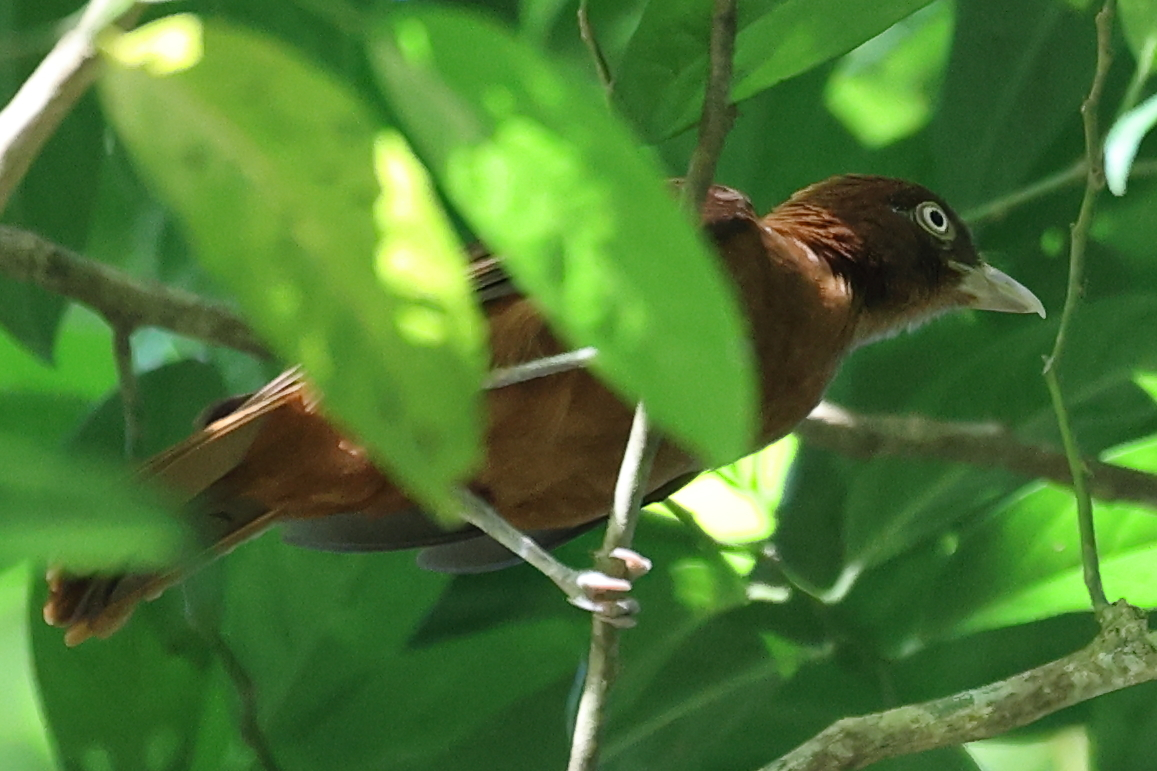

Conservation status
- Least Concern (IUCN 3.1)

Scientific classification
- Kingdom: Animalia
- Phylum: Chordata
- Class: Aves
- Order: Passeriformes
- Family: Pachycephalidae
- Genus: Pseudorectes
- Species: P. ferrugineus

Binomial name
- Pseudorectes ferrugineus (Bonaparte, 1850)

Subspecies
- See text

Synonyms
- Colluricincla ferruginea; Pitohui ferrugineus; Rectes ferrugineus

= Rusty pitohui =

Species of bird

The rusty pitohui (Pseudorectes ferrugineus) is a species of bird in the family Pachycephalidae. It is found throughout the lowlands of the Aru Islands and New Guinea.

== Taxonomy and systematics ==
The rusty pitohui was originally classified within the genus Rectes (a synonym for the genus Pitohui) until moved to Pseudorectes by the IOC in 2013. Alternatively, some other authorities classify the rusty pitohui in the genus Colluricincla. Alternate names for the rusty pitohui include the ferrugineous pitohui and rusty shrike-thrush.

=== Subspecies ===
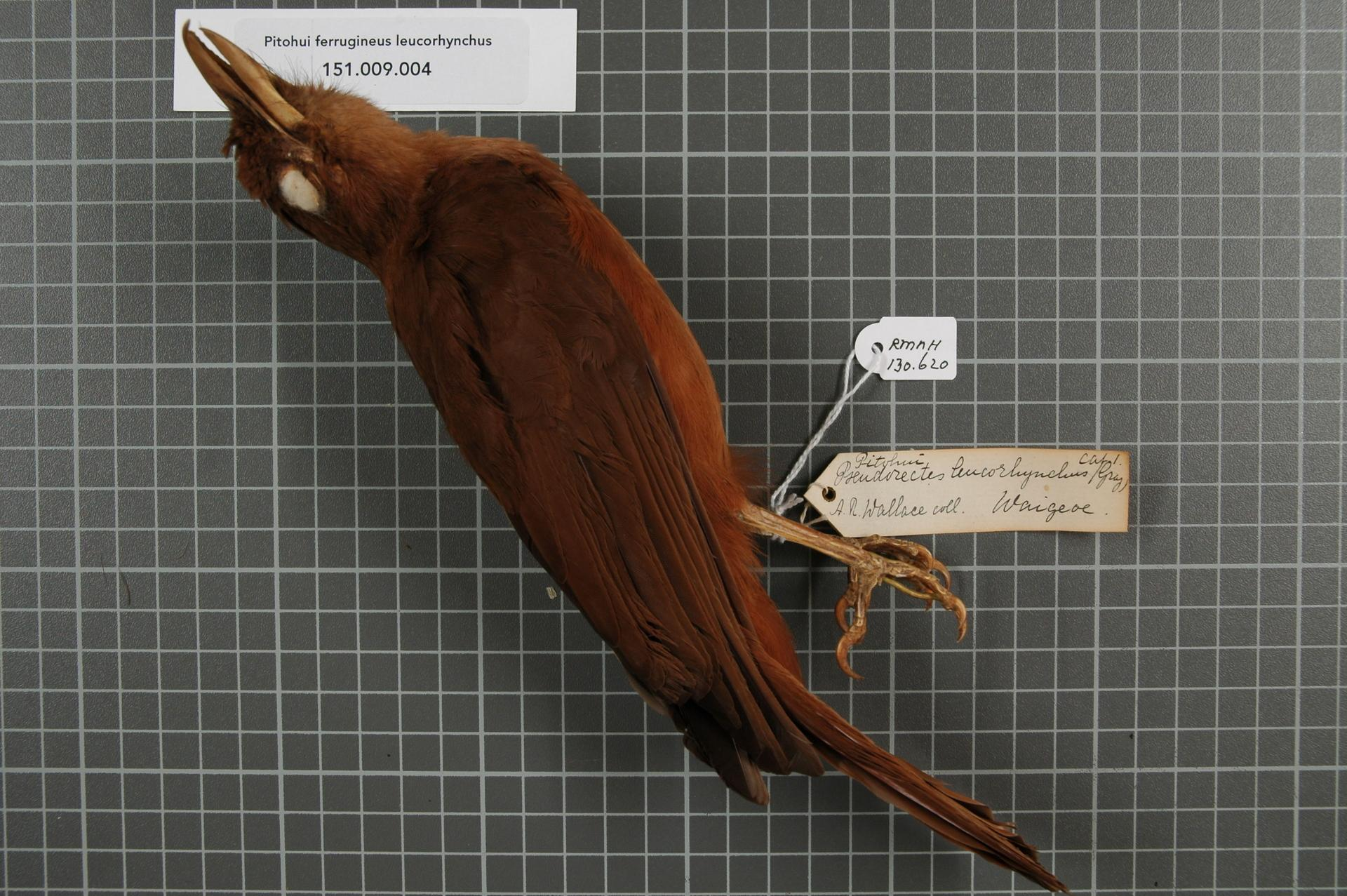
P. f. leucorhynchus in Naturalis Biodiversity Center

Six subspecies are recognized:

- P. f. leucorhynchus - (Gray, GR, 1862): Originally described as a separate species in the genus Rectes. Found on Waigeo (off western New Guinea)
- P. f. fuscus - (Greenway, 1966): Found on Batanta (off western New Guinea)
- P. f. brevipennis - (Hartert, 1896): Found on Aru Islands (off south-western New Guinea)
- P. f. ferrugineus - (Bonaparte, 1850): Found on Misool and Salawati (off south-western New Guinea) and north-western New Guinea
- P. f. holerythrus - (Salvadori, 1878): Originally described as a separate species in the genus Rectes. Found on Yapen (off north-western New Guinea) and north-central New Guinea
- P. f. clarus - (Meyer, AB, 1894): Found in eastern and southern New Guinea

== Description ==
The rusty pitohui is a medium-sized, approximately 28 cm long, rusty brown songbird with a strong black bill, pale iris and yellowish-buff below. The subspecies P. f. leucorhynchus and P. f. fuscus of Waigeo and Batanta islands off Western New Guinea have a whitish bill. It is the largest member of its family. Both sexes are similar.

== Distribution and habitat ==
The rusty pitohui is distributed and endemic to lowland and hill forests of New Guinea, Aru Island and West Papuan islands.

== Behaviour and ecology ==
The rusty pitohui is usually seen in small parties, mixed with other gregarious species. It builds a deep, cup-shaped nest of sticks, leaves and stems in a fork of a tree.

== Status ==
Widespread and common throughout its habitat range, the rusty pitohui is evaluated as least concern on the IUCN Red List of Threatened Species.
