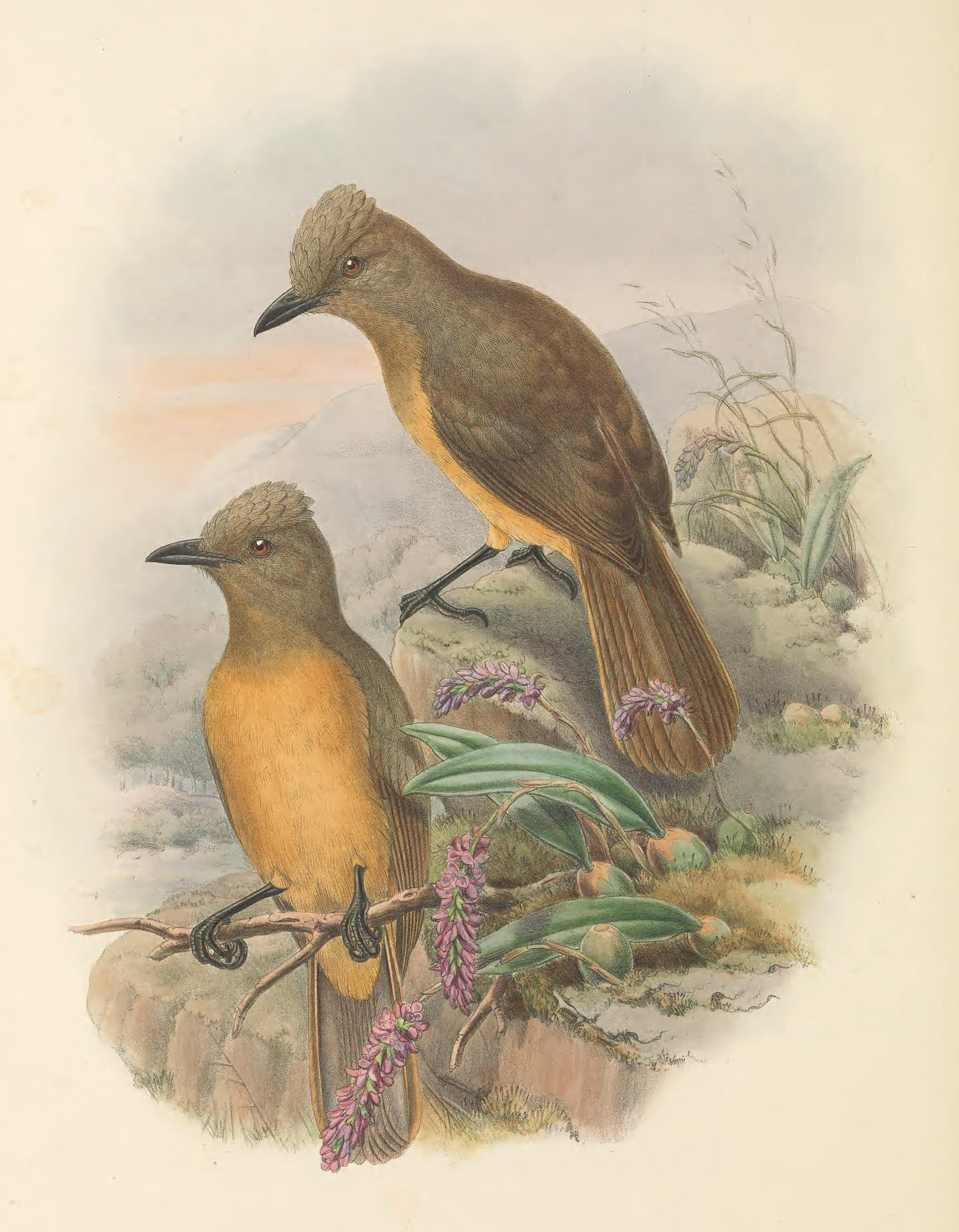

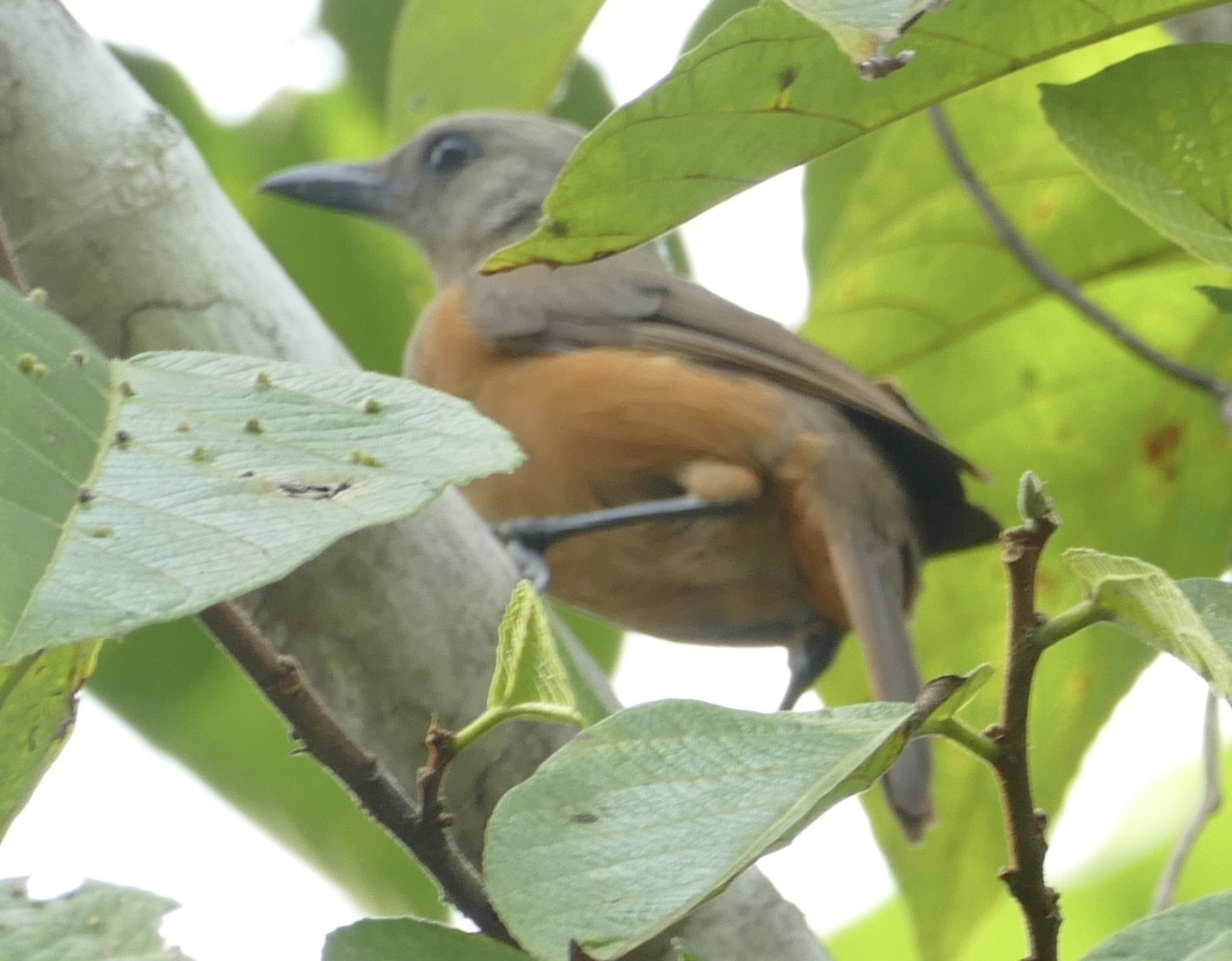

Conservation status
- Least Concern (IUCN 3.1)

Scientific classification
- Kingdom: Animalia
- Phylum: Chordata
- Class: Aves
- Order: Passeriformes
- Family: Oriolidae
- Genus: Pitohui
- Species: P. cerviniventris

Binomial name
- Pitohui cerviniventris (Gray, GR, 1862)

Subspecies
- See text

Synonyms
- Rectes cerviniventris

= Raja Ampat pitohui =

Species of bird

The Raja Ampat pitohui (Pitohui cerviniventris), or Waigeo pitohui, is a species of pitohui in the family Oriolidae found on the western Papuan Islands of New Guinea. Its natural habitat is subtropical or tropical moist lowland forests. It is also one of the few known poisonous birds.

== Taxonomy and systematics ==
This species was split from the northern variable pitohui in 2013.

=== Subspecies ===
Two subspecies are recognized:

- P. c. pallidus - van Oort, 1907: Found on Sagewin and Batanta Islands (western Papuan Islands)
- P. c. cerviniventris - (Gray, GR, 1862): Found on Waigeo and Gemien Islands (western Papuan Islands)
