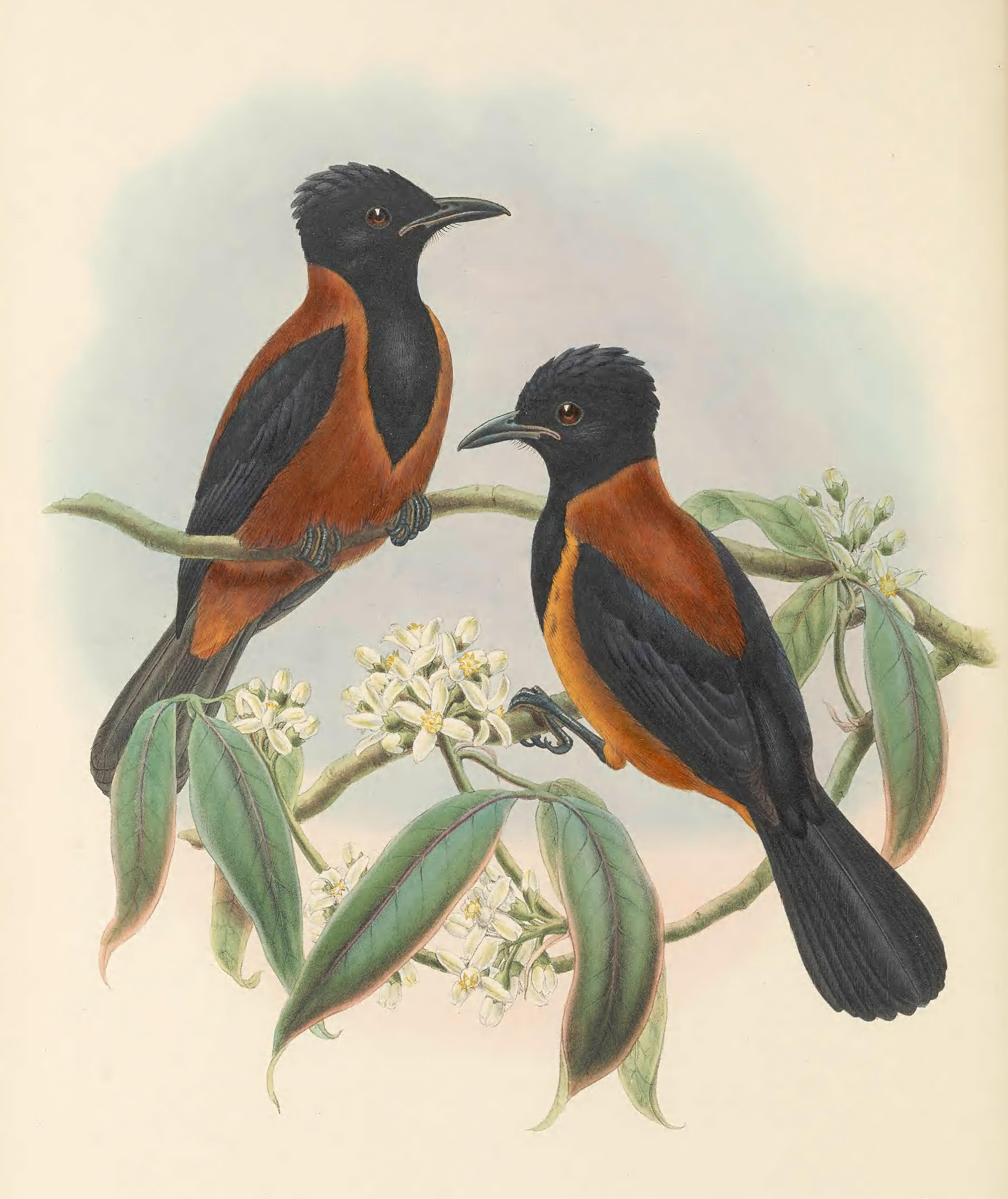

Conservation status
- Least Concern (IUCN 3.1)

Scientific classification
- Kingdom: Animalia
- Phylum: Chordata
- Class: Aves
- Order: Passeriformes
- Family: Oriolidae
- Genus: Pitohui
- Species: P. uropygialis

Binomial name
- Pitohui uropygialis (Gray, GR, 1862)

Synonyms
- Rectes uropygialis

= Southern variable pitohui =

Species of bird

The southern variable pitohui (Pitohui uropygialis) is a species of pitohui in the family Oriolidae. It is found on New Guinea and neighbouring islands. Its natural habitat is subtropical or tropical moist lowland forests. It is also one of the few known poisonous birds, it carries the toxic compound homobatrachotoxins in its feathers and skin.

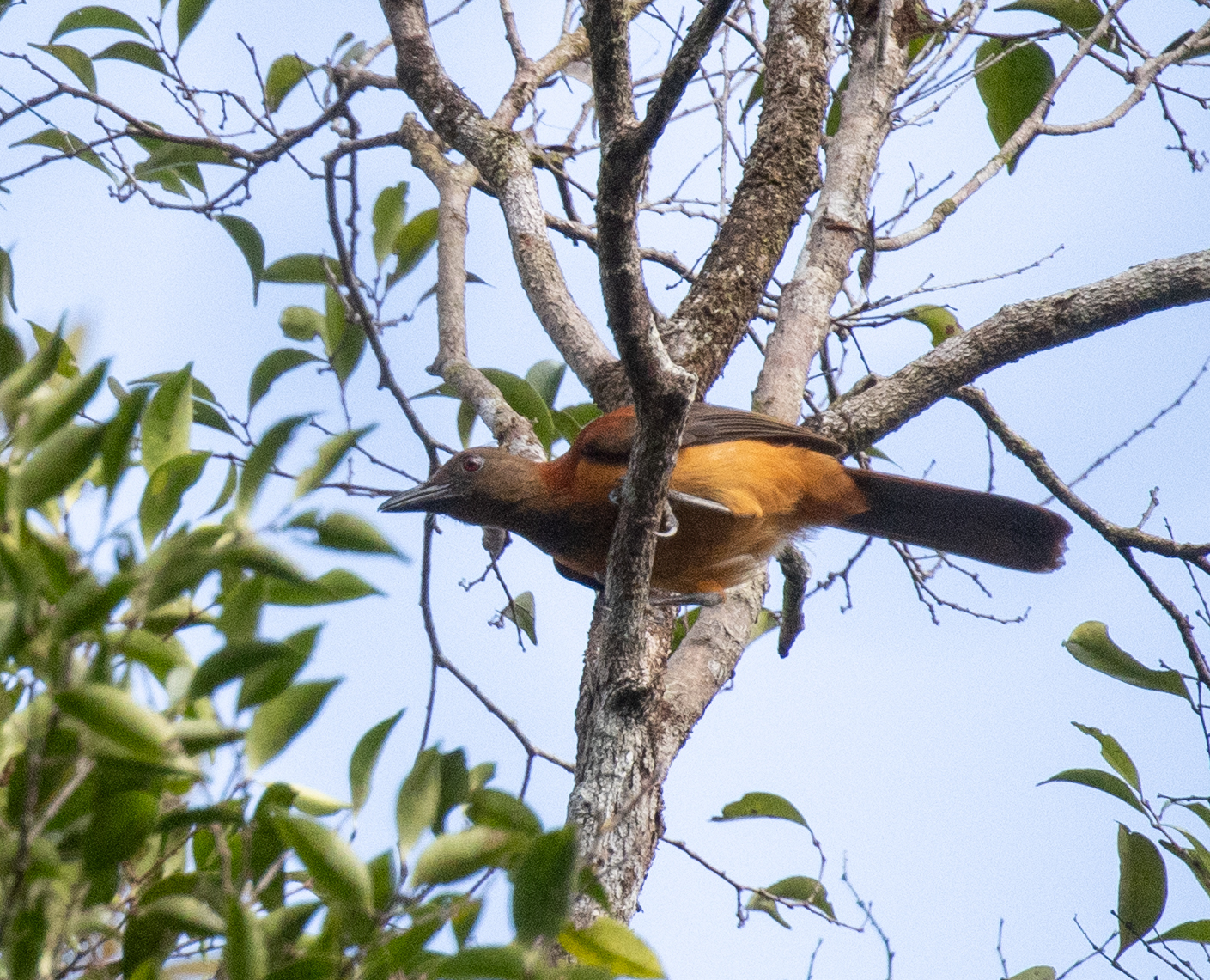
In Papua New Guinea

== Taxonomy and systematics ==
This species was split from the northern variable pitohui in 2013.

=== Subspecies ===
Five subspecies are recognized:

- P. u. uropygialis - (Gray, GR, 1862): Found on Salawati and Misool Islands (western Papuan Islands) and western Vogelkop (north-western New Guinea)
- P. u. brunneiceps - (D'Albertis & Salvadori, 1879): Originally described as a separate species. Found from Gulf of Papua to Fly River (southern New Guinea)
- P. u. nigripectus - van Oort, 1909: Found from Mimika River to Pulau River (southern New Guinea)
- P. u. aruensis - (Sharpe, 1877): Originally described as a separate species. Found on Aru Islands (off south-western New Guinea)
- P. u. meridionalis - (Sharpe, 1888): Originally described as a separate species. Found in south-eastern New Guinea
