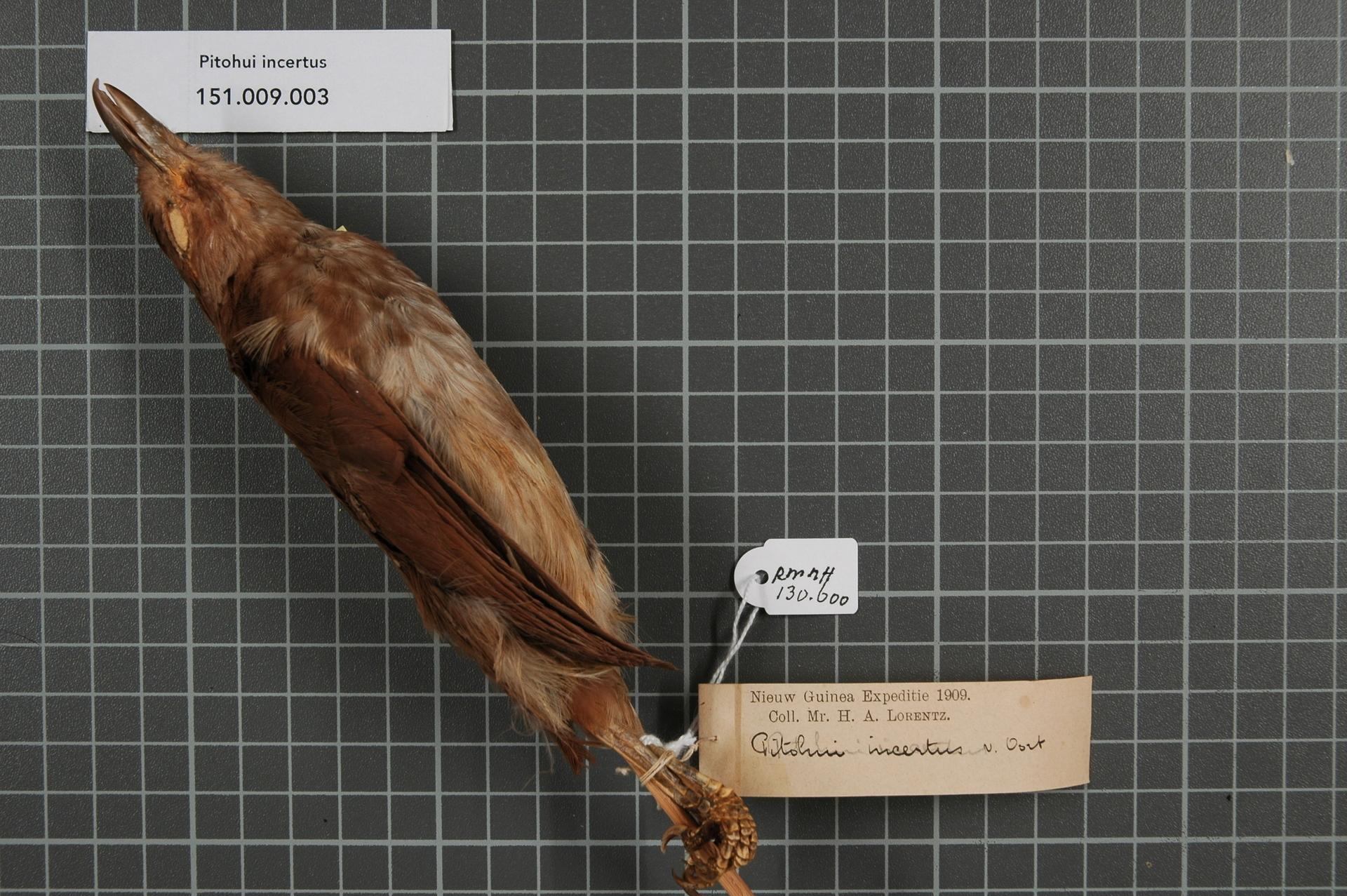

Conservation status
- Least Concern (IUCN 3.1)

Scientific classification
- Kingdom: Animalia
- Phylum: Chordata
- Class: Aves
- Order: Passeriformes
- Family: Pachycephalidae
- Genus: Pseudorectes
- Species: P. incertus

Binomial name
- Pseudorectes incertus (van Oort, 1909)

Synonyms
- Colluricincla incerta; Pitohui incertus

= White-bellied pitohui =

Species of bird

The white-bellied pitohui (Pseudorectes incertus) is a species of bird in the family Pachycephalidae. It is found throughout the lowlands of southern New Guinea (Lorentz River to upper Fly River.

== Taxonomy and systematics ==
The white-bellied pitohui was originally described in the genus Pitohui until moved to Pseudorectes by the IOC in 2013. Alternatively, some other authorities classify the white-bellied pitohui in the genus Colluricincla. Alternate names for the white-bellied pitohui include the brown pitohui, mottle-breasted pitohui, mottled pitohui and white-bellied shrike-thrush.

== Distribution and habitat ==
Its natural habitats are subtropical or tropical moist lowland forests and subtropical or tropical swamps. It is threatened by habitat loss.
