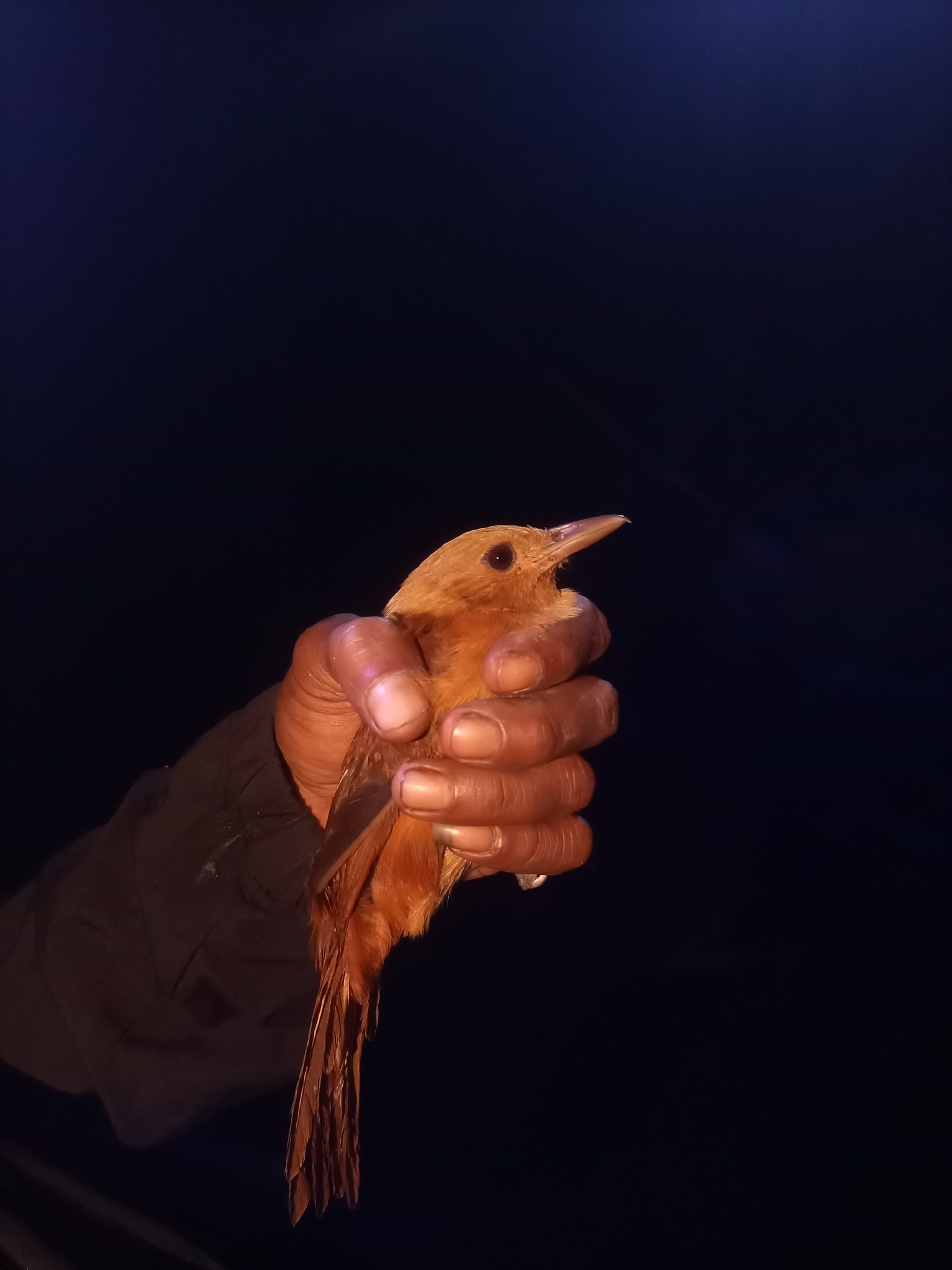

Conservation status
- Least Concern (IUCN 3.1)

Scientific classification
- Kingdom: Animalia
- Phylum: Chordata
- Class: Aves
- Order: Passeriformes
- Family: Oriolidae
- Genus: Pitohui
- Species: P. kirhocephalus

Binomial name
- Pitohui kirhocephalus (Lesson & Garnot, 1827)

Synonyms
- Lanius kirhocephalus

= Northern variable pitohui =

Species of bird

The northern variable pitohui (Pitohui kirhocephalus) is a species of pitohui in the family Oriolidae. It is found on New Guinea and a number of neighbouring islands. Its natural habitat is subtropical or tropical moist lowland forests. It is also one of the few known poisonous birds.

== Taxonomy and systematics ==
The northern variable pitohui was renamed from the variable pitohui in 2013 following the split of the Raja Ampat pitohui and the southern variable pitohui.

=== Subspecies ===
Eleven subspecies are recognized:

- Pitohui kirhocephalus kirhocephalus - (Lesson & Garnot, 1827): Found on eastern Vogelkop (north-western New Guinea)
- Pitohui kirhocephalus dohertyi - Rothschild & Hartert, 1903: Originally described as a separate species. Found in Wandammen area (north-western New Guinea)
- Pitohui kirhocephalus rubiensis - (Meyer, AB, 1884): Originally described as a separate species. Found from head of Cenderawasih Bay to Triton Bay (western New Guinea)
- Pitohui kirhocephalus brunneivertex - Rothschild, 1931: Found on eastern coast of Cenderawasih Bay (north-western New Guinea)
- Pitohui kirhocephalus decipiens - (Salvadori, 1878): Originally described as a separate species. Found on the Onin Peninsula (south-western New Guinea)
- Pitohui kirhocephalus adiensis - Mees, 1964: Found on Adi Island (off south-western New Guinea)
- Pitohui kirhocephalus carolinae - Junge, 1952: Found in the Etna Bay region of south-western New Guinea
- Pitohui kirhocephalus jobiensis - (Meyer, AB, 1874): Originally described as a separate species. Found on Kurudu Island and Yapen (off north-western New Guinea)
- Pitohui kirhocephalus meyeri - Rothschild & Hartert, 1903: Originally described as a separate species. Found on the Mamberamo coast (northern New Guinea)
- Pitohui kirhocephalus senex - Stresemann, 1922: Found in the upper Sepik region (northern New Guinea)
- Pitohui kirhocephalus brunneicaudus - (Meyer, AB, 1891): Originally described as a separate species. Found in the lower Sepik region to Astrolabe Bay (northern New Guinea)
