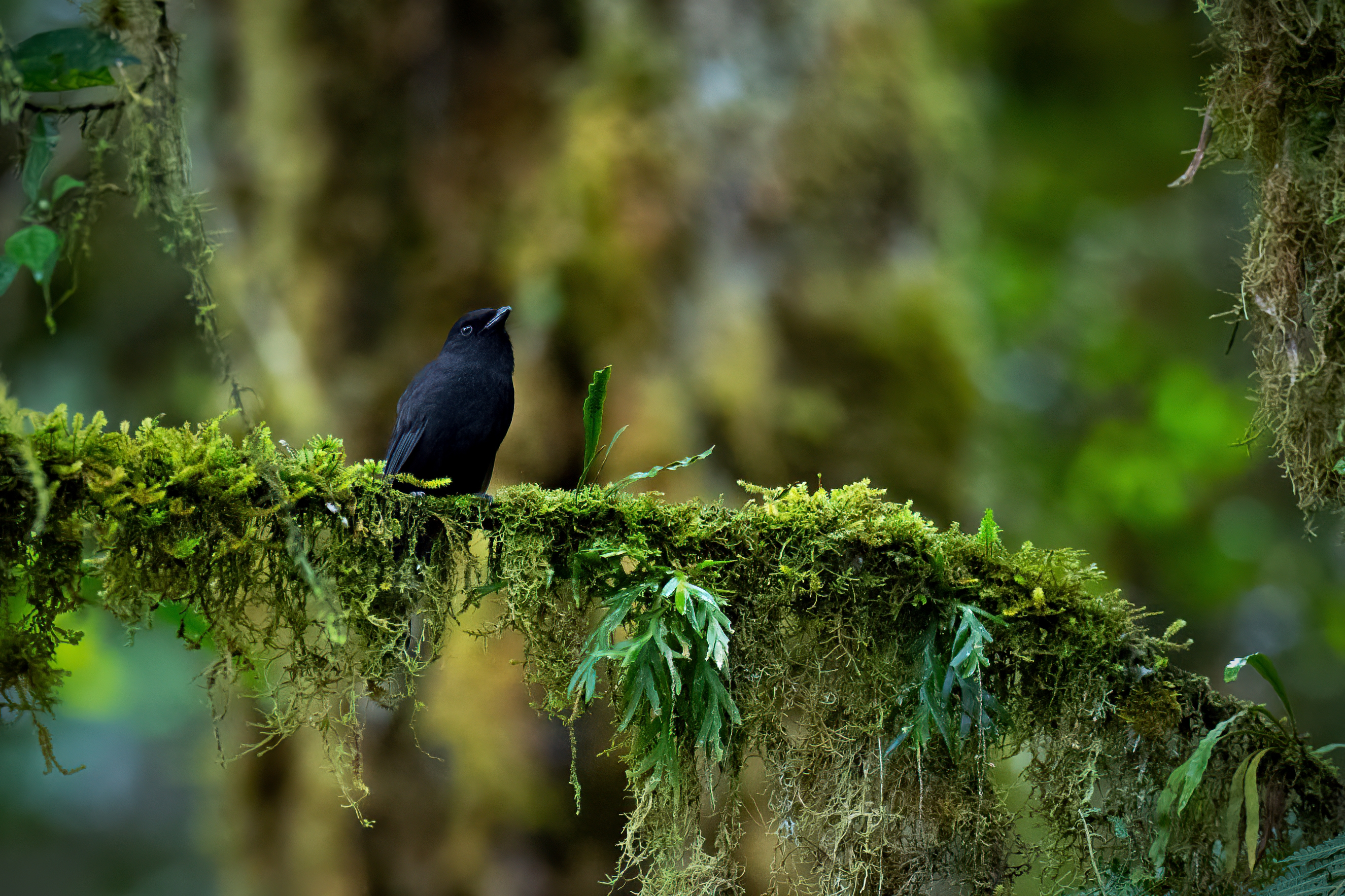

Conservation status
- Least Concern (IUCN 3.1)

Scientific classification
- Kingdom: Animalia
- Phylum: Chordata
- Class: Aves
- Order: Passeriformes
- Family: Pachycephalidae
- Genus: Melanorectes; Sharpe, 1877
- Species: M. nigrescens

Binomial name
- Melanorectes nigrescens (Schlegel, 1871)

Subspecies
- See text

Synonyms
- Pitohui nigrescens; Rectes nigrescens

= Black pitohui =

Species of bird

The black pitohui (Melanorectes nigrescens) is a species of bird in the monotypic genus of Melanorectes in the family Pachycephalidae. It is found throughout the highlands of New Guinea. Its natural habitat is subtropical or tropical moist lowland forests.

== Taxonomy and systematics ==
The black pitohui was originally described in the genus Rectes (a synonym for the genus Pitohui) and re-classified to Melanorectes in 2013. Alternate names include black whistler and dusky pitohui.

=== Subspecies ===
The following six subspecies are recognized:

- M. n. nigrescens – (Schlegel, 1871): Found in northwestern New Guinea
- M. n. wandamensis – (Hartert, 1930): Found in the Wandammen Peninsula (western New Guinea)
- M. n. meeki – (Rothschild & Hartert, 1913): Originally described as a separate species in the genus Pitohui. Found in west-central New Guinea
- M. n. buergersi – (Stresemann, 1922): Found in northern and east-central New Guinea
- M. n. harterti – Reichenow, 1911: Originally described as a separate species. Found in northeastern New Guinea
- M. n. schistaceus – (Reichenow, 1900): Found in southeastern New Guinea
