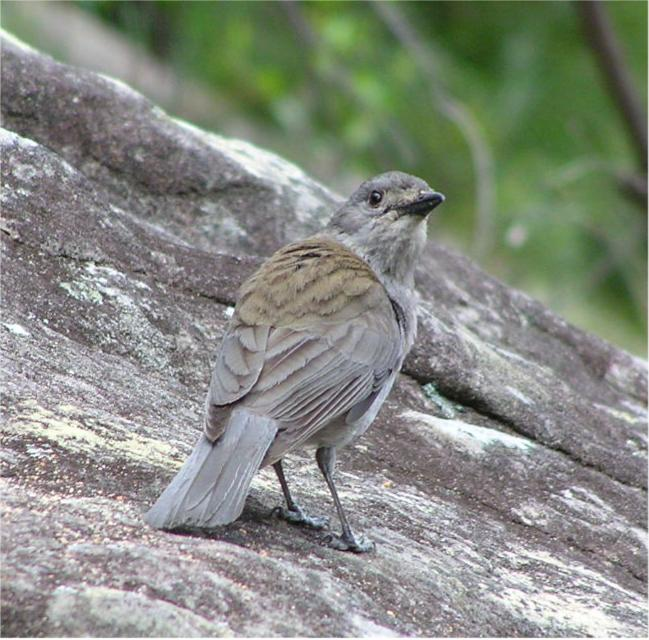
- Grey shrikethrush (C. harmonica)

Scientific classification
- Kingdom: Animalia
- Phylum: Chordata
- Class: Aves
- Order: Passeriformes
- Family: Pachycephalidae
- Subfamily: Pachycephalinae
- Genus: Colluricincla; Vigors & Horsfield, 1827

Type species
- Colluricincla cinerea Vigors & Horsfield, 1827

Synonyms
- Alphacincla Mathews, 1914; Bowyeria Mathews, 1912; Caleya Mathews, 1913; Collurisoma Rafinesque, 1815; Collyriocichla; Collyriocincla; Conigravea Mathews, 1913; Malacolestes Mayr, 1933; Myialestes; Myiolestes Bonaparte, 1850

= Shrikethrush =

Shrikethrushes

Genus of birds

A shrikethrush, also spelled shrike-thrush, is any one of five species of songbird that is a member of the genus Colluricincla. They have nondescript, predominantly brown or grey, plumage, but are accomplished singers, their calls described as "strong, mellow and beautiful". Shrikethrushes are generally insectivorous, though have been recorded eating molluscs and berries. They build cup-shaped nests in the forks of trees.

== Taxonomy and systematics ==
Nicholas Aylward Vigors and Thomas Horsfield described the genus in 1827, coining the genus name from the Ancient Greek words collurio "shrike" and cinclos "thrush". Noting the beak, they thought it related to shrikes or vangas, though its form was reminiscent of thrushes. Shrikethrushes were commonly known as colluricinclas in the 19th century, but their current name was in use by the late 19th century.

Molecular studies by Norman and colleagues in 2009 and Jønsson and colleagues in 2010 show the shrikethrushes to lie within the whistler family Pachycephalidae. Formerly, some authorities classified the shrikethrushes in their own family Colluricinclidae.

Molecular dating suggests the shrikethrushes diverged from the common ancestor of the genus Pseudorectes (their closest relatives) in the mid-Pliocene around 3 million years ago, and that this combined lineage had diverged from the ancestor of the other members of the Pachycephalidae around 5 million years ago in the early Pliocene. The Sangihe whistler was found to be more closely related to the maroon-backed whistler and hence shifted to the genus Coracornis. Genetic investigations of New Guinea populations of the little shrikethrush indicate high levels of genetic divergence, suggesting it may comprise more than one species.

=== Extant species ===
The genus contains the following five species:

Image	Common name	Scientific name	Distribution
	Sandstone shrikethrush	Colluricincla woodwardi	northwestern Australia (Kimberley region, northern Western Australia, Arnhem Land sandstone, northern Northern Territory, and northwestern Queensland)
	Bower's shrikethrush	Colluricincla boweri	northeastern Australia (Wet Tropics region uplands)
	Grey shrikethrush	Colluricincla harmonica	Throughout mainland Australia and Tasmania
-	Sooty shrikethrush	Colluricincla tenebrosa	patchily in montane west-central to east-central New Guinea
	Little shrikethrush	Colluricincla megarhyncha	New Guinea, north and east Australia

=== Former species ===
Formerly, some authorities also considered the following species (or subspecies) as species within the genus Colluricincla:

- Sangihe whistler (as Colluricincla sanghirensis)
- Island whistler (as Myiolestes phaionotus)
- Yellow-throated whistler (as Myiolestes macrorhynchus)
- Biak whistler (as Colluricincla melanorhyncha)
- Morningbird (as Colluricincla tenebrosa)
- White-bellied pitohui (as Colluricincla incerta)
- Rusty pitohui (as Colluricincla ferruginea)
- Fiji shrikebill (as Myiolestes vitiensis)
- Fiji shrikebill (buensis) (as Myiolestes buensis)
- Futuna lesser shrikebill (as Myiolestes fortunae)
- Fiji shrikebill (heinei) (as Myiolestes heinei)
