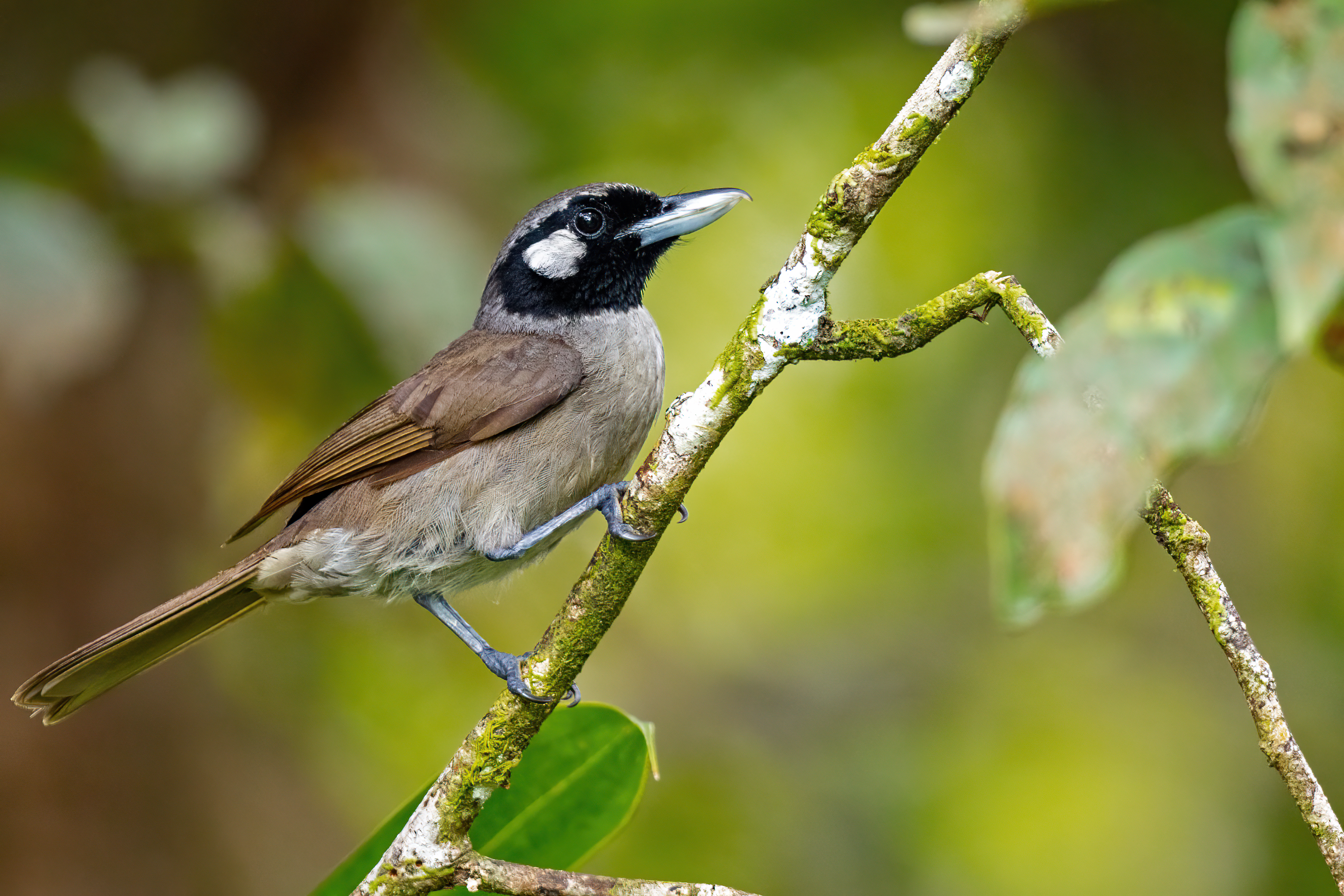
- Black-throated shrikebill

Scientific classification
- Kingdom: Animalia
- Phylum: Chordata
- Class: Aves
- Order: Passeriformes
- Family: Monarchidae
- Genus: Clytorhynchus; Elliot, 1870

Type species
- Clytorhynchus pachycephaloides Elliot, 1870

Diversity
- 5 species

Synonyms
- Pinarolestes Sharpe, 1877

= Shrikebill =

Shrikebills

Genus of birds

The shrikebills are the monarch flycatcher genus Clytorhynchus. The five species have long laterally compressed bills similar to true shrikes that give them their names. The genus is endemic to the islands of Melanesia and western Polynesia.

The shrikebills are insectivorous, and use their large heavy bills to explore tangles of dead leaves and dead wood; an unusual foraging strategy for their family. Their diet may also include small fruits and lizards.

== Taxonomy and systematics ==
=== Extant species ===
The genus Clytorhynchus contains the following species:

Image	Common name	Scientific name	Distribution
	Southern shrikebill	Clytorhynchus pachycephaloides	New Caledonia and Vanuatu.
	Fiji shrikebill	Clytorhynchus vitiensis	American Samoa, Fiji, and Tonga.
	Black-throated shrikebill	Clytorhynchus nigrogularis	Fiji and Solomon Islands.
	Santa Cruz shrikebill	Clytorhynchus sanctaecrucis	Solomon Islands.
	Rennell shrikebill	Clytorhynchus hamlini	Rennell Island in the Solomon Islands. I

=== Former species ===
Formerly, some authorities also considered the following species (or subspecies) as species within the genus Clytorhynchus:

- Sangihe whistler (as Pinarolestes sanghirensis)
- Little shrikethrush (as Pinarolestes megarhynchos or Pinarolestes megarhynchus)
