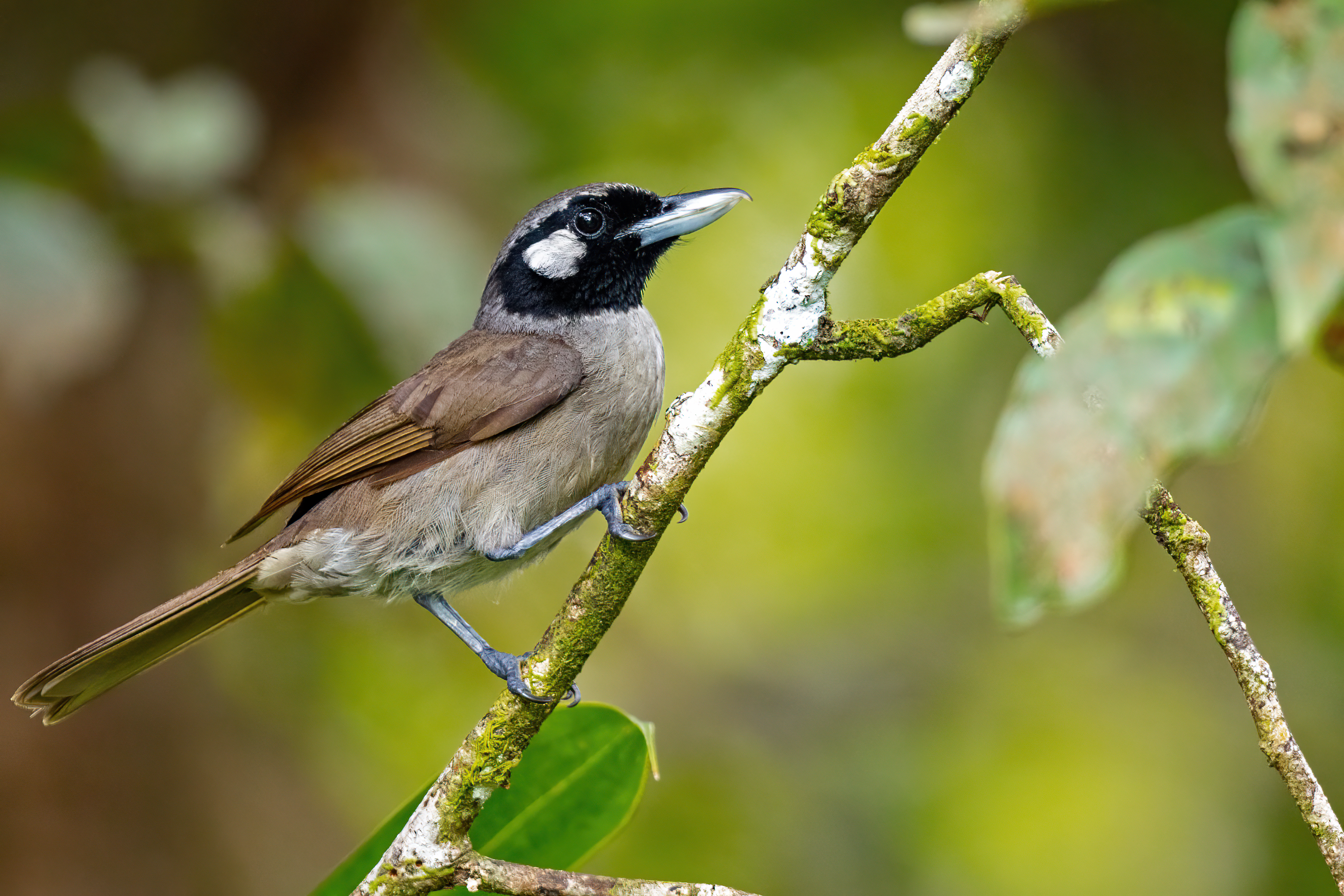

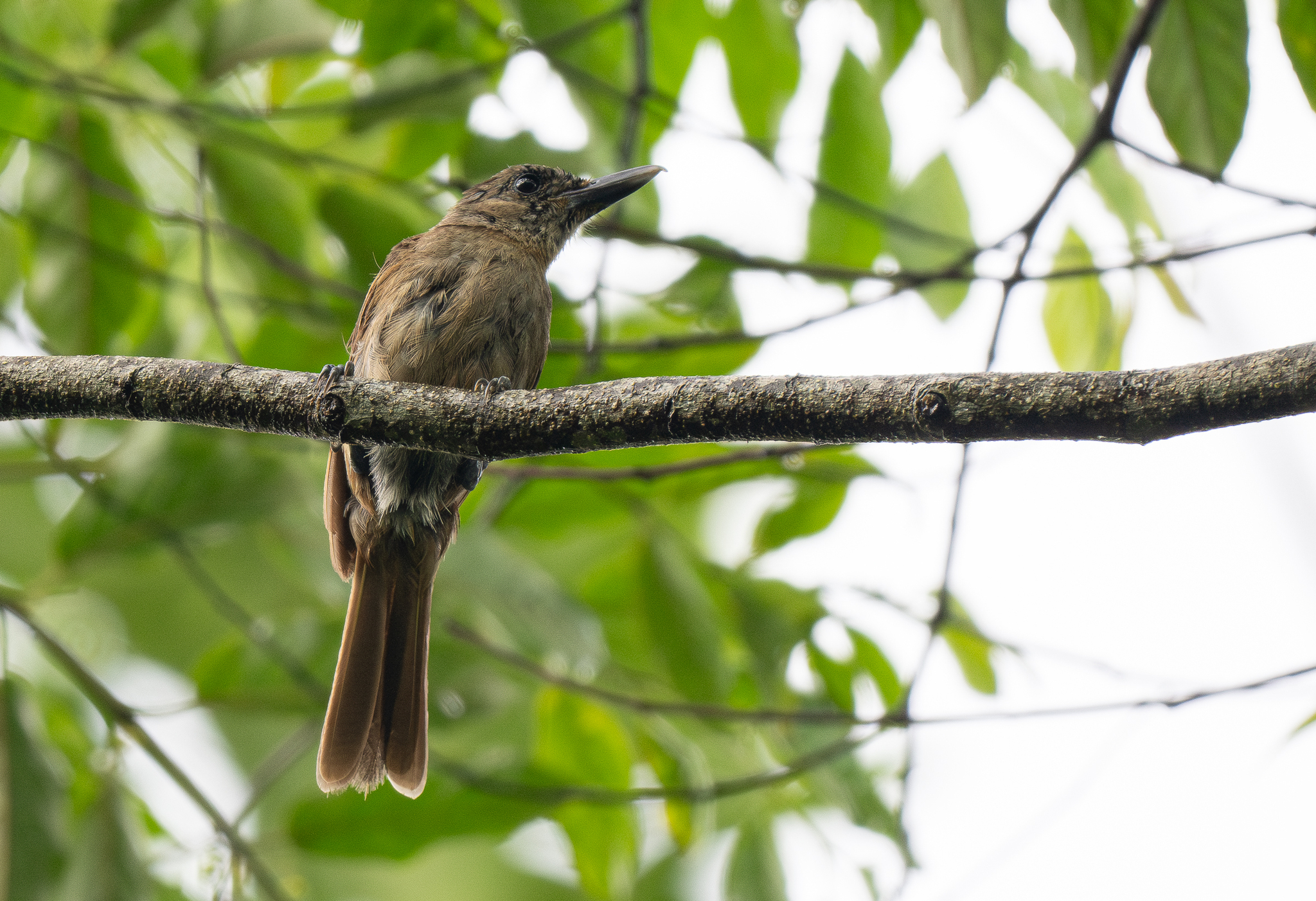

Conservation status
- Near Threatened (IUCN 3.1)

Scientific classification
- Kingdom: Animalia
- Phylum: Chordata
- Class: Aves
- Order: Passeriformes
- Family: Monarchidae
- Genus: Clytorhynchus
- Species: C. nigrogularis

Binomial name
- Clytorhynchus nigrogularis (Layard, 1875)

= Black-throated shrikebill =

Species of bird

The black-throated shrikebill or black-faced shrikebill (Clytorhynchus nigrogularis) is a songbird species in the family Monarchidae.

It is found in Fiji and Solomon Islands. Its natural habitats are subtropical or tropical moist lowland forests and subtropical or tropical moist montane forests. It is threatened by habitat loss.

The black-throated shrikebill was originally described in the genus Lalage. The Santa Cruz shrikebill was split from the black-throated shrikebill in 2008 but some authorities still consider it to be its subspecies, C. n. sanctaecrucis.
