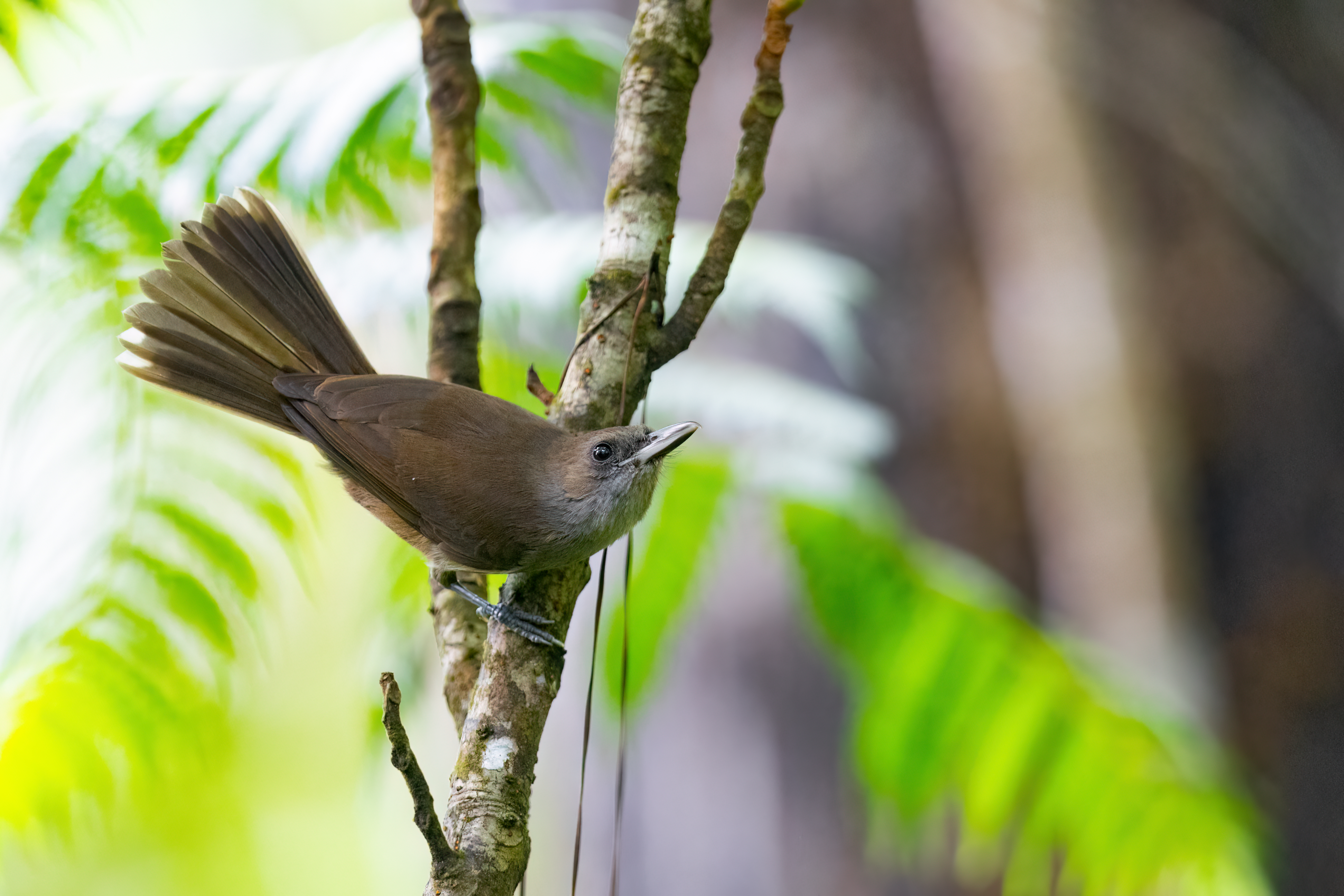

Conservation status
- Least Concern (IUCN 3.1)

Scientific classification
- Kingdom: Animalia
- Phylum: Chordata
- Class: Aves
- Order: Passeriformes
- Family: Monarchidae
- Genus: Clytorhynchus
- Species: C. vitiensis

Binomial name
- Clytorhynchus vitiensis (Hartlaub, 1866)

Subspecies
- See text

Synonyms
- Myiolestes vitiensis; Pinarolestes vitiensis

= Fiji shrikebill =

Species of bird

The Fiji shrikebill (Clytorhynchus vitiensis) is a songbird species in the family Monarchidae. It is found in American Samoa, Fiji, and Tonga. Its natural habitat is subtropical or tropical moist lowland forests.

== Taxonomy and systematics ==
The Fiji shrikebill was originally described as belonging to the genus Myiolestes. Alternate names include the lesser shrikebill and uniform shrikebill.

=== Subspecies ===
Twelve subspecies are recognized:

- Rotuman lesser shrikebill (C. v. wiglesworthi) - Mayr, 1933: Found on Rotuma Island (northern Fiji)
- C. v. brunneus - (Ramsay, EP, 1875): Found on Kadavu, Ono and Vanua Kula (south-western Fiji)
- C. v. buensis – (Layard, EL, 1876): Originally described as a separate species in the genus Myiolestes. Found on Vanua Levu and Kioa (northern Fiji)
- C. v. vitiensis – (Hartlaub, 1866): Found in western Fiji
- C. v. layardi – Mayr, 1933: Found on Taveuni (central Fiji)
- C. v. pontifex – Mayr, 1933: Found on Qamea and Rabi (northern Fiji)
- Vanuatu lesser shrikebill (C. v. vatuanus) – Mayr, 1933: Found on northern Lau Islands (eastern Fiji)
- C. v. nesiotes – (Wetmore, 1919): Originally described as a separate species. Found on southern Lau Islands (eastern Fiji)
- Futuna lesser shrikebill (C. v. fortunae) – (Layard, EL, 1876): Originally described as a separate species in the genus Myiolestes. Found on Futuna and Alofi (north-east of Fiji)
- C. v. heinei – (Finsch & Hartlaub, 1870): Originally described as a separate species in the genus Myiolestes. Found on central Tonga Islands
- C. v. keppeli – Mayr, 1933: Found on Niuatoputapu and Tafahi (northern Tonga)
- Manu'a shrikebill (C. v. powelli) – (Salvin, 1879): Originally described as a separate species. Found on Samoa but may have gone extinct in the 1990s due to habitat destruction
