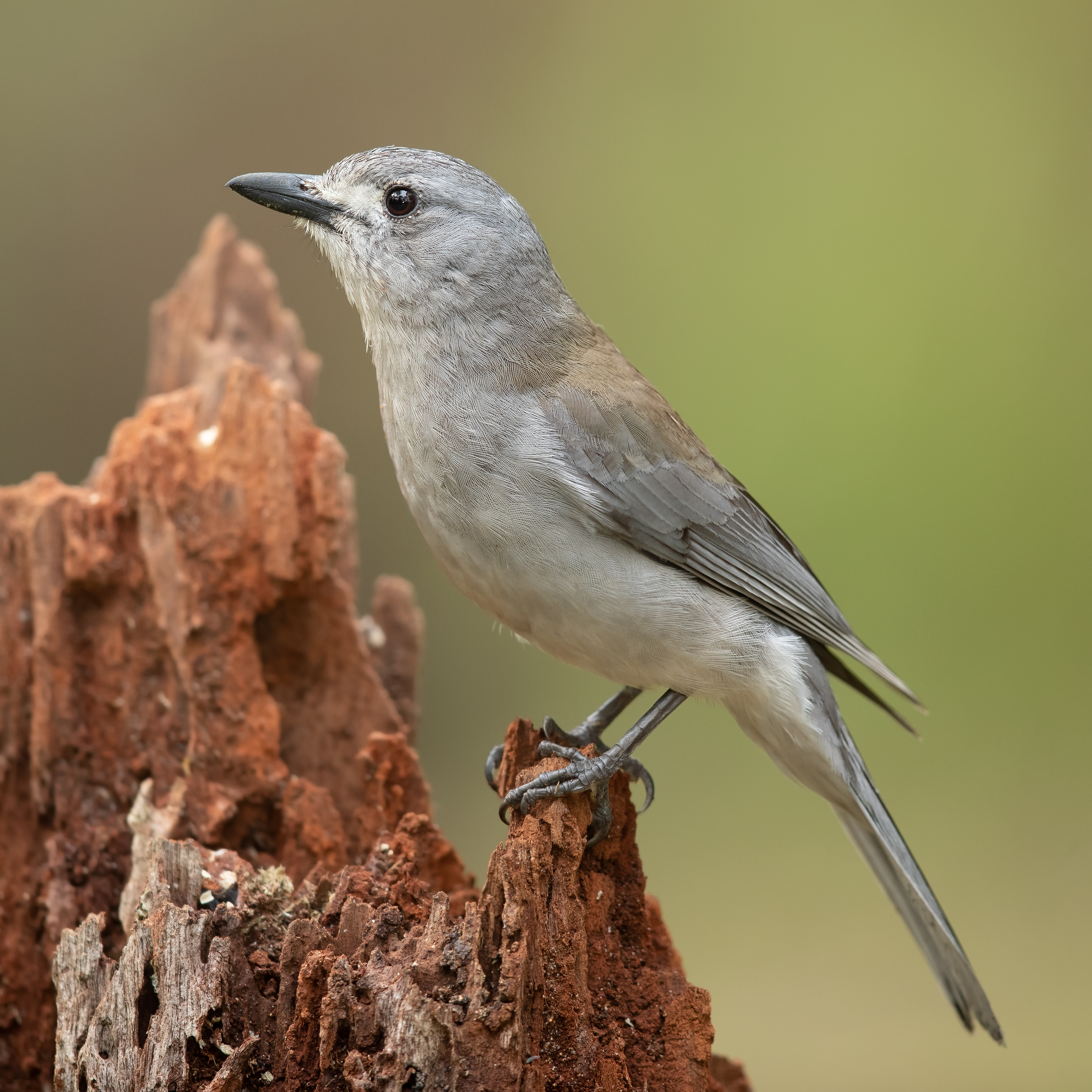
- Colluricincla harmonica harmonica

Conservation status
- Least Concern (IUCN 3.1)

Scientific classification
- Kingdom: Animalia
- Phylum: Chordata
- Class: Aves
- Order: Passeriformes
- Family: Pachycephalidae
- Genus: Colluricincla
- Species: C. harmonica

Binomial name
- Colluricincla harmonica (Latham, 1801)

Subspecies
- See text

Synonyms
- Turdus harmonicus

= Grey shrikethrush =

Grey shrike-thrush

Species of bird

The grey shrikethrush or grey shrike-thrush (Colluricincla harmonica), formerly commonly known as grey thrush, is a songbird of Australasia. It is moderately common to common in most parts of Australia, but absent from the driest of the inland deserts. It is also found in New Guinea.

== Taxonomy and systematics ==
The grey shrikethrush was originally described in the genus Turdus. Alternate names include the brown shrike-thrush, buff-bellied shrike-thrush, grey shrike-flycatcher, northern shrike-thrush and south-western shrike-thrush.

=== Subspecies ===
Five subspecies are recognized:

- C. h. brunnea – Gould, 1841: Originally described as a separate species. Found in northern Australia and Melville Island
- C. h. superciliosa – Masters, 1876: Originally described as a separate species. Found in eastern New Guinea, islands in the Torres Strait and north-eastern Australia
- C. h. harmonica – (Latham, 1801): Found in eastern Australia
- C. h. strigata – Swainson, 1838: Originally described as a separate species. Found in Tasmania and the islands in the Bass Strait (Australia)
- Western shrikethrush (C. h. rufiventris) – Gould, 1841: Originally described as a separate species. Found in western, southern and central Australia

== Description ==
The grey shrikethrush — usually just thrush in casual conversation — is of medium size (about 24 cm or 9.4 in long) and lacks bright colours. It has a recognizable ringing melody.

== Status ==
The grey shrikethrush is evaluated as least concern on the IUCN Red List of Threatened Species.

== Gallery ==
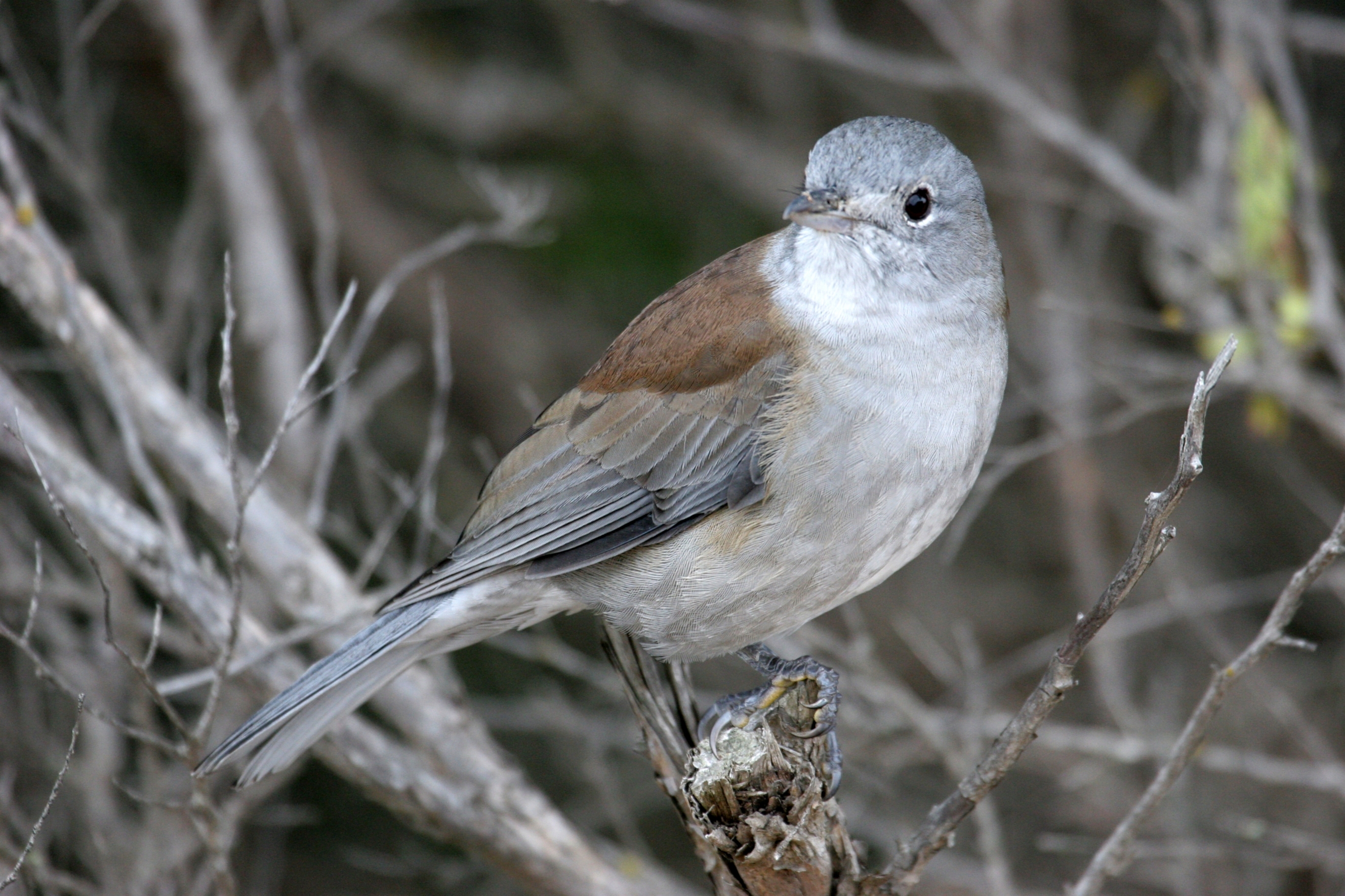
In Victoria

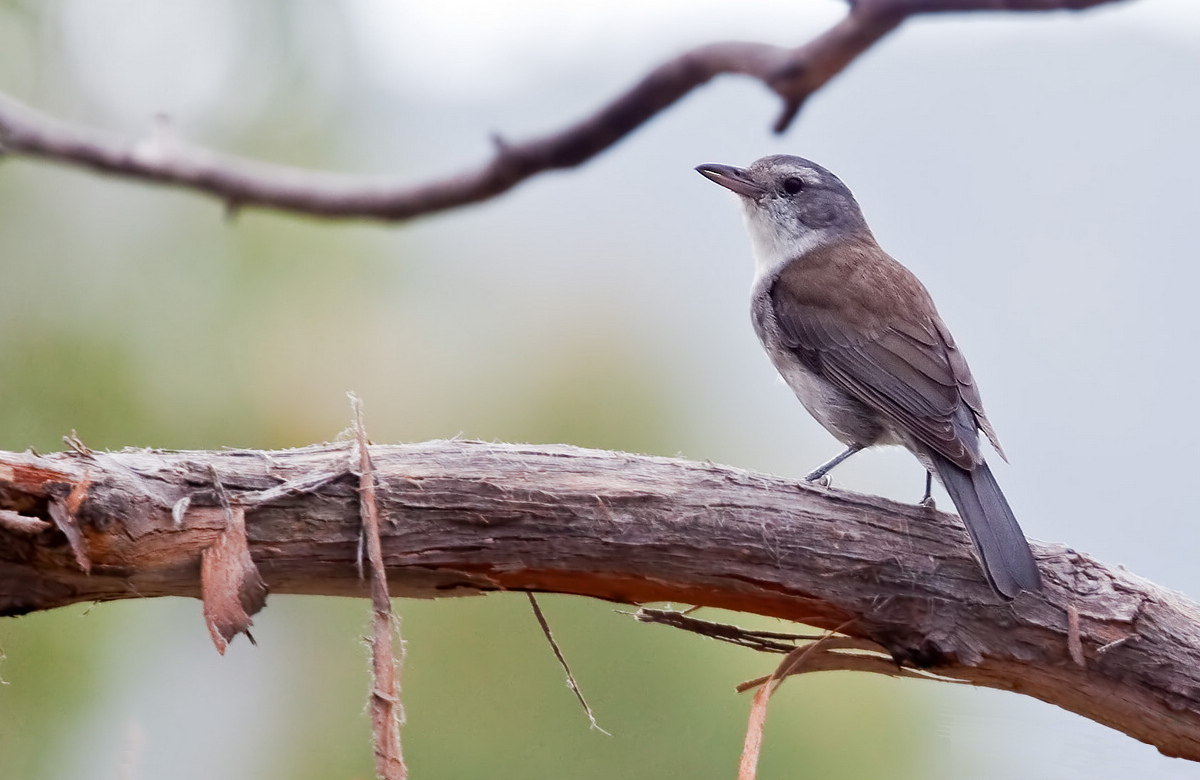
In Tasmania

In Queensland

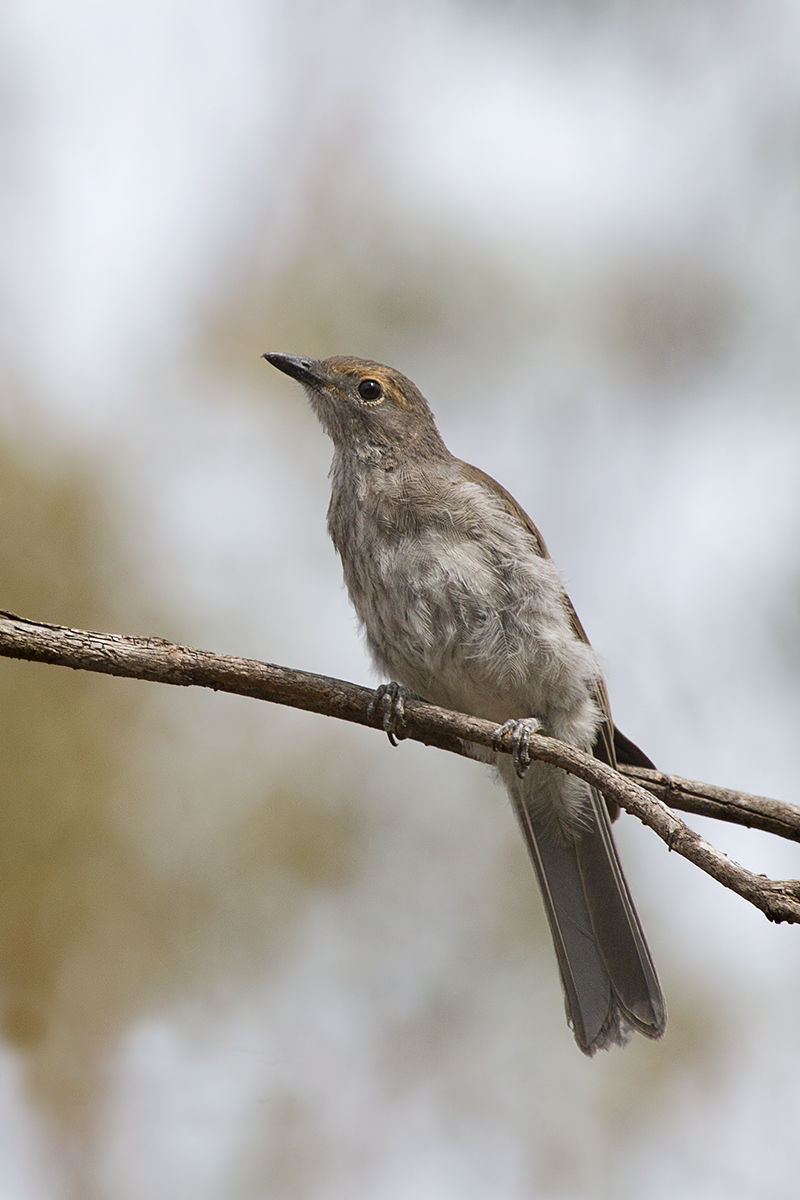
Juvenile

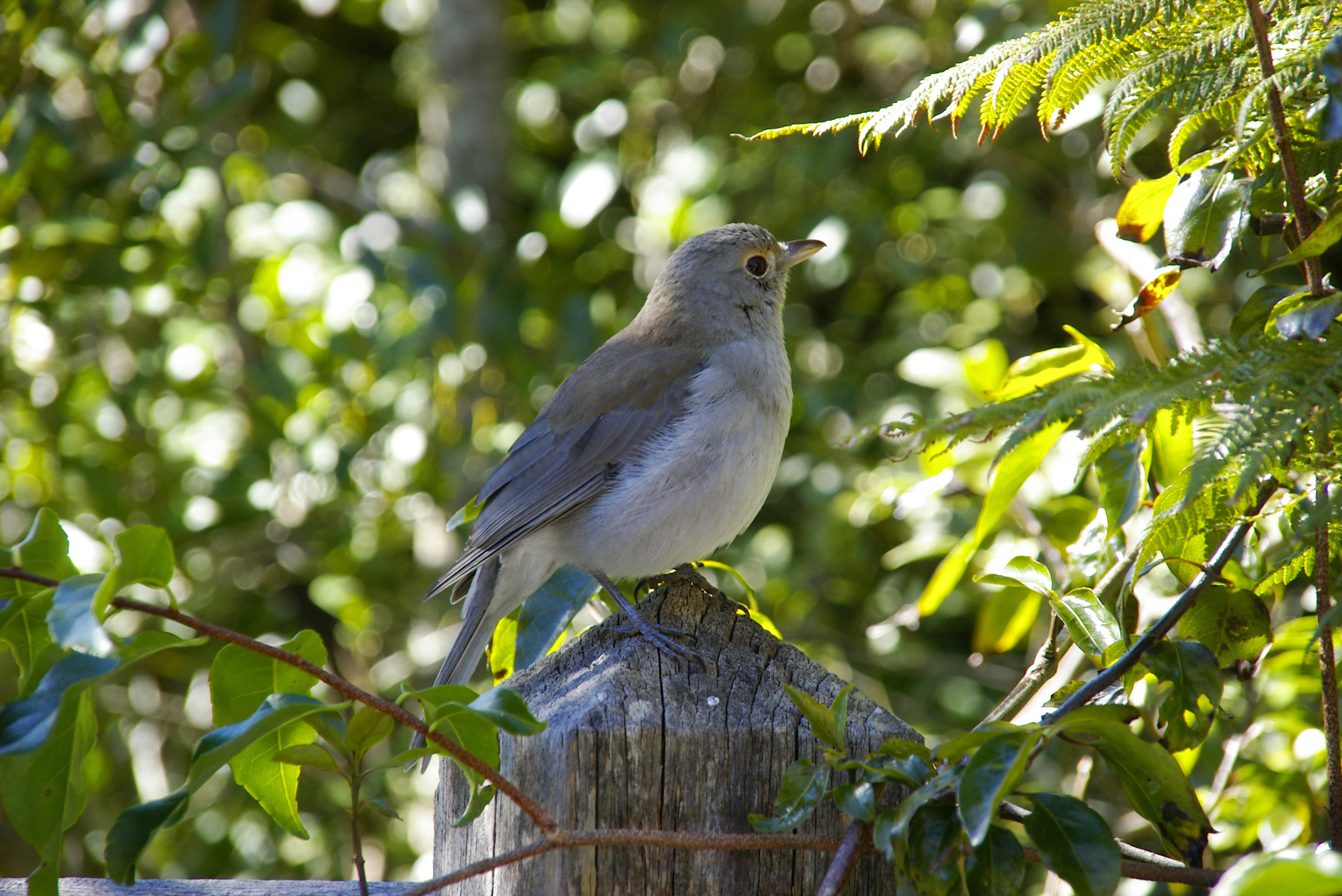
Dorrigo, New South Wales, Australia
