= Sooty shrikethrush =

Conservation status
- Least Concern (IUCN 3.1)

Scientific classification
- Kingdom: Animalia
- Phylum: Chordata
- Class: Aves
- Order: Passeriformes
- Family: Pachycephalidae
- Genus: Colluricincla
- Species: C. tenebrosa

Binomial name
- Colluricincla tenebrosa (Rothschild, 1911)

Subspecies
- See text

Synonyms
- Colluricincla umbrina; Pachycephala tenebrosa

Species of bird

The sooty shrikethrush (Colluricincla tenebrosa) is a species of bird in the family Pachycephalidae. It is found in the New Guinea Highlands. Its natural habitat is subtropical or tropical moist montane forests.

== Taxonomy and systematics ==
The sooty shrikethrush was formerly known as Colluricincla umbrina (Reichenow, 1915), as the name Rectes tenebrosus Hartlaub & Finsch, 1868 (the morningbird) has priority over Pachycephala tenebrosa Rothschild, 1911 (the sooty shrikethrush) when the two species are placed in the same genus; with the transfer of the morningbird from the genus Colluricincla to Pachycephala in 2013, the sooty shrikethrush reverted from umbrina to the older name tenebrosa. Alternate names for the sooty shrikethrush include the obscure shrike-thrush, sooty robin-whistler and sooty whistler.

=== Subspecies ===
Two subspecies are recognized:

- C. t. atra – (Rothschild, 1931): Found on northern slopes of central New Guinea mountains
- C. t. tenebrosa – (Rothschild, 1911): Found on southern slopes of central New Guinea mountains
