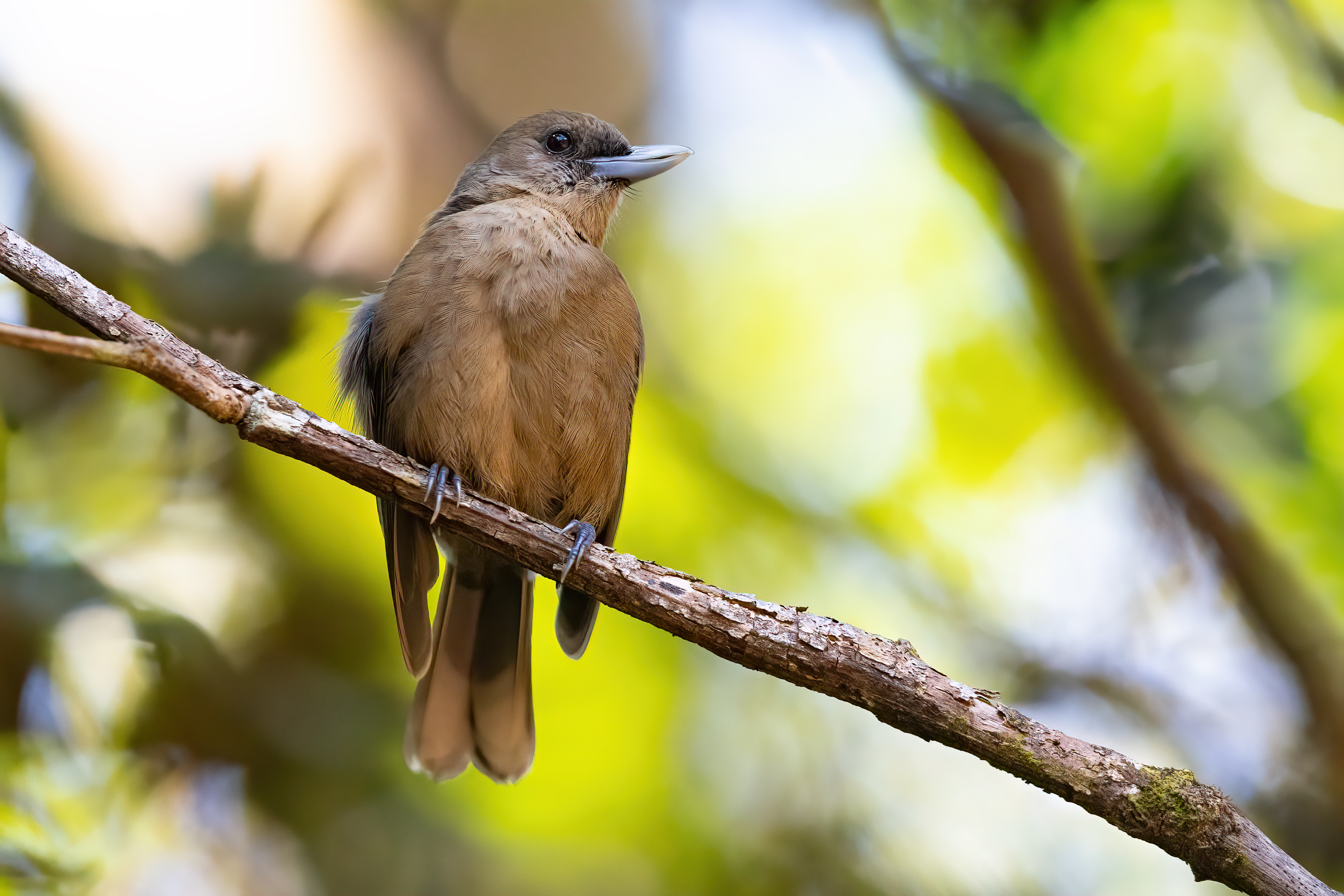

Conservation status
- Least Concern (IUCN 3.1)

Scientific classification
- Kingdom: Animalia
- Phylum: Chordata
- Class: Aves
- Order: Passeriformes
- Family: Monarchidae
- Genus: Clytorhynchus
- Species: C. pachycephaloides

Binomial name
- Clytorhynchus pachycephaloides Elliot, 1870

Subspecies
- See text

= Southern shrikebill =

Species of bird

The southern shrikebill (Clytorhynchus pachycephaloides), or brown flycatcher, is a songbird species in the family Monarchidae. It is found in New Caledonia and Vanuatu. Its natural habitat is subtropical or tropical moist lowland forests.

== Subspecies ==
Two subspecies are recognized:

- C. p. pachycephaloides - Elliot, 1870: Found on New Caledonia
- C. p. grisescens - Sharpe, 1899: Originally described as a separate species. Found on Banks Islands (Vanuatu)
