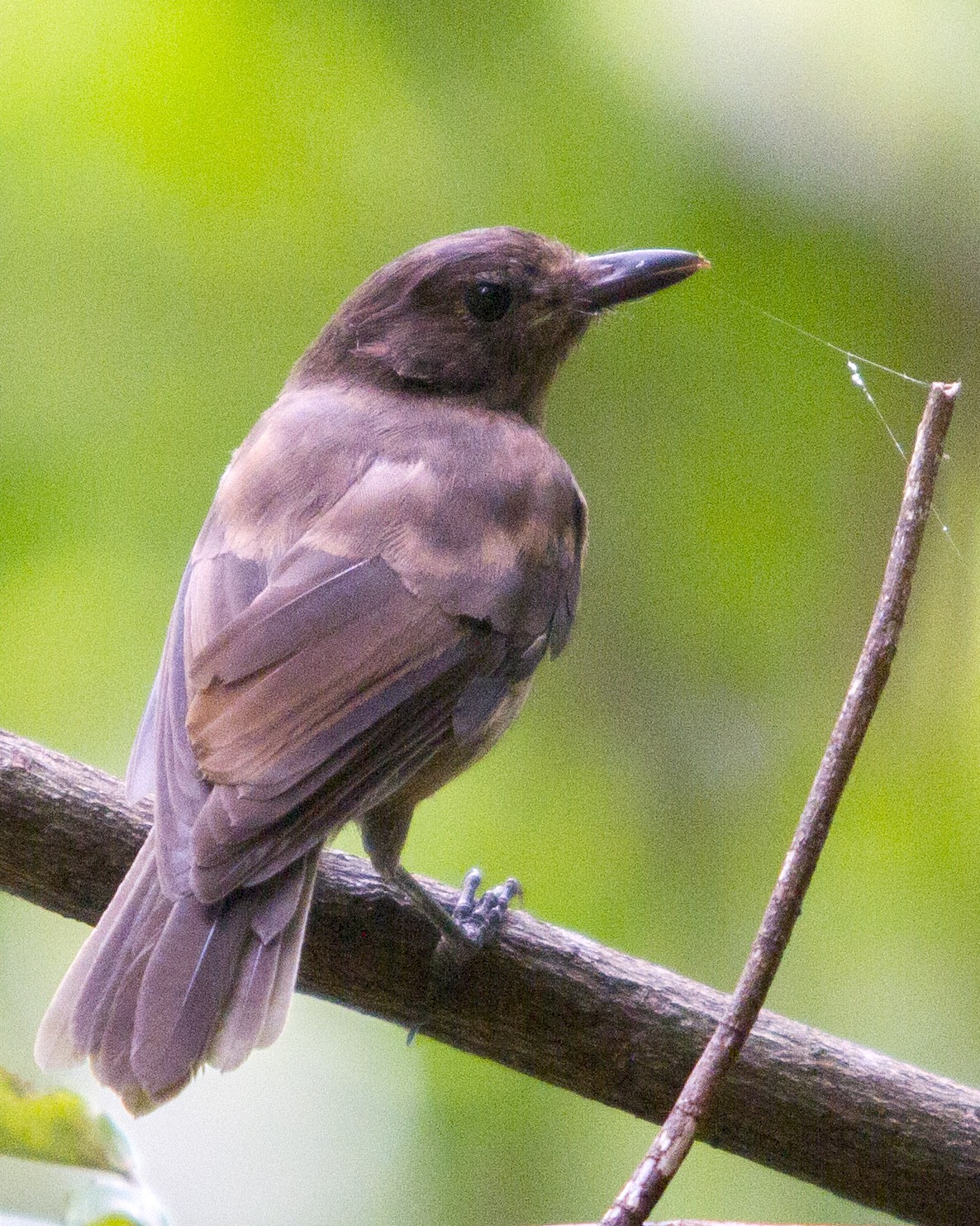
- in Palau.

Conservation status
- Least Concern (IUCN 3.1)

Scientific classification
- Kingdom: Animalia
- Phylum: Chordata
- Class: Aves
- Order: Passeriformes
- Family: Pachycephalidae
- Genus: Pachycephala
- Species: P. tenebrosa

Binomial name
- Pachycephala tenebrosa (Hartlaub & Finsch, 1868)

Synonyms
- Colluricincla tenebrosa; Malacolestes tenebrosa; Pitohui tenebrosus; Rectes tenebrosus

= Morningbird =

Species of bird

The morningbird (Pachycephala tenebrosa) is a songbird species in the family Pachycephalidae.

== Taxonomy and systematics ==
The morningbird was previously placed in the genus Colluricincla until 2013, when it was transferred to Pachycephala. (Note: The sooty shrikethrush, currently Colluricincla tenebrosa, was formerly known as Colluricincla umbrina (Reichenow, 1915) when the morningbird was in Colluricincla, as the name Rectes tenebrosus Hartlaub & Finsch, 1868 (the morningbird) has priority over Pachycephala tenebrosa Rothschild, 1911 (the sooty shrikethrush) when the two species are placed in the same genus; with the transfer of the morningbird from the genus Colluricincla to Pachycephala in 2013, the sooty shrikethrush reverted from umbrina to the older name tenebrosa.) Some authorities have placed the morningbird in the genus Pitohui and it is sometimes placed in its own monotypic genus, Malacolestes. Alternate names for the morningbird include the brown pitohui, morning pitohui, morning whistler, Palau morningbird and Palau pitohui.

== Distribution and habitat ==
The morningbird is endemic to the islands of Babeldaob, Koror, Ngercheu, Peleliu and Ngebad in Palau. Its natural habitat is deep primary tropical moist lowland forests. The species is non-migratory. It is apparently more common on the smaller islands in its range.

== Behaviour and ecology ==
Morningbirds feed principally on insects, but also take snails, berries, fruit and seeds. They feed on or around the ground.
