= Santa Cruz shrikebill =

Conservation status
- Endangered (IUCN 3.1)

Scientific classification
- Kingdom: Animalia
- Phylum: Chordata
- Class: Aves
- Order: Passeriformes
- Family: Monarchidae
- Genus: Clytorhynchus
- Species: C. sanctaecrucis

Binomial name
- Clytorhynchus sanctaecrucis Mayr, 1933

Synonyms
- Clytorhynchus nigrogularis sanctaecrucis

Species of bird

The Santa Cruz shrikebill (Clytorhynchus sanctaecrucis), or Nendo shrikebill, is a songbird species in the family Monarchidae. The Santa Cruz shrikebill was split from the black-throated shrikebill in 2008 but some authorities still consider it to be its subspecies, C. n. sanctaecrucis.

The Santa Cruz shrikebill is little-known species that has been very rarely sighted. It is endemic to the Solomon Islands. It is found on Nendo in the Santa Cruz Islands. Its natural habitats are subtropical or tropical moist lowland forests. It is threatened by habitat loss.
