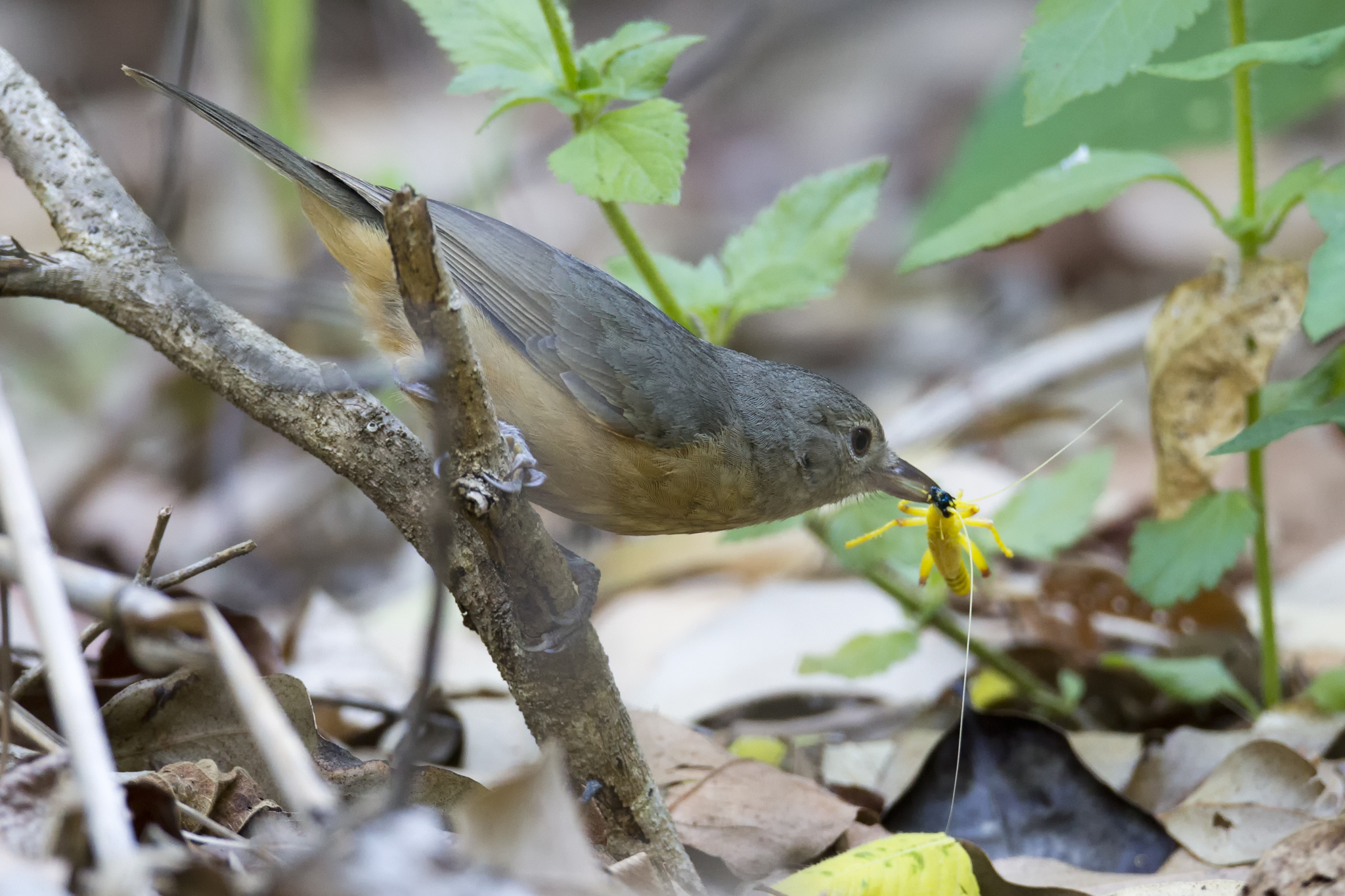

Conservation status
- Vulnerable (IUCN 3.1)

Scientific classification
- Kingdom: Animalia
- Phylum: Chordata
- Class: Aves
- Order: Passeriformes
- Family: Pachycephalidae
- Genus: Colluricincla
- Species: C. boweri

Binomial name
- Colluricincla boweri Ramsay, 1885
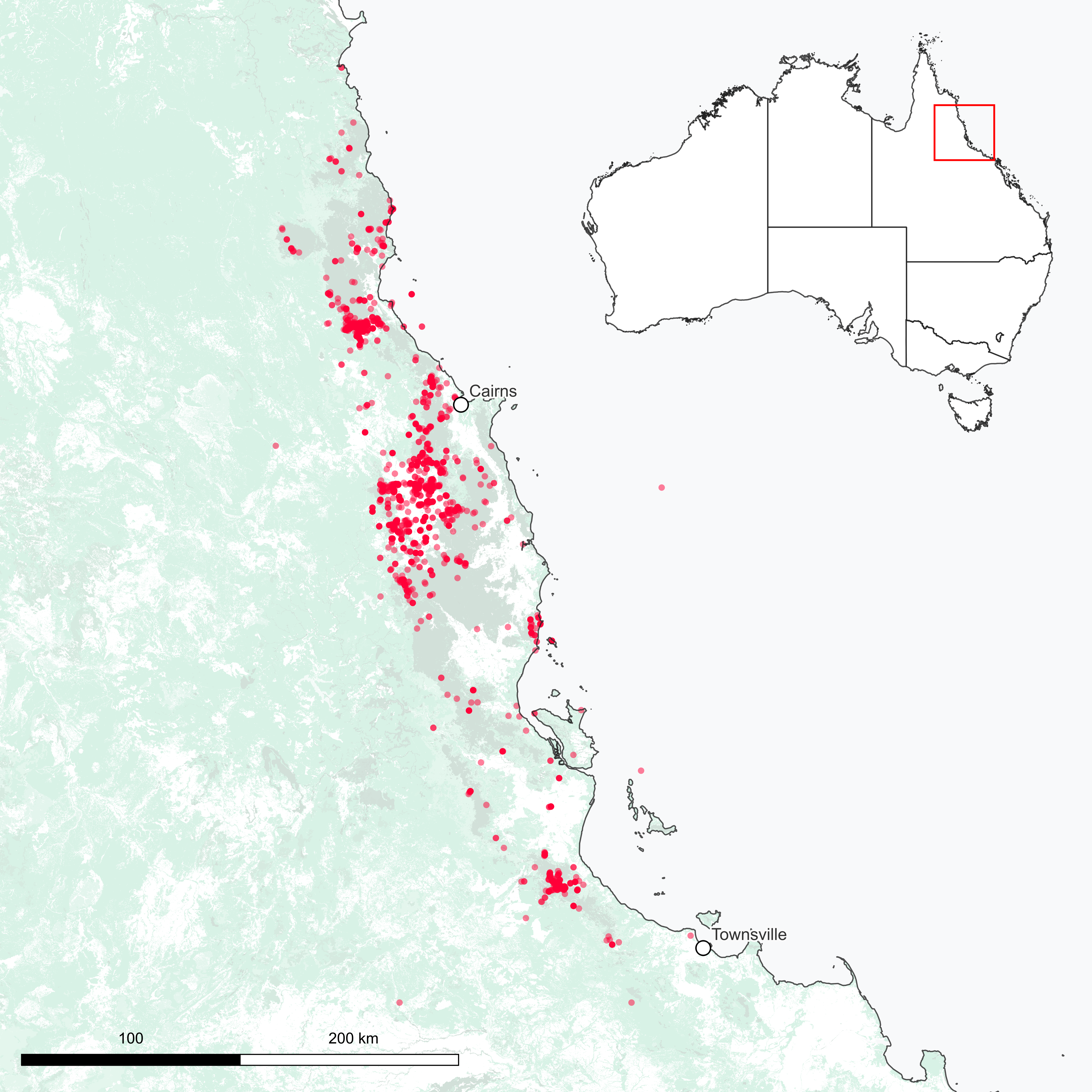
- Species distribution

Synonyms
- Collyriocincla boweri

= Bower's shrikethrush =

Species of bird

Bower's shrikethrush (Colluricincla boweri), also known as the stripe-breasted shrike-thrush, is a species of bird in the family Pachycephalidae. It is endemic to Australia. It is found on the southeast coast of Cape York Peninsula.

Its natural habitats are subtropical or tropical moist lowland forest and subtropical or tropical moist montane forest.

== Taxonomy and systematics ==
Bower's shrikethrush was originally described in 1885 by Edward Pierson Ramsay, curator of the Australian Museum in Sydney. The specific name boweri honors Thomas Henry Bowyer-Bower, curator of ornithology at the Western Australian Museum at the time. The genus name Colluricincla comes from the Greek kollurion ("a bird") and the Latin cinclus ("thrush").
