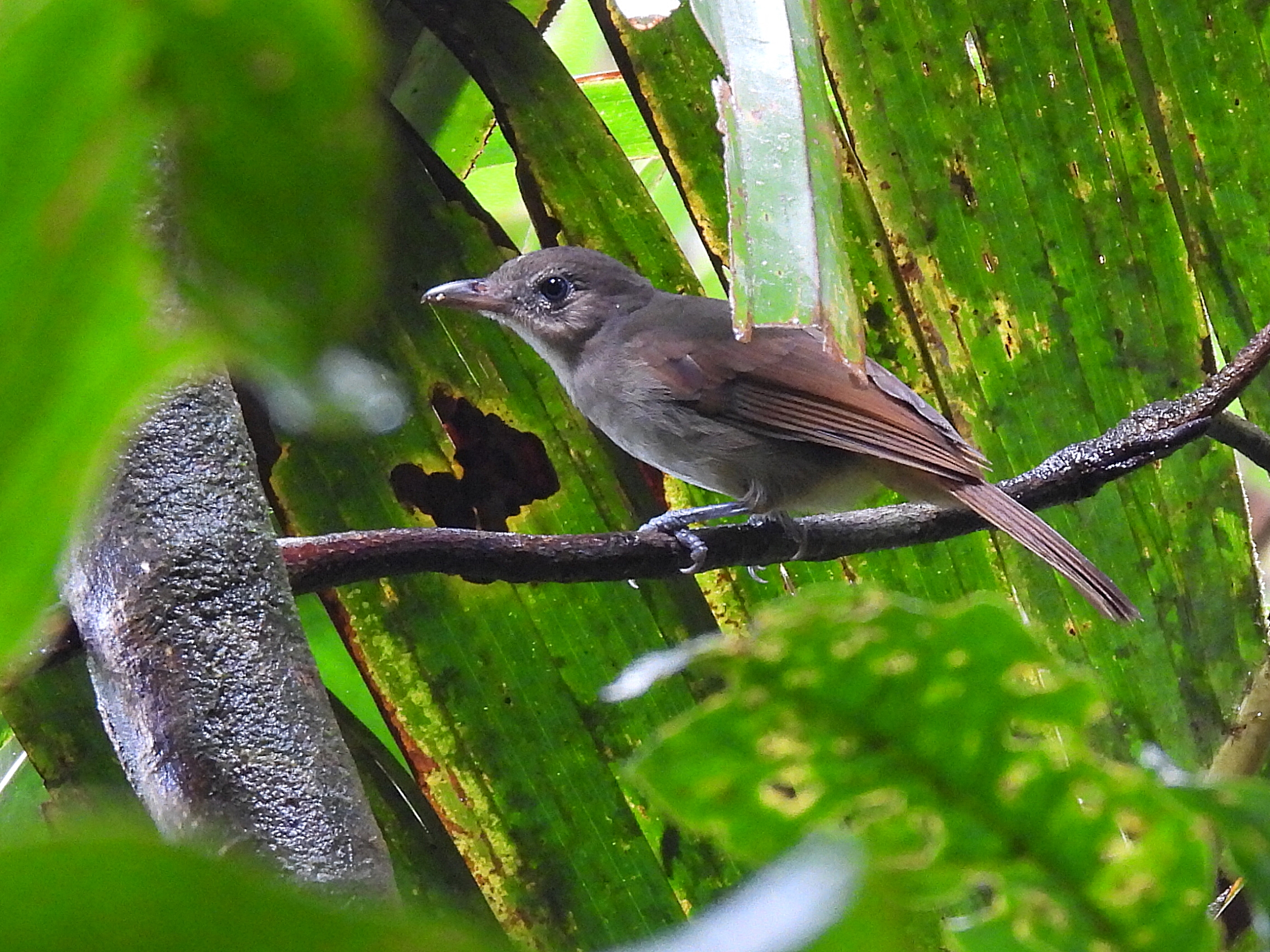

Conservation status
- Critically Endangered (IUCN 3.1)

Scientific classification
- Kingdom: Animalia
- Phylum: Chordata
- Class: Aves
- Order: Passeriformes
- Family: Pachycephalidae
- Genus: Coracornis
- Species: C. sanghirensis

Binomial name
- Coracornis sanghirensis (Oustalet, 1881)

Synonyms
- Colluricincla sanghirensis; Pinarolestes sanghirensis Oustalet, 1881

= Sangihe whistler =

Species of bird

The Sangihe whistler or Sangihe shrikethrush (Coracornis sanghirensis) is a species of bird in the family Pachycephalidae. It is endemic to Sangihe Island in Indonesia. Its natural habitat is subtropical or tropical moist montane forests. Specifically, it lives in ridgetop forests with large trees and full canopy cover.

It is threatened by habitat loss.

Originally, the Sangihe shrikethrush was described in the genus Pinarolestes. It was re-classified from the genus Colluricincla to Coracornis in 2013. Alternate names include the Sahengbalira shrike-thrush and Sangir whistler.
