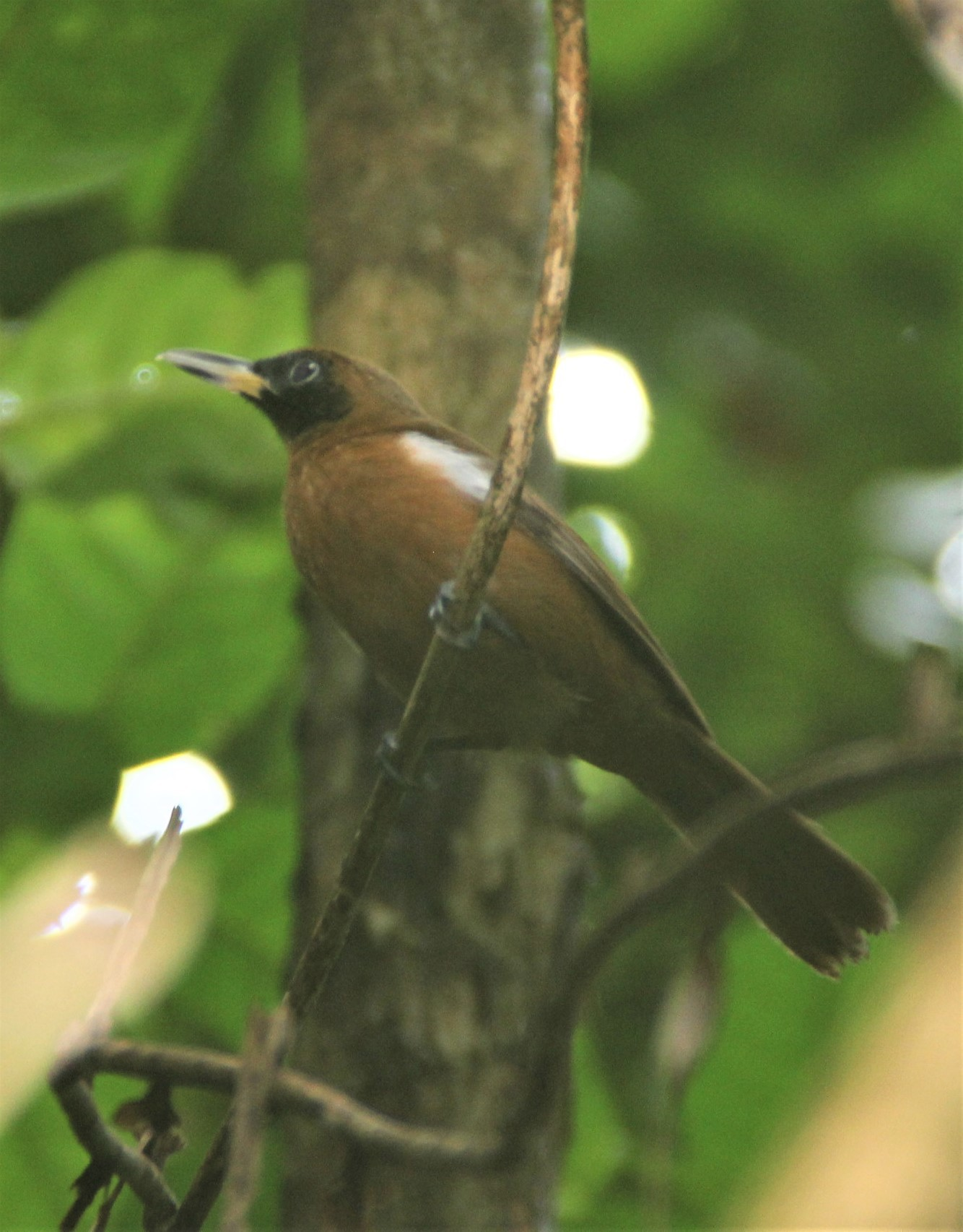

Conservation status
- Near Threatened (IUCN 3.1)

Scientific classification
- Kingdom: Animalia
- Phylum: Chordata
- Class: Aves
- Order: Passeriformes
- Family: Monarchidae
- Genus: Clytorhynchus
- Species: C. hamlini

Binomial name
- Clytorhynchus hamlini (Mayr, 1931)

Synonyms
- Pinarolestes hamlini

= Rennell shrikebill =

Species of bird

The Rennell shrikebill (Clytorhynchus hamlini) is a songbird species in the family Monarchidae. It is endemic to Rennell Island in the Solomon Islands. Its natural habitat is subtropical or tropical moist lowland forests.

The binomial commemorates Dr. Hannibal Hamlin, leader of the Whitney South Sea Expedition, who died in 1982.
