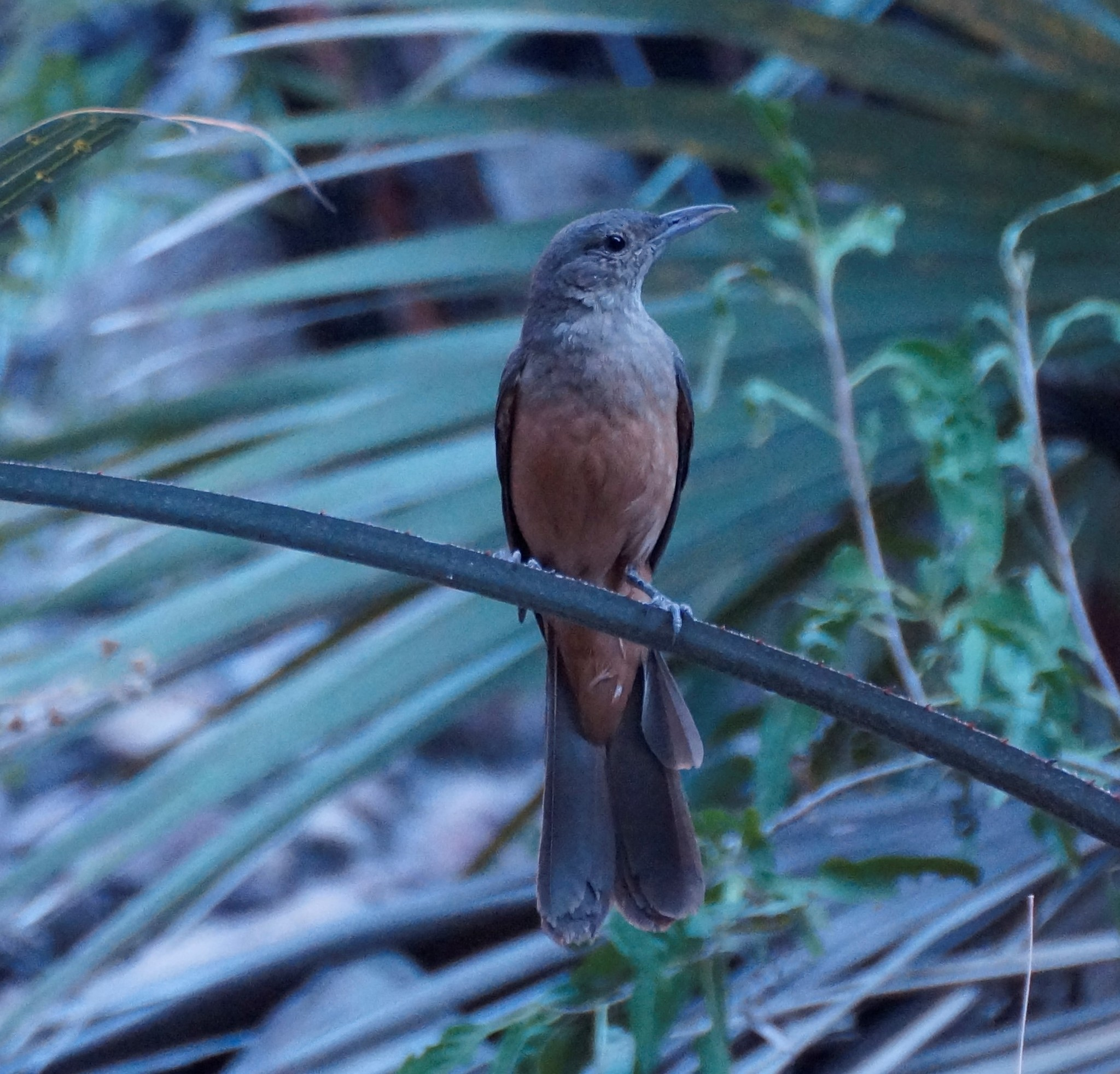

Conservation status
- Least Concern (IUCN 3.1)

Scientific classification
- Kingdom: Animalia
- Phylum: Chordata
- Class: Aves
- Order: Passeriformes
- Family: Pachycephalidae
- Genus: Colluricincla
- Species: C. woodwardi

Binomial name
- Colluricincla woodwardi Hartert, 1905

= Sandstone shrikethrush =

Species of bird

The sandstone shrikethrush (Colluricincla woodwardi) is a species of bird in the family Pachycephalidae. It is endemic to Australia. Alternate names for the sandstone shrikethrush include the brown-breasted shrike-thrush and sandstone thrush.
