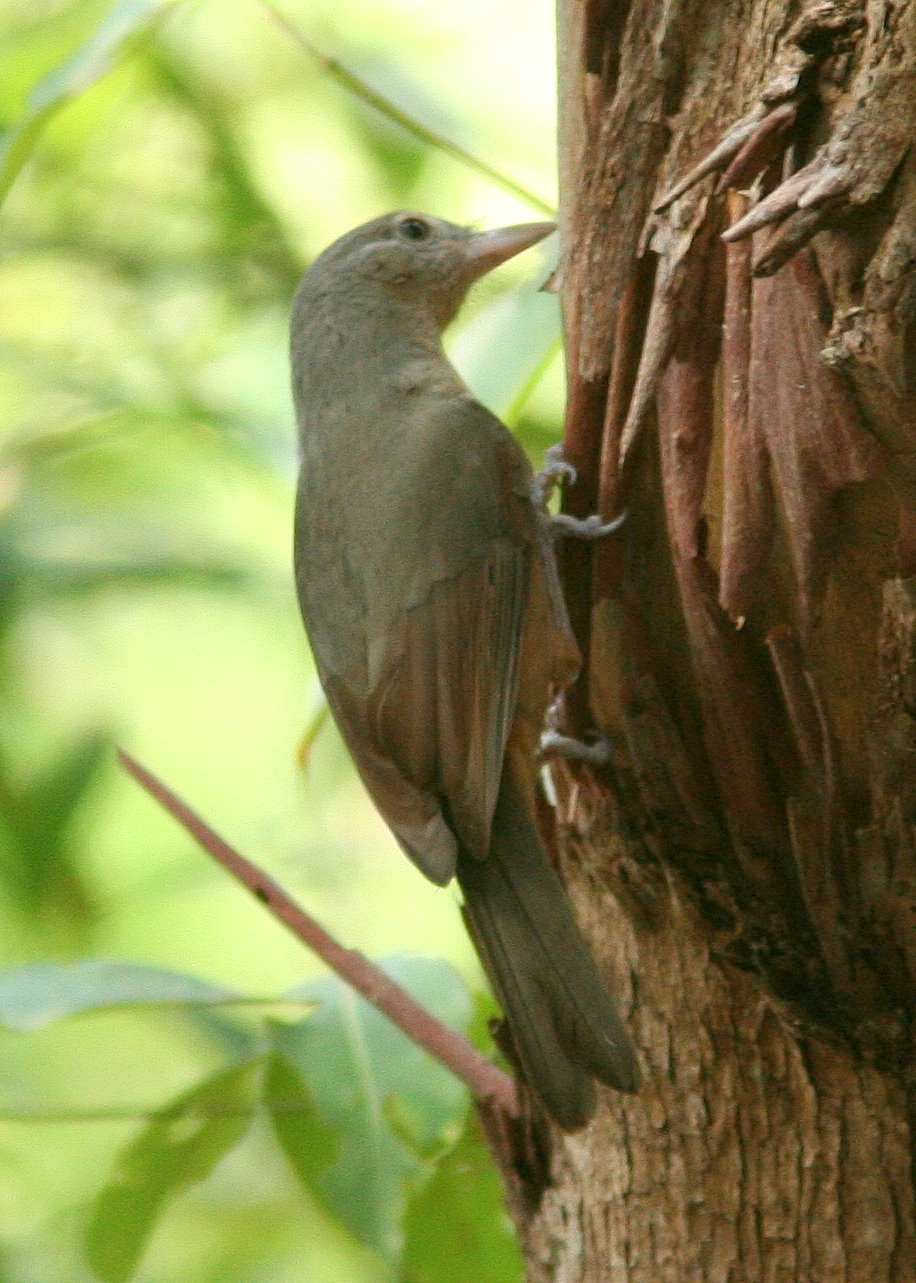

Conservation status
- Least Concern (IUCN 3.1)

Scientific classification
- Kingdom: Animalia
- Phylum: Chordata
- Class: Aves
- Order: Passeriformes
- Family: Pachycephalidae
- Genus: Colluricincla
- Species: C. megarhyncha

Binomial name
- Colluricincla megarhyncha (Quoy & Gaimard, 1832)

Synonyms
- Muscicapa megarhyncha; Myialestes megarhynchus; Myiolestes aruensis; Myiolestes megarhynchos; Pinarolestes megarhynchos; Pinarolestes megarhynchus

= Little shrikethrush =

Species of bird

The little shrikethrush or little shrike-thrush (Colluricincla megarhyncha) is a species of passerine bird in the family Pachycephalidae that is found in New Guinea as well as in north and east Australia.

== Taxonomy ==
The little shrikethrush was formally described and illustrated in 1832 as Muscicapa megarhyncha by the French naturalists Jean Quoy and Joseph Gaimard based on a specimen collected near Manokwari in the Bird's Head Peninsula of New Guinea. The specific epithet combines the Ancient Greek μεγα/mega meaning "much" with ῥυγχος/rhunkhos meaning "bill". The little shrikethrush is now placed in the genus Colluricincla that was introduced in 1827 by the naturalists Nicholas Vigors and Thomas Horsfield.

Molecular genetic studies of New Guinea populations of the little shrikethrush indicate high levels of genetic divergence, suggesting it may comprise more than one species. With at least eight separate clades identified as potential species splits, further research may lead to the re-classification of several new species. Alternate names for the little shrikethrush include the brown shrike-flycatcher and rufous shrike-thrush.

Sixteen subspecies are recognised:

- C. m. megarhyncha (Quoy, JRC & Gaimard, JP, 1832) – Salawati Island (west Papuan islands), Bird's Head Peninsula to head of Cenderawasih Bay and adjacent southwestern New Guinea plain
- C. m. parvula Gould, J, 1845 – northwestern Australia (Kimberley region, northern Western Australia, to Calvert River, eastern Northern Territory)
- C. m. aruensis (Gray, GR, 1858) – Aru Islands (New Guinea)
- C. m. fortis (Gadow, HF, 1883) – D'Entrecasteaux Archipelago (off southeastern New Guinea)
- C. m. trobriandi (Hartert, EJO, 1896) – Trobriand Islands (off southeastern New Guinea)
- C. m. despecta (Rothschild, LW & Hartert, EJO, 1903) – Papuan Peninsula, westward in the north to the Huon Gulf and in the south to the upper Fly-Digul Rivers
- C. m. affinis (Gray, GR, 1862) – Waigeo (Raja Ampat Islands, off western New Guinea)
- C. m. obscura (Meyer, AB, 1874) – Yapen (Cenderawasih Bay, off northwestern New Guinea)
- C. m. hybridus (Meise, W, 1929) – northwestern and west-central New Guinea
- C. m. discolor De Vis, CW, 1890 – Tagula Island (Louisiade Archipelago, off southeastern New Guinea)
- C. m. tappenbecki Reichenow, A, 1899 – northeastern New Guinea (Astrolabe Bay to lower Sepik River)
- C. m. madaraszi (Rothschild, LW & Hartert, EJO, 1903) – northeastern New Guinea (Huon Peninsula)
- C. m. maeandrina (Stresemann, EFT, 1921) – northeastern New Guinea (upper Sepik River and Victor Emanuel Mountains)
- C. m. rufogaster Gould, J, 1845 – eastern Australia (Bowen, northeastern Queensland, southward to Port Macquarie, central New South Wales)
- C. m. normani (Mathews, GM, 1914) – southern New Guinea and northeastern Australia (western Torres Strait islands, northern Queensland from Nicholson River eastward to Normanby River catchment, Cape York Peninsula, northern Queensland)
- C. m. griseata (Gray, GR, 1858) – northeastern Australia (Starke to Cape Bowling Green, northeastern Queensland)

The name Arafura shrikethrush was proposed in 2018 for the subspecies megarhyncha, batantae and parvula.

== Distribution and habitat ==
It is found in Australia and New Guinea. Its natural habitats are subtropical or tropical moist lowland forests and subtropical or tropical moist montane forests.

== Behaviour and ecology ==
During a study of toxicity in birds, two specimens of this species were tested. One of these specimens contained traces of batrachotoxins (BTXs) similar to those found in the secretions of Central and South American poison dart frogs.
