= Maroon-backed whistler =

Conservation status
- Least Concern (IUCN 3.1)

Scientific classification
- Kingdom: Animalia
- Phylum: Chordata
- Class: Aves
- Order: Passeriformes
- Family: Pachycephalidae
- Genus: Coracornis
- Species: C. raveni

Binomial name
- Coracornis raveni Riley, 1918

Synonyms
- Pachycephala raveni

Species of bird

The maroon-backed whistler (Coracornis raveni) is a species of bird in the family Pachycephalidae. It is endemic to Sulawesi, Indonesia. Its natural habitat is subtropical or tropical moist montane forests. Some authorities have classified the maroon-backed whistler in the genus Pachycephala. Alternate names include the Rano Rano whistler and Raven's whistler.
