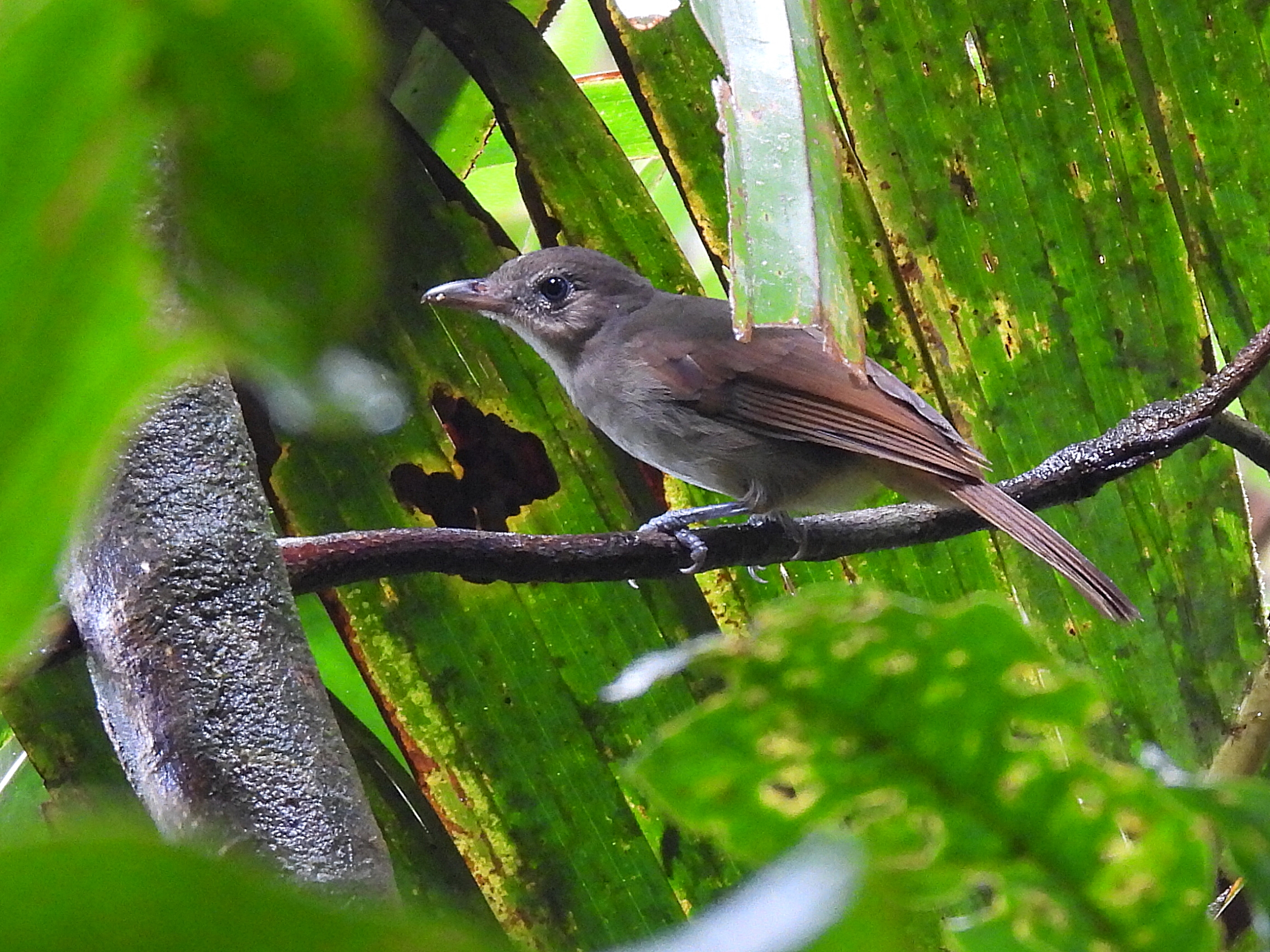
- Coracornis sanghirensis

Scientific classification
- Kingdom: Animalia
- Phylum: Chordata
- Class: Aves
- Order: Passeriformes
- Family: Pachycephalidae
- Subfamily: Pachycephalinae
- Genus: Coracornis; Riley, 1918

Type species
- Coracornis raveni Riley, 1918

= Coracornis =

Genus of birds

Coracornis is a genus of birds in the family Pachycephalidae. The two species are found in Indonesia.

== Taxonomy and systematics ==
Formerly, the genus Coracornis was considered to be monotypic, containing only the maroon-backed whistler. The Sangihe shrikethrush was added in 2013 following recent genetic studies.

=== Species ===
Two species are recognized:

- Maroon-backed whistler (Coracornis raveni)
- Sangihe whistler (Coracornis sanghirensis)
